= List of first class roads in Slovakia =

The list of Class I roads in Slovakia contains an overview of all communications that are categorized as Class I roads.

Route name	sign	Route	Length [km]
I/2	I2-SVK-2020	Holíč – Malacky – Bratislava – Hungarian border at Rusovce	102
I/9	I9-SVK-2020	Czech border at Drietoma – Trenčín – Prievidza – Žiar nad Hronom; Former portion of I/50	114
I/10	I10-SVK-2020	Czech border at Bumbálka – Bytča	30
I/11	I11-SVK-2020	Czech border at Svrčinovec – Čadca – Žilina	37
I/11A	I11A-SVK-2020	Čadca bypass To become the D3 in 2029	5
I/11b	I11b-SVK-2020	Čadca	1
I/12	I12-SVK-2020	Svrčinovec – Polish border at Skalité	15
I/13	I13-SVK-2020	Veľký Meder – Hungarian border at Medveďov	12
I/14	I14-SVK-2020	Banská Bystrica – Turčianske Teplice	22
I/15	I15-SVK-2020	Vranov nad Topľou – Stropkov	49
I/16	I16-SVK-2020	Zvolen – Lučenec – Rožňava – Košice; Former portion of I/50	197
I/17	I17-SVK-2020	Hungarian border at Milhosť – Košice; Former portion of I/68	18
I/18	I18-SVK-2020	Žilina – Vrútky – Ružomberok – Poprad – Prešov – Vranov nad Topľou – Michalovce; Originally began at Bumbálka, but this section became the new I/10, a portion of the current I/61 and the new I/60 in 2015.	304
I/19	I19-SVK-2020	Košice – Michalovce – Ukrainian border at Vyšné Nemecké; Former portion of I/50	90
I/20	I20-SVK-2020	Košice – Prešov; Former portion of I/68	24
I/21	I21-SVK-2020	Lipníky – Svidník – Polish border at Vyšný Komárnik	59
I/35	I35-SVK-2020	Galanta – Sereď	8
I/49	I49-SVK-2020	Czech border at Lysá pod Makytou – Púchov – Beluša	27
I/49A	I49A-SVK-2020	Dolné Kočkovce – Púchov; Portion of R6 expressway	5
I/50	I50-SVK-2020	Czech border at Drietoma – Ukrainian border at Vyšné Nemecké; Decommissioned on 1 August 2015. The Drietoma–Ladomerská Vieska section became the new I/9, the Ladomerská Vieska–Šášovské Podhradie section became a portion of current I/65, the Zvolen–Košice section became the new I/16, and the Košice–Vyšné Nemecké section became the new I/19.	403
I/51	I51-SVK-2020	Czech border at Holíč – Trnava; Nitra – Hontianske Nemce – Banská Štiavnica – Hronská Breznica	200
I/54	I54-SVK-2020	Czech border at Moravské Lieskové – Nové Mesto nad Váhom	16
I/57	I57-SVK-2020	Czech border at Horné Srnie – Dubnica nad Váhom	12
I/59	I59-SVK-2020	Banská Bystrica – Ružomberok – Dolný Kubín – Polish border at Trstená	114
I/60	I60-SVK-2020	Žilina ring road	6.5
I/61	I61-SVK-2020	Austrian border west of Bratislava – Bratislava – Senec – Trnava – Piešťany – Nové Mesto nad Váhom – Trenčín – Považská Bystrica – Žilina	191
I/61A	I61A-SVK-2020	Beluša	2
I/62	I62-SVK-2020	Senec – Sereď – Šoporňa	37
I/63	I63-SVK-2020	Bratislava – Dunajská Streda – Komárno – Štúrovo – Hungarian border	148
I/64	I64-SVK-2020	Hungarian border – Komárno – Nové Zámky – Nitra – Prievidza – Žilina	213
I/64A	I64A-SVK-2020	Rajeckých Teplíc bypass	1
I/64b	I64b-SVK-2020	Bytčica	
I/64C	I64C-SVK-2020	Road I/64 – Road I/64b	
I/64d	I64d-SVK-2020	Topoľčiani – Krušovice	
I/65	I65-SVK-2020	Nitra – Zlaté Moravce – Čaradice; Hronský Beňadik – Nová Baňa; Žarnovica – Žiar nad Hronom – Turčianske Teplice – Martin – Vrútky	125
I/65D	I65D-SVK-2020	Martin bypass	7
I/66	I66-SVK-2020	Hungarian border at Šahy – Zvolen – Banská Bystrica – Brezno – Vernár – Poprad – Spišská Belá – Polish border at Tatranská Javorina	244
I/66A	I66A-SVK-2020	Poprad bypass	3.64
I/67	I67-SVK-2020	Hungarian border at Kráľ – Tornaľa; Rožňava – Pusté Pole; Originally continued to Tatranská Javorina, but this (along with I/67A) became a portion of I/66 in 2015.	61
I/68	I68-SVK-2020	Polish border at Mníšek nad Popradom – Stará Ľubovňa – Prešov; Originally continued to the Hungarian border at Milhosť, but this section was split off to the new I/17 and I/20 in 2015.	80
I/69	I69-SVK-2020	Kováčová – Banská Bystrica; Decommissioned on 1 January 2025 and absorbed into I/66.	13
I/70	I70-SVK-2020	Párnica – Dolný Kubín	18
I/71	I71-SVK-2020	Lučenec – Hungarian border at Šiatorská Bukovinka	26
I/72	I72-SVK-2020	Rimavská Sobota – Brezno; Podbrezová – Liptovský Hrádok	105
I/73	I73-SVK-2020	Lipníky – Svidník – Polish border at Vyšný Komárnik; Decommissioned on 1 August 2015 and renumbered to I/21.	59
I/74	I74-SVK-2020	Strážske – Humenné – Ukrainian border at Ubľa	60
I/74A	I74A-SVK-2020	Humenné inner bypass	3
I/74B	I74B-SVK-2020	Humenné inner bypass	0.1
I/75	I75-SVK-2020	Sládkovičovo – Galanta – Šaľa – Nové Zámky – Veľký Krtíš – Lučenec	200
I/75A	I75A-SVK-2020	Galanta bypass	9
I/76	I76-SVK-2020	Štúrovo – Hronský Beňadik	75
I/77	I77-SVK-2020	Spišská Belá – Stará Ľubovňa – Bardejov – Svidník	115
I/77A	I77A-SVK-2020	Čirč – Polish border	0.1
I/78	I78-SVK-2020	Oravský Podzámok – Námestovo – Polish border at Oravská Polhora	44
I/79	I79-SVK-2020	Vranov nad Topľou – Trebišov – Slovenské Nové Mesto – Čierna	90
I/79A	I79A-SVK-2020	Slovenské Nové Mesto – Hungarian border	0.4
I/80	I80-SVK-2020	I/68 in Presov – D1 motorway in Presov; Decommissioned on 1 October 2020 and absorbed into I/68.	1.8

== See also ==
- Highways in Slovakia
- Transport in Slovakia
- Controlled-access highway
- Limited-access road
