= Erling Broch =

Norwegian judge

- Born: 28 February 1875; Horten, Norway
- Died: 4 September 1941 (aged 66)
- Occupation: Judge
- Children: Lisbeth Broch
- Relatives: Hjalmar Broch (brother); Olaf Broch (brother); Nanna Broch (sister); Lagertha Broch (sister); Vilhelm Evang (son-in-law)

Erling Broch (22 February 1875 – 4 September 1941) was a Norwegian judge.

He was born in Horten to brewery owner Johan Anthony Zincke Broch and Fanny Caroline Harriet Gamborg. He was a brother of Hjalmar Broch, Olaf Broch, Lagertha Broch and Nanna Broch, father of Lisbeth Broch, and father-in-law of Vilhelm Evang.

He graduated as cand.jur. in 1899, and was named as a Supreme Court Justice from 1924.
