= Slovakia–Ukraine border =

International border

Slovak and Ukrainian boundary markers

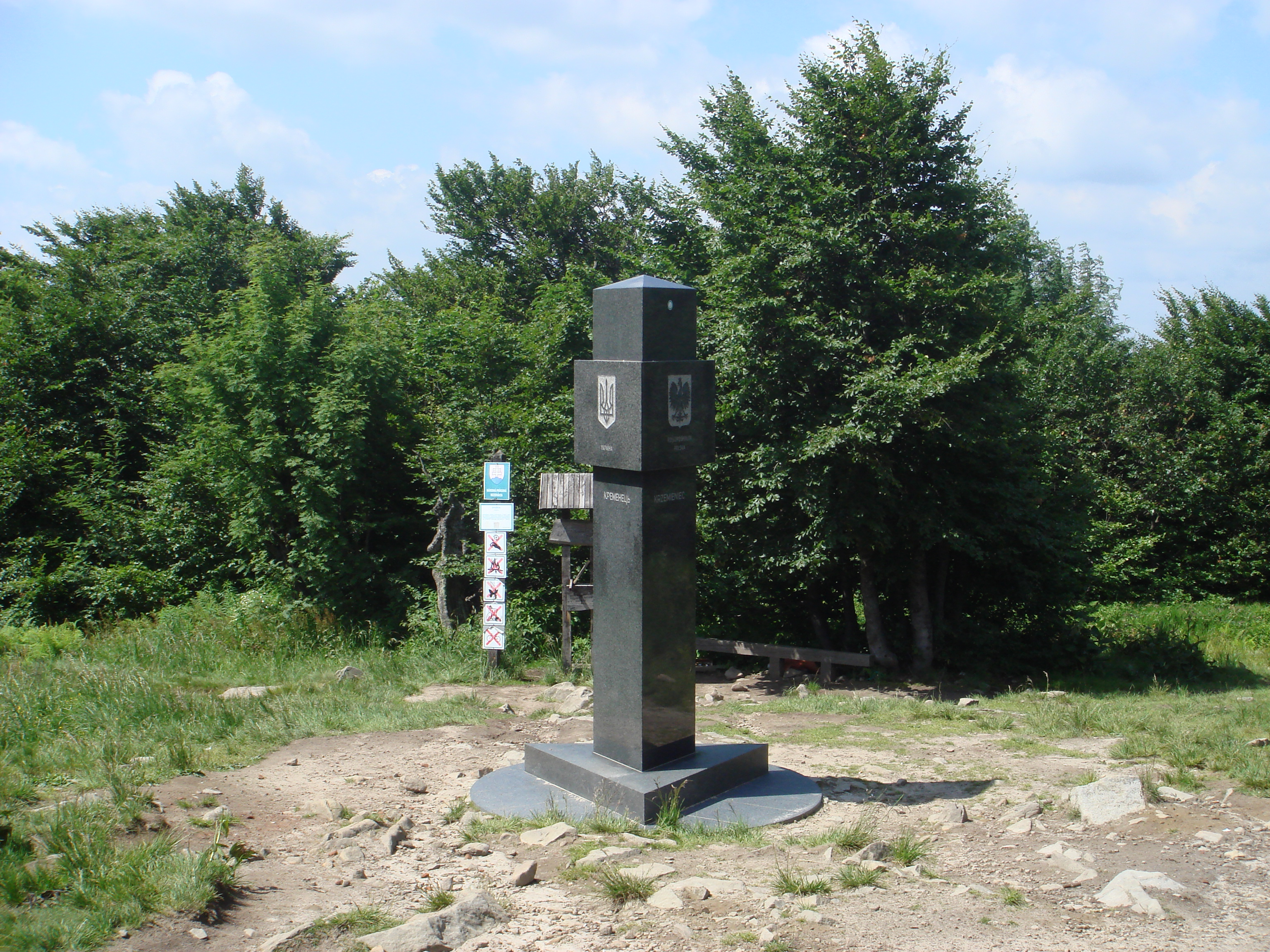
Slovak, Polish and Ukrainian border tripoint

The Slovakia–Ukraine border is an internationally established boundary between Slovakia and Ukraine. Both countries inherited it from their previous respective state organizations, Ukraine from the Soviet Union and Slovakia from Czechoslovakia.

The current border was established after World War II and stretches for 97 km (60 mi). After the admission of Slovakia to the European Union, the border became part of the external border of the European Union. Ukraine's Uzhhorod Airport is located at the border.

== Border checkpoints ==
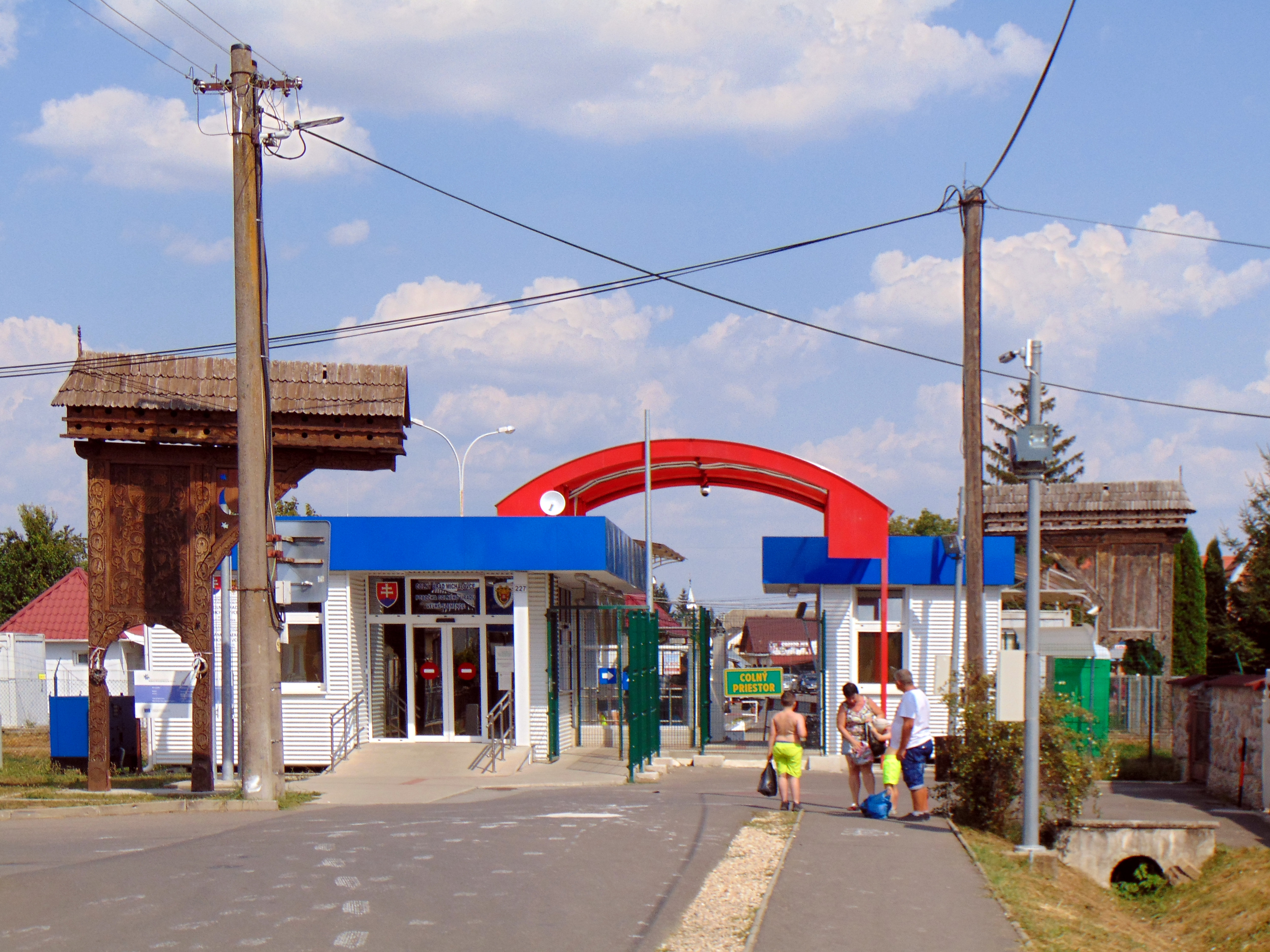
Slovak-Ukrainian border, crossing-point Veľké Slemence - Mali Selmentsi; Slovak side.

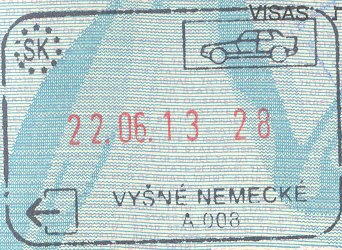
Exit passport stamp issued at the border crossing point in Vyšné Nemecké.

Border checkpoints are the following:

Road

Uzhhorod	(Ukraine)	M08 E50 I/50	(Slovakia)	Vyšné Nemecké	motorized traffic only, no pedestrians and cyclists allowed	48.655749°N 22.265296°E
Malyi Bereznyi	(Ukraine)	P53/74	(Slovakia)	Ubľa	only for vehicles with maximal permissible weight up to 3.5 tons	48.883937°N 22.420478°E

Rail

Pavlove (Pallo)	(Ukraine)	—	(Slovakia)	Maťovce	freight only
Chop	(Ukraine)	—	(Slovakia)	Čierna nad Tisou

Others

Mali Selmentsi	(Ukraine)	—	(Slovakia)	Veľké Slemence	only for pedestrians and cyclists	48.511125°N 22.154290°E

In 2008 the border was crossed by some 2.8 million people and over 1.5 million transportation objects.

== See also ==
- State Border of Ukraine
- Slovakia–Ukraine relations
