= Lisbeth Broch =

Norwegian historian, school principal and politician

- Born: Elisabeth Broch; 1 May 1911; Trondheim, Norway
- Died: 21 August 1991 (aged 80)
- Occupations: historian, school principal and politician
- Spouse: Vilhelm Evang
- Parent: Erling Broch

Elisabeth Broch (1 May 1911 – 21 August 1991) was a Norwegian historian, school principal and politician for the Labour Party.

== Personal life and education ==
She was born in Trondheim as a daughter of Supreme Court Justice Erling Broch (1875–1941) and Anna Cecilie Munch-Petersen (1877–1957). She was a niece of children's writer Lagertha Broch, professor Olaf Broch, social worker Nanna Broch and professor Hjalmar Broch. She grew up in Vestre Aker and finished her secondary education in 1930 at Ris Upper Secondary School.

She graduated from the Royal Frederick University with the cand.philol. in history in 1937, and in the next year she finished the teachers' education. She chaired Filologisk Forening and was a board member of the Norwegian Students' Society. As a student she was a member of Mot Dag, and contributed to the encyclopedia Arbeidernes Leksikon.

She married fellow Mot Dag member and later military officer Vilhelm Evang in 1938. They resided in Bærum.

== Career ==
After graduation in 1938 she worked at various upper secondary schools. In 1942 she was also hired as part-time history lecturer at the University of Oslo. In 1951 she had her first spell at Valler Upper Secondary School, and after a spell at Aars og Voss from 1952 to 1960 she served as principal of Valler from 1960 until her retirement in 1979.

Among her publications are Kvinnereising from 1940, The Political Role of Women in Norway from 1952, and volume 3 of Aschehougs verdenshistorie from 1954.

She was a member of Bærum municipal council from 1948 to 1955 and 1960 to 1967. She was a member of the executive committee for the last three years, a school board member and also a board member of Bærum Labour Party from 1950 to 1951. She was a board member of Norsk Lektorlag from 1959 to 1962. She died in August 1991.
