= Malyi Bereznyi (border control) =

Border crossing between Ukraine and Slovakia

Malyi Bereznyi Port of Entry

Location
- Country: Ukraine
- Location: Malyi Bereznyi
- Coordinates: 48.883937°N 22.420478°E

Malyi Bereznyi Port of Entry is a land border crossing between Ukraine and Slovakia on the Ukrainian side, near the village of Malyi Bereznyi, Velykyi Bereznyi Raion. The crossing is situated on autoroute I/74 - P53. Across the border on the Slovak side is the village of Ubľa. The Slovak border crossing simultaneously serves as a crossing with the European Union (Schengen Area).

The type of crossing is automobile, status - international. The types of transportation for automobile crossings are passenger and freight.

The port of entry is part of the Uzhhorod customs post of Chop customs.

== See also ==
- Slovakia–Ukraine border
- State Border of Ukraine
- Uzhhorod (border checkpoint)
