= Evang =

Evang is a Norwegian surname. Notable people with the surname include:

- Karl Evang (1902–1981), Norwegian physician and civil servant
- Vilhelm Evang (1909–1983), Norwegian military officer

== See also ==
- Evans (surname)
