= Ernst Selmer =

Ernst Selmer may refer to:

- Ernst Sejersted Selmer (1920–2006), Norwegian mathematician
- Ernst W. Selmer (1890–1971), Norwegian philologist and phonetician
