= Norwegian Intelligence Service =

National intelligence agency of Norway

Norwegian Intelligence Service (NIS)
- Etterretningstjenesten

Intelligence agency overview
- Formed: 1915
- Jurisdiction: Government of Norway
- Headquarters: Lutvann, Oslo
- Motto: Viten om verden for vern av Norge (Knowledge of the World for the Protection of Norway)
- Employees: Classified
- Annual budget: kr 2.3 billion
- Minister responsible: Bjørn Arild Gram Centre Party, Defence
- Intelligence agency executive: Vice Admiral Nils Andreas Stensønes
- Parent Intelligence agency: Ministry of Defence
- Website: Official Website

The Norwegian Intelligence Service (NIS) or Etterretningstjenesten (lit. 'The Intelligence Service'; E-tjenesten) is a Norwegian military intelligence agency under the Chief of Defence and the Ministry of Defence.

== History ==
Olav Njølstad says that the "stay-behind cooperation with the US and Great Britain represented a milestone in the Norwegian intelligence services' history". Furthermore, through the stay-behind arrangement, the CIA finally conquered their mistrust of the Norwegian intelligence services. An important turning point" was the October–November 1949 secret visit to Norway by Frank Wisner and Richard Helms. The purpose of the visit was to discuss stay-behind with those with the top responsibility on the Norway's side. In 1995, the Ministry of Defence confirmed that the intelligence service had operated a stay-behind service in cooperation with the CIA and MI6 since the end of World War II.

The two ravens on the coat of arms represent Huginn and Muninn ("Thought" and "Mind"), the two ravens that bring information to the Norse god Odin. The red flower is thought to be either an Olaf's Rose or a sub rosa reference, perhaps both. The Olaf rose is a national symbol of Norway and sub rosa is a Latin term referring to confidentiality and secrecy.

=== 2013 inspections ===
On 12 August 2013 the first ever unannounced inspection by Parliament's Intelligence Oversight Committee, was performed at the NIS headquarters at Lutvann in Oslo. This inspection came to be as a result of "a complaint from one or more persons" "who felt they were under surveillance".

On 27 August 2013, the Parliament's Intelligence Oversight Committee (the EOS Committee) made an unannounced inspection of the Intelligence Service's facilities at Havnelageret in Oslo. On 29 August 2013 Dagbladet said that according to their sources the Intelligence Service had stored personal information about more than 400 Norwegians—including diplomats and bureaucrats—who either were sources for the intelligence service or people the service wanted to recruit as future sources.

The inspection at Havnelageret was followed up by an announced inspection on 4 September 2013.

== Organization ==
The service has operated, or still operates, the following stations, all of them located north of the Arctic Circle:

- Andøya (Nordland county): former SOSUS station, suspected ACINT station, connected to the No. 333 Squadron RNoAF
- Fauske (Nordland county): suspected FISINT (TELINT) and ELINT station
- Kirkenes (Finnmark county): suspected ELINT and NUCINT station
- Ringerike (Buskerud county): SATINT, established 2000
- Vardø (Finnmark county): the GLOBUS radar, suspected ELINT station, active since the 1950s
- Vadsø (Finnmark county): SIGINT (COMINT) station, active since 1951

Kirkenes, Vardø, and Vadsø are close to the Russian border near Severomorsk in the Murmansk district on the Kola Peninsula, the home of the former Soviet Northern Fleet and now its Russian equivalent.

The agency uses two ELINT ships: FS Marjata and FS Eger.

The Norwegian Military Geographic Service, Forsvarets militærgeografiske tjeneste is a subordinate unit to the head of the NIS.

== E 14 ==
E 14 (Norway) (Seksjon for spesiell innhenting) is/was a highly classified section within the Intelligence Service, focusing on covert missions abroad. For a period, the section was led by Ola Kaldager. Agents include the late Trond André Bolle.

== Leaders ==
- Vice Admiral Nils Andreas Stensønes (3 November 2020–Present)
- General Morten Haga Lunde (2016–2020)
- General Kjell Grandhagen (2010–2015)
- Colonel Johan Berg (1966–?)
- Vilhelm Evang (1946–1965)

== See also ==
- F/S Marjata
- Military of Norway
