= Johan Berg =

Norwegian military officer

- Born: 12 May 1917; Stange, Norway
- Died: September 1981 (aged 64)
- Occupations: Army officer Journal editor
- Awards: Order of the Dannebrog; Defence Medal 1940–1945; Haakon VII 70th Anniversary Medal

Johan Berg (12 May 1917 – September 1981) was a Norwegian military officer.

== Career ==
Berg was born in Stange Municipality to Sigvart Berg and Borghild Evenrud. He graduated as military officer in 1939. From 1939 to 1940 he served as lieutenant with the 6th Division, and from 1940 to 1945 with the Norwegian Armed Forces in exile in the United Kingdom. He continued his military career after the Second World War.

In 1966 he succeeded Vilhelm Evang as head of the Norwegian Intelligence Service. From 1970 he served as head of Distriktskommando Vestlandet with the rank of major general. He edited the journal Norsk Militært Tidsskrift from 1957 to 1966. Berg died after a long illness in September 1981, 64 years old.

== Awards ==
Berg was decorated Knight of the Danish Order of the Dannebrog. He was awarded the Norwegian Defence Medal 1940–1945 and Haakon VII 70th Anniversary Medal.
