= Road I/50 (Slovakia) =

Former first-class road in Slovakia

First-class Road 50

Route information
- Length: 403.8 km (250.9 mi)
- History: Split into roads I/9, I/65, I/16, and I/19

Major junctions
- West end: Czech border near Drietoma; 48°57′6.25″N 17°53′48.98″E
- East end: Ukrainian border near Vyšné Nemecké; 48°39′25.73″N 22°15′51.6″E

Location
- Country: Slovakia

Highway system
- Highways in Slovakia

Road I/50 was a first-class road in Slovakia. It was the longest numbered road in Slovakia, with a total length of 403.8 km and it crossed the country from the northwest to the east. Sections of the road were parts of European routes E50, E58, E71, E77, E571 and E572. Expressway R2 is planned to be constructed along most of the route to relieve the rising traffic. Most of the road has two lanes. A section of about 20 km between Žiar nad Hronom and Zvolen has four lanes and an emergency lane in each direction, and the section between Nováky and Prievidza also has four lanes, as does a section of about 17 km before Košice. The road crossed the Trenčín, Banská Bystrica and Košice Regions.

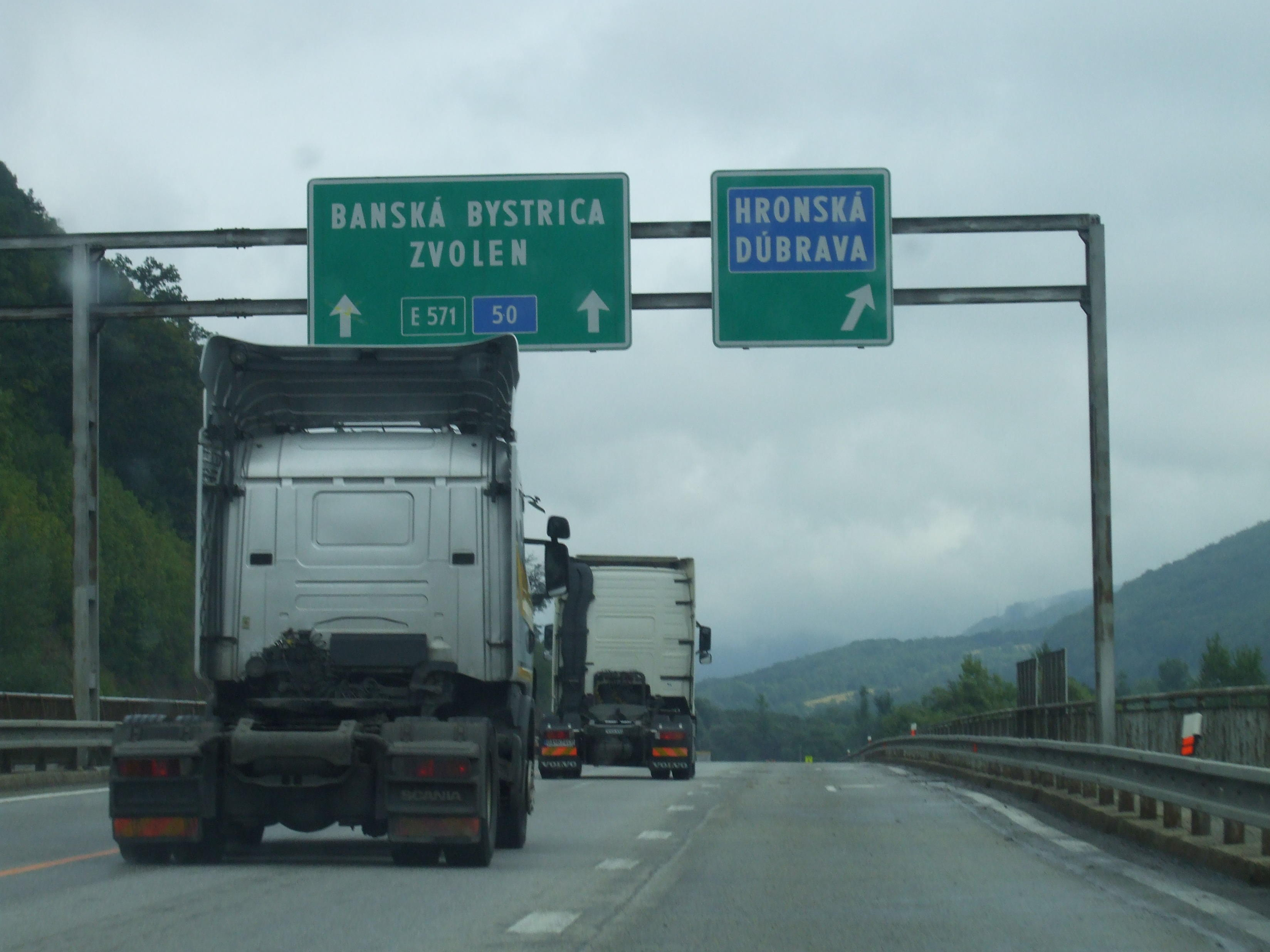
The R1 sharing its route with I/50

On 1 August 2015, several roads were renumbered in Slovakia, including the I/50. The I/50 was split into roads I/9 (Drietoma–Ladomerská Vieska), I/65 (Ladomerská Vieska–Šášovské Podhradie), I/16 (Zvolen–Košice) and I/19 (Košice–Vyšné Nemecké). The R1 between Žiar nad Hronom and Zvolen was shared with the I/50 with both routes being signposted on the same road.

== Main cities on the I/50 route ==
- Bánovce nad Bebravou
- Nováky
- Prievidza
- Handlová
- Žiar nad Hronom
- Zvolen
- Detva
- Lučenec
- Rimavská Sobota
- Tornaľa
- Rožňava
- Moldava nad Bodvou
- Košice
- Sečovce
- Michalovce
- Sobrance

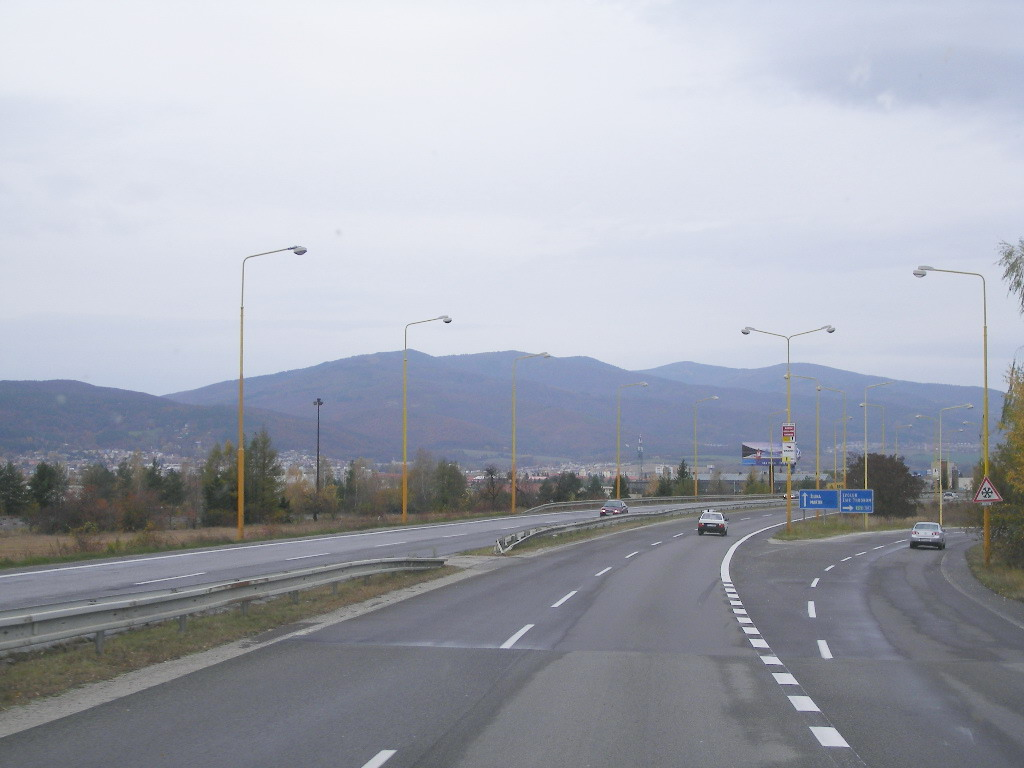
Part of I/50 in Prievidza

== See also ==
- Highway M08 (Ukraine)
