= Uzhhorod (border checkpoint) =

Uzhhorod Port of Entry
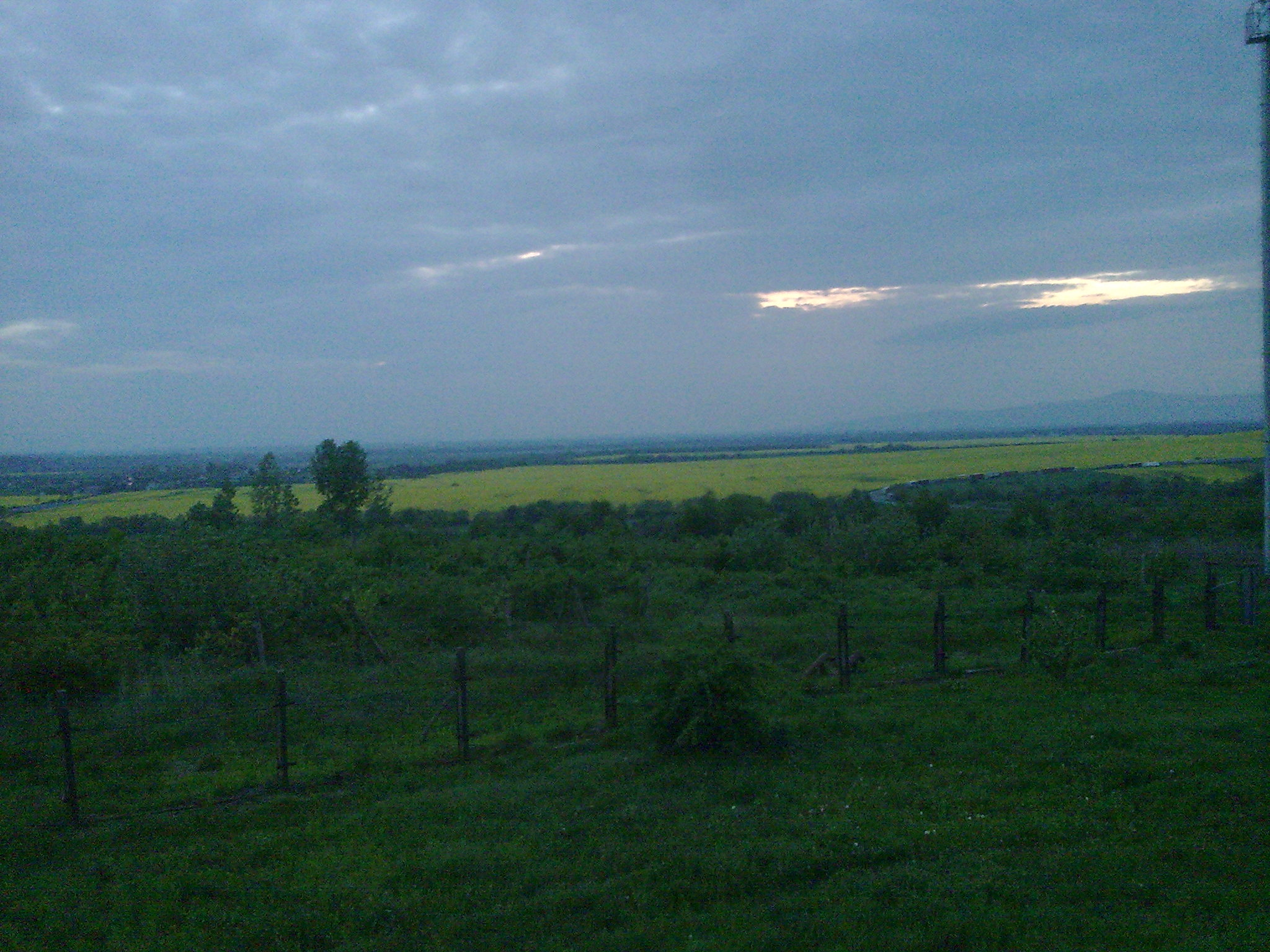
- View of the Ukrainian-Slovak border near the Uzhhorod checkpoint area

Location
- Country: Ukraine
- Location: Vulytsya Sobranet'ska, Uzhhorod
- Coordinates: 48°39′13″N 22°15′58″E

Uzhhorod is a land border crossing between Ukraine and Slovakia on the Ukrainian side, near the city of Uzhhorod. The crossing is situated on autoroute E50/E58 (M08). On the Slovakian side is the village of Vyšné Nemecké. The border also forms a frontier with the European Union (Schengen Area).

In January 2026 a pedestrian crossing has started operating at the Uzhhorod – Vyšné Nemecké border crossing.

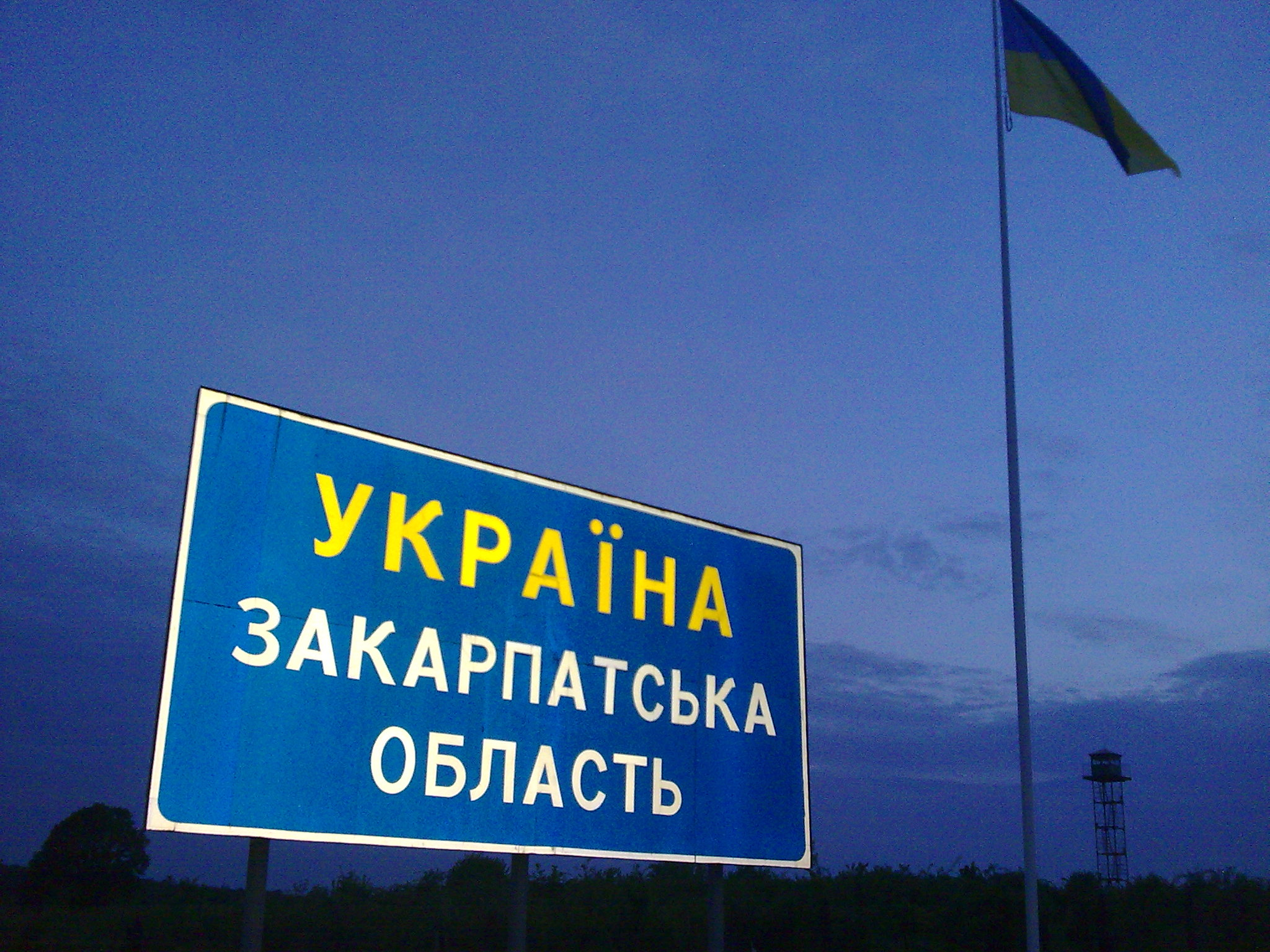
Entrance to Ukraine from Slovakia

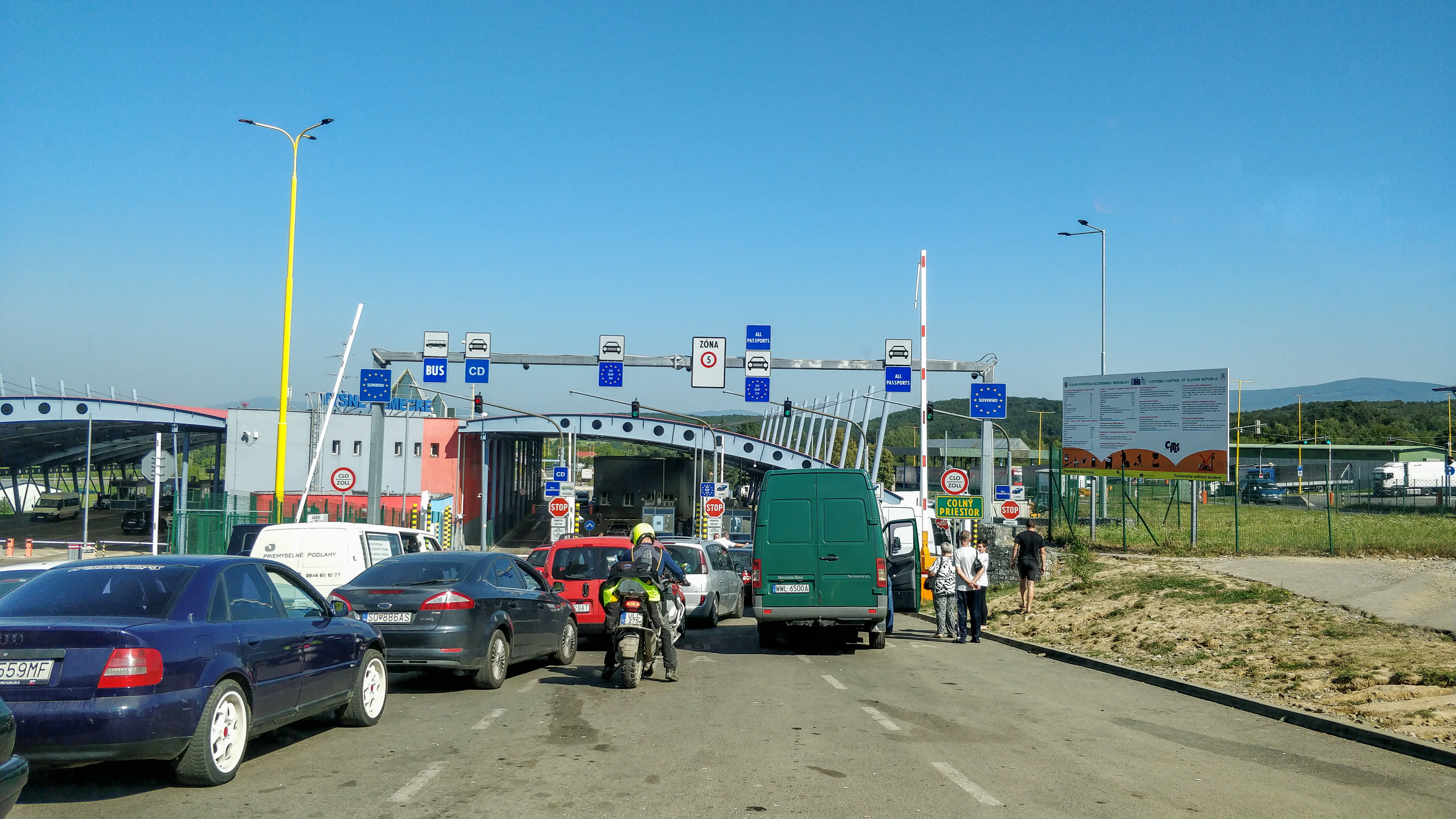
Uzhhorod-Vyšné Nemecké crossing, Slovak side

== See also ==
- State Border of Ukraine
- Uzhhorod Central Rail Terminal
