= FS Marjata =

Several Norwegian government vessels have been named FS Marjata:

- FS Marjata (1951), in service with Norwegian government 1965-1976 and then to navy as HNoMS Vadsø
- FS Marjata (1975), in service with Norwegian government 1976-1995, latterly as Marjata II
- FS Marjata (1992)
- FS Marjata (2014)
