= Morten Haga Lunde =

Norwegian military officer (born 1960)

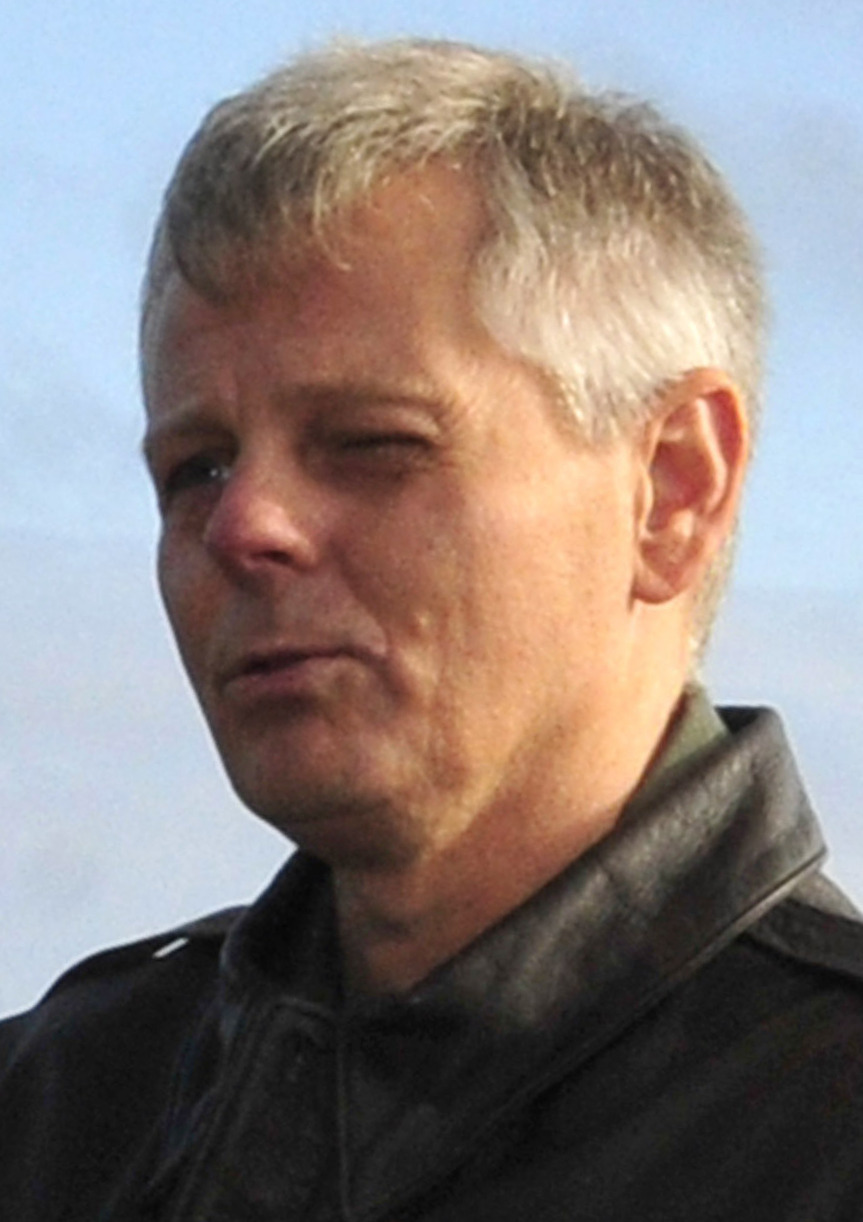
- Morten Haga Lunde, in 2011.
- Born: 20 December 1960 (age 65); Os Municipality, Norway
- Education: Norwegian Air Force Academy
- Occupation: military officer
- Awards: Nynorsk User of the Year (2017)

Morten Haga Lunde (born 20 December 1960) is a Norwegian military officer. He has been head of the Norwegian Joint Headquarters, and head of the Norwegian Intelligence Service.

== Life and career ==
Lunde was born in Os Municipality on 20 December 1960.

He graduated from the Norwegian Air Force Academy in 1987, and from the NATO Defense College in 2002. He was appointed head of Norwegian Joint Headquarters in 2013, with the rank of lieutenant general.

In 2015 he was appointed head of the Norwegian Intelligence Service. He received the Nynorsk User of the Year award in 2017.

Lunde served as head of the Norwegian Intelligence Service until November 2020, when he was succeeded by Nils Andreas Stensønes.
