= P53 road (Ukraine) =

Road in Ukraine

Road P53
- Автошлях Р53

Route information
- Length: 3.1 km (1.9 mi)

Major junctions
- east end: H 13 in Malyi Bereznyi
- west end: Slovak border

Location
- Country: Ukraine
- Oblasts: Zakarpattia

Highway system
- Roads in Ukraine; State Highways
← P 52	→ P 54

P53 road is a regional road (P-Highway) in Zakarpattia Oblast, Ukraine. It runs north-south and connects Malyi Bereznyi with a Slovakia-Ukraine border. It is one of the shortest routes.

It is also called Ublianska vulytsia (Ubl'a Street). It stretches along Ublia River that south of Malyi Bereznyi falls into Uzh River.

== Main route ==
Main route and connections to/intersections with other highways in Ukraine.
Marker	Main settlements	Notes	Highway Interchanges
Volyn Oblast
0 km	Malyi Bereznyi		Slovakia-Ukraine border
3.1 km	Malyi Bereznyi		Ublianska vulytsia • Tsentralna vulytsia ( H 13)

== See also ==
- Roads in Ukraine
