= Ernst W. Selmer =

Norwegian philologist and phonetician

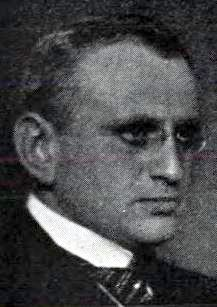

Ernst Westerlund Selmer (23 April 1890 – 14 April 1971) was a Norwegian philologist and phonetician. A professor at the University of Oslo from 1937 to 1960, he was best known for his work on Low German and North Frisian.

== Personal life ==
He was born in Funbo, Sweden as a son of Ludvig Marius Selmer (1860–1931) and Nina Maria Mathilda Westerlund (1868–1954). He grew up in Kristiania. He was a nephew of Johan Selmer and Jens Selmer, and a second cousin of Fredrik Selmer.

In March 1919 in Kristiania he married Ella Sejersted (1895–1968), a daughter of Colonel Nils Johannes Sejersted. He then became an uncle of Francis Sejersted, and the couple had several children. Knut Sejersted Selmer became a law professor, and married Elisabeth Schweigaard Selmer. Another son Ernst Sejersted Selmer became a mathematics professor.

A third son, Nicolay Sejersted Selmer, born 1921, studied at the Norwegian Institute of Technology, but during the Second World War he first fought in the Norwegian Campaign, then participated in the underground resistance before he fled to Little Norway in Canada in 1941 to undergo pilot training. His bomber plane crashed during training in January 1943.

== Career ==
Selmer finished his secondary education at Kristiania Cathedral School in 1908, and graduated with the cand.philol. degree in German language in 1913. He later studied in several cities abroad, such as Oxford, Montpellier, Leipzig and Marburg, in addition to being research assistant in Hamburg from 1915 to 1917. During this stay, when he studied languages under Conrad Borchling and experimental phonetics under Giulio Panconcelli-Calzia, he collected material in Low German, allowing him to release the doctoral thesis Sprachstudien im Lüneburger Wendland in 1918.

Selmer was a research fellow at the Royal Frederick University from 1917 to 1924, and from 1924 docent in the fields phonetics and Germanic philology. He headed the Institute of Phonetics from its foundation in 1918 to 1960, and became the cornerstone in phonetics teaching in Norway. He doubled as lecturer in German language at both the university and several schools from 1919 to 1937, until he served as professor of phonetics and Germanic philology from 1937 to 1960. His university was renamed the University of Oslo in 1939.

His textbook in phonetics, Håndbok i elementær fonetikk written with Olaf Broch and released in 1921, was used at the university throughout his career. On the German language he issued a grammar Tysk grammatikk for studerende og lærere (with Hjalmar Falk in 1934) and a phonetic textbook Tysk lydlære for lærere og studerende (1936). He also published works about Swedish (Öland) and Norwegian dialects as well as Faroese and Zulu, but became best known for his research on Low German and North Frisian.

Selmer was a fellow of the Norwegian Academy of Science and Letters (from 1922), the Royal Danish Academy of Sciences and Letters, the Fryske Akademy and the Linguistic Society of Uppsala. He died in April 1971 in Bærum.
