= Nils Andreas Stensønes =

Norwegian military officer (born 1964)

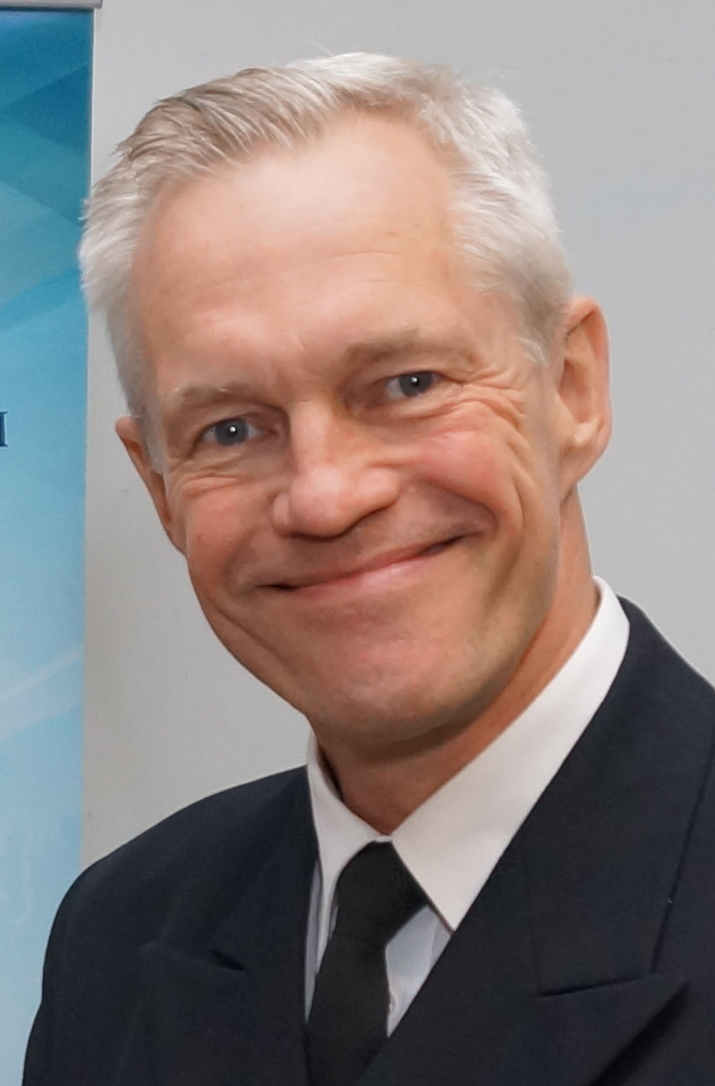

Head of the Intelligence Service
- Incumbent
- Assumed office October 2020
- Preceded by: Morten Haga Lunde

Chief of the Navy
- In office August 2017 – October 2020
- Preceded by: Lars Saunes
- Succeeded by: Rune Andersen

Personal details
- Born: 24 August 1964 (age 62) Ethiopia

Military service
- Allegiance: Norway
- Years of service: 1986-present
- Rank: Vice Admiral

Nils Andreas Stensønes (born 24 August 1964) is a Norwegian military officer who serves as the Head of the Norwegian Intelligence Service since October 2020. He served as Chief of the Navy from August 2017 to October 2020.

In September 2020, he was appointed as Head of the Intelligence Service; he began his work in this position on 3 November 2020, taking over from Morten Haga Lunde.

== Military medals and awards ==
Defence Service Medal with Laurel Branch
Norwegian Navy Medal of Merit
Defence Service Medal with two stars
Medal for Defence Operations Abroad - Operation Active Endeavour
Ribbon of Military Service Medal Navy with 3 stars
NATO Medal for Operation Active Endeavour
US Legion of Merit Commander
Ordre du Mérite Maritime
