= Chief of the Navy (Norway) =

- Sjef Sjøforsvaret
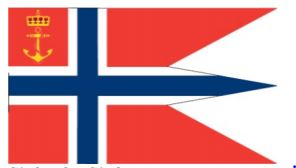

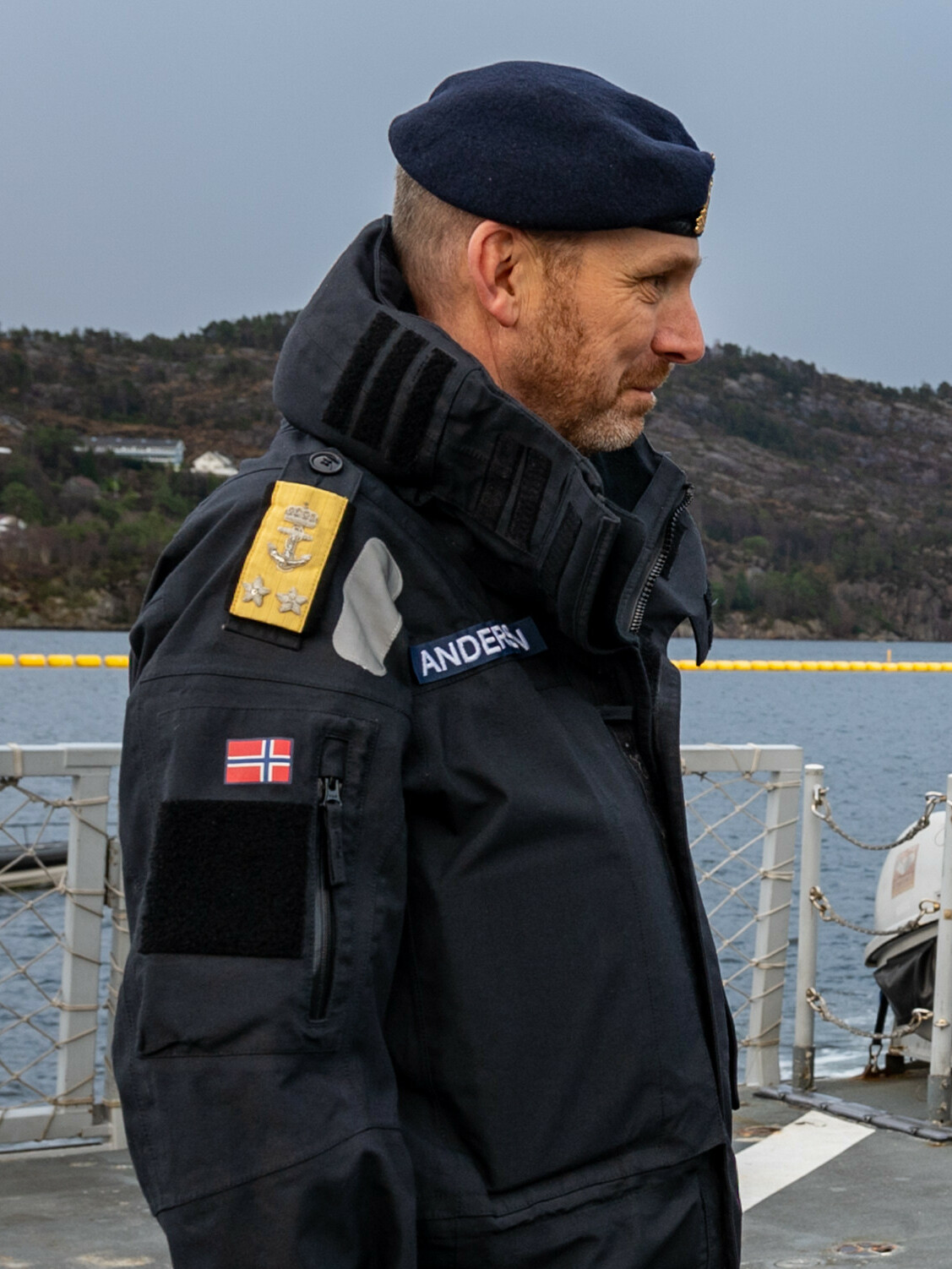
- Incumbent; Rune Andersen since 27 October 2020
- Royal Norwegian Navy
- Reports to: Chief of Defence
- Formation: 1901
- First holder: Christian Sparre

The Chief of the Navy (Norwegian: Sjef Sjøforsvaret) is the Commander–in–chief of the Royal Norwegian Navy.

The Chief of the Navy is head over the Naval Staff, the Coast Guard, The Fleet and the main naval bases. Presiding over close to 3600 soldiers, the Chief of the Navy has great responsibility to lead and defend. With the seas under his discretion, the Chief of the Navy watches over the seas which are seven times greater in area than that of Norway's mainland.

The Naval Staff is based at Haakonsvern Naval Base in Bergen, western Norway.

== Name of the position ==
- 1970 - 2017: General inspector of the Navy
- 2017 - today: Chief of the Navy

== List of chiefs ==
=== Commanding Admiral ===
No.	Picture	Commanding Admiral	Took office	Left office	Time in office
1	Christian Sparre	Vice admiral Christian Sparre (1859–1940)	22 December 1901	1910	8–9 years
2	Karl Friedrich Griffin Dawes	Rear admiral Karl Friedrich Griffin Dawes (1861–1941)	1910	1919	8–9 years
3	Alfred Berglund	Rear admiral Alfred Berglund (1862–1945)	1919	1930	10–11 years
4	Jakob von der Lippe	Rear admiral Jakob von der Lippe (1872–1953)	1930	August 1934	3–4 years
5	Edgar Otto	Rear admiral Edgar Otto (1872–1952)	August 1934	1938	3–4 years
6	Henry Diesen	Rear admiral Henry Diesen (1883–1953)	1938	August 1941	2–3 years

=== Chief of the Navy ===
No.	Picture	Chief of the Navy	Took office	Left office	Time in office
1	Elias Corneliussen	Rear admiral Elias Corneliussen (1881–1951)	August 1941	1946	4–5 years
2	Thore Horve	Vice admiral Thore Horve (1899–1990)	1946	May 1949	2–3 years
3	Edvard Christian Danielsen	Vice admiral Edvard Christian Danielsen (1888–1964)	May 1949	1951	1–2 years
4	Skule Storheill	Vice admiral Skule Storheill (1907–1992)	1951	1954	2–3 years
5	Peter J. Espeland Jacobsen	Vice admiral Peter J. Espeland Jacobsen	1954	1959	4–5 years
6	Erling G. Hostvedt	Vice admiral Erling G. Hostvedt	1959	1962	2–3 years
7	Aimar Sørenssen [no]	Vice admiral Aimar Sørenssen (1905–1986)	1962	1967	4–5 years
8	Magne Braadland	Vice admiral Magne Braadland	1967	1970	2–3 years

=== General Inspector for the Navy ===
- 1970–1974: Hans Skjong
- 1974–1976: Oddmund Peder Åkenes
- 1976–1980: Charles Oluf Herlofson
- 1980–1983: Roy Breivik
- 1983–1989: Bjarne Grimstvedt
- 1989–1992: Rolf Eilhardt Pedersen
- 1992–1995: Kjell Amund Prytz
- 1995–2000: Hans Kristian Svensholt
- 2000–2003: Kjell-Birger Olsen
- 2003–2008: Jan Eirik Finseth
- 2008–2011: Haakon Bruun-Hanssen
- 2011–2014: Bernt Grimstvedt
- 2014–2017: Lars Saunes

=== Chief of the Navy ===
No.	Picture	Chief of the Navy	Took office	Left office	Time in office	Ref.
1	Lars Saunes [no]	Rear admiral Lars Saunes (born 1959)	1 January 2017	16 August 2017	227 days	
2	Nils-Andreas Stensønes	Rear admiral Nils-Andreas Stensønes (born 1964)	16 August 2017	27 October 2020	3 years, 72 days	
3	Rune Andersen	Rear admiral Rune Andersen	27 October 2020	20 October 2023	2 years, 358 days	
4	Oliver Berdal [no]	Counter admiral Oliver Berdal (born 1975)	20 October 2023	Incumbent	2 years, 322 days	
