= Highway H13 (Ukraine) =

Highway in Ukraine

Highway H13
- Автошлях Н13
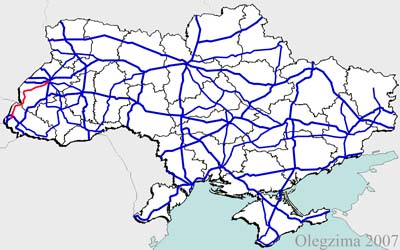

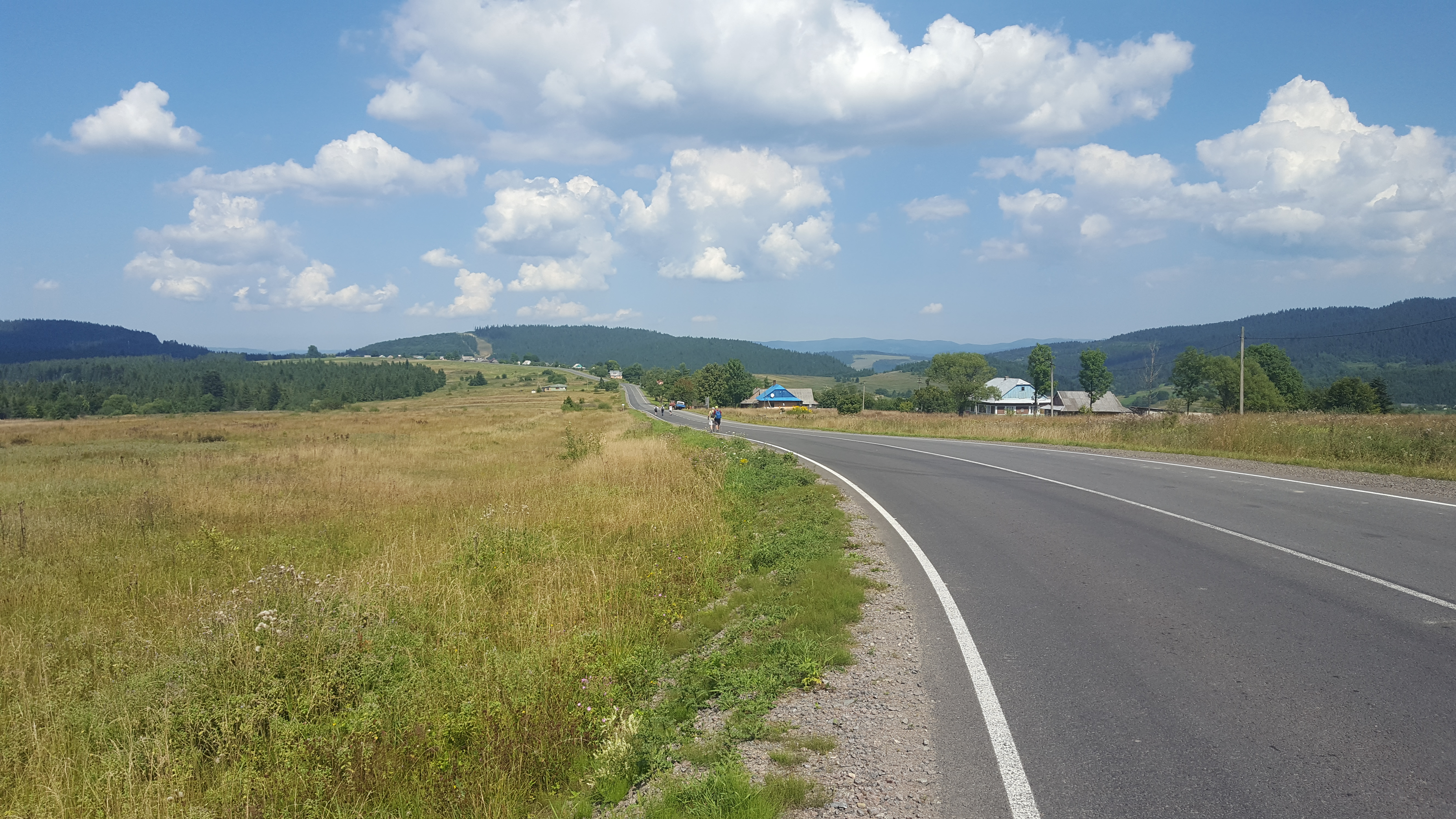

Route information
- Length: 232.5 km (144.5 mi)

Major junctions
- South end: E58 in Uzhhorod
- North end: M 11 in Lviv

Location
- Country: Ukraine
- Oblasts: Lviv, Zakarpattia

Highway system
- Roads in Ukraine; State Highways
← H 12	→ H 14

H13 is a national road (H-Highway) in Lviv Oblast and Zakarpattia Oblast, Ukraine. It runs north-south and connects Uzhhorod with Lviv.

== Main route ==
Main route and connections to/intersections with other highways in Ukraine.

Marker	Main settlements	Notes	Highway interchanges
Zakarpattia Oblast
0 km	Domanytsi	starts at highway interchange near Uzhhorod	E58 M 08
	Nevytske	Nevytsky Castle, Uzhhorod Military Training Center	
	Perechyn		T0712
	Malyi Bereznyi	bridge over Ublia	P 53
	Zabrid	bridge over Ulichka, Uzhansky National Park	
	Zhornava	bridge over Uzh	
	Stavne	bridge over Liskivsky brook	
	Lubnia	bridge over Uzh, bridge over Lubnia river	
	Uzhok	Uzhansky National Park/Nadsiansky Landscape Park	
	Sianky	Uzhok pass, near Poland-Ukraine border	
Lviv Oblast
	Hranytsia, Yavoriv	Nadsiansky Landscape Park	
	Verkhnie	Western Rehabilitation Sports Center	
	Borynia		T1423
	Turka		T141902
	Staryi Sambir		T1401
	Sambir		T1415 • T1418
	Novyi Kalyniv	Kalyniv Avia base	
	Zaluzhany	Jagiellon Airport	T1425
154.4 km	Lapayivka	near Lviv	M 11

== See also ==
- Roads in Ukraine
