= FS Marjata (2014) =

Ship built in 2016

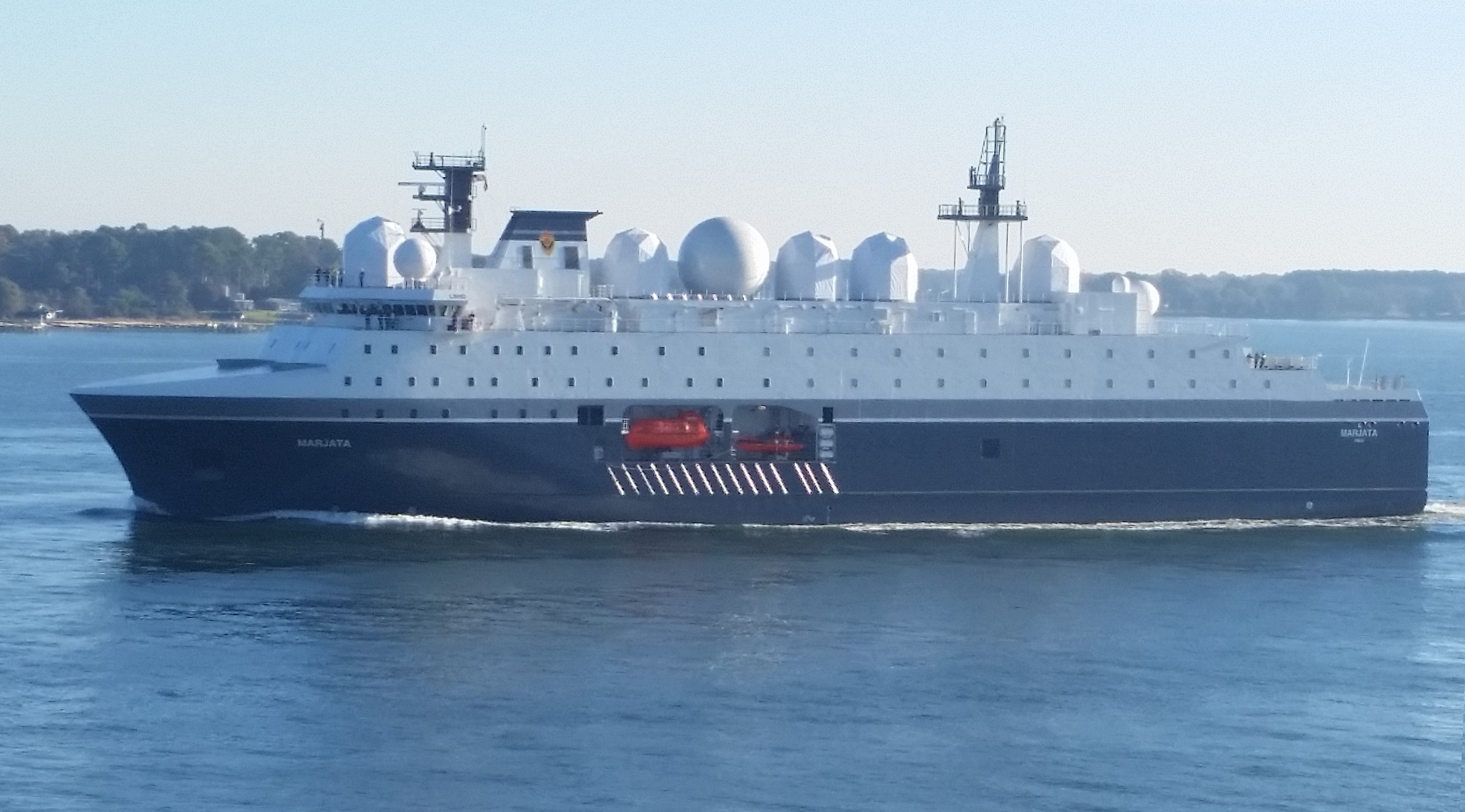
Marjata in the York River, Virginia, United States on 3 November 2015

FS Marjata is a Norwegian purpose-built electronic intelligence collection vessel (ELINT), which was ordered by the parliament in 2010. It was baptized on 6 December 2014 by Prime Minister Erna Solberg. The ship is crewed by the Norwegian Intelligence Service.

== Role and specifications ==
The ship is the fourth bearing the name Marjata. The first was operative in the period 1966–1975, the second in the period 1976-1995 and the third 1995-(still operating, but renamed FS Eger). Marjata was intended as the replacement for her predecessor, but it was decided to keep both for the same role. Previously, these ships were called research ships, but the new Marjata is the first to officially conduct intelligence as well. On some missions she has been accompanied by her predecessor, FS Eger; these missions are often intelligence or spy missions. The ship has neither weapons nor helicopters on board. The ship measures 5000 gt, 126 meters long and 23.5 meters wide.

== Construction ==
The Norwegian parliament granted in 2009 money to invest in a new intelligence vessel. The Norwegian Defence Logistics Organisation announced the project in 2011, and the company Vard Langsten (now Fincantieri) was given the contract after competing with several other Norwegian shipyards. The hull is built by Vard Tulcea in Romania, while Vard Langsten in Tomrefjorden in Romsdal completed the ship. The installment of the technical equipment took place from April to November 2015 at Naval Weapons Station Yorktown in Virginia.

The vessel had a cost framework of NOK 1.5 billion. Some sources say NOK 1.2 billion, but the cost frame has subsequently increased from 1,246 billion to NOK 1,379 billion. The new ship is 126 meters long and 23.5 meters wide and came into operation in 2016.

== Change of homeport ==
When the ship entered service in 2016 the NIS confirmed her homeport would be at Kirkenes, only 7 km from the Norwegian-Russian border.

In 2019 the NIS denied to confirm Kirkenes as her home port when asked by the Norwegian online newspaper aldrimer.no. In July 2020 the Norwegian Ministry of Defence confirmed that Harstad, 334 km to the west, is the new official homeport for the intelligence ship.

Over the last few years, the region of eastern Finnmark county, and Kirkenes in particular, has been troubled by Russian jamming of GPS signals.
