= Lipníky =

Municipality of Slovakia

- Municipality
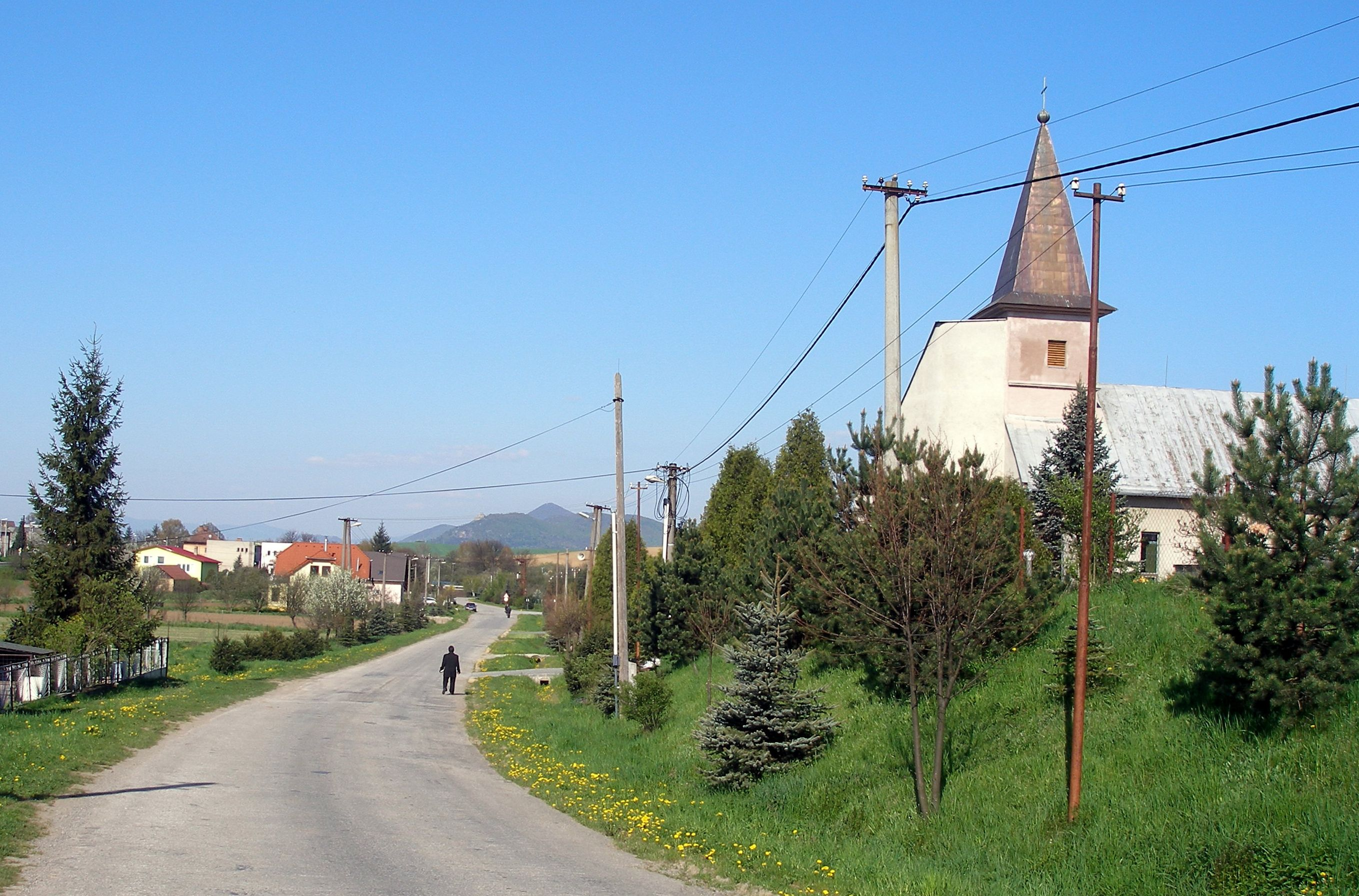

- Flag

- Location of Lipníky in the Prešov Region Location of Lipníky in Slovakia
- Coordinates: 49.05°N 21.41°E
- Country: Slovakia
- Region: Prešov Region
- District: Prešov District
- First mentioned: 1990

Area
  - Total: 3.79 km^{2} (1.46 sq mi)
- Elevation: 302 m (991 ft)

Population (2025)
  - Total: 599
- Time zone: UTC+1 (CET)
  - Summer (DST): UTC+2 (CEST)
- Postal code: 821 2
- Area code: +421 51
- Vehicle registration plate (until 2022): PO
- Website: www.lipniky.sk

Lipníky is a village and municipality in Prešov District in the Prešov Region of eastern Slovakia.

== History ==
The village was built in 1990 making it one of the newest settlements in the entire country of Slovakia.

== Geography ==
The municipality lies at an altitude of 302 metres (991 ft) and covers an area of 3.79 km^{2} (1.46 sq mi) (2025).

== Population ==
Population statistic (10 years)
Year	1995	2005	2015	2025
Count	444	464	478	599
Difference		+4.50%	+3.01%	+25.31%

Population statistic
Year	2024	2025
Count	587	599
Difference		+2.04%

It has a population of 599 people (31 December 2025).

=== Ethnicity ===
Census 2021 (1+ %)
Ethnicity	Number	Fraction
Slovak	528	99.24%
Total	532	

In year 2021 was 532 people by ethnicity 528 as Slovak, 2 as Rusyn, 2 as Not found out, 1 as Turkish, 1 as German and 1 as Other.

Note on population: The difference values of population numbers in the table "Population statistic" and in the sections "Ethnicity" & "Religion" is caused by the use of various statistical methods.

=== Religion ===
Census 2021 (1+ %)
Religion	Number	Fraction
Roman Catholic Church	280	52.63%
Evangelical Church	171	32.14%
Greek Catholic Church	36	6.77%
None	34	6.39%
Not found out	6	1.13%
Total	532	

In year 2021 was 532 people by religion 280 from Roman Catholic Church, 171 from Evangelical Church, 36 from Greek Catholic Church, 34 from None, 6 from Not found out, 2 from Ad hoc movements, 1 from Jehovah's Witnesses, 1 from Islam and 1 from Buddhism.
