= Olaf Broch =

Norwegian linguist (1867–1961)

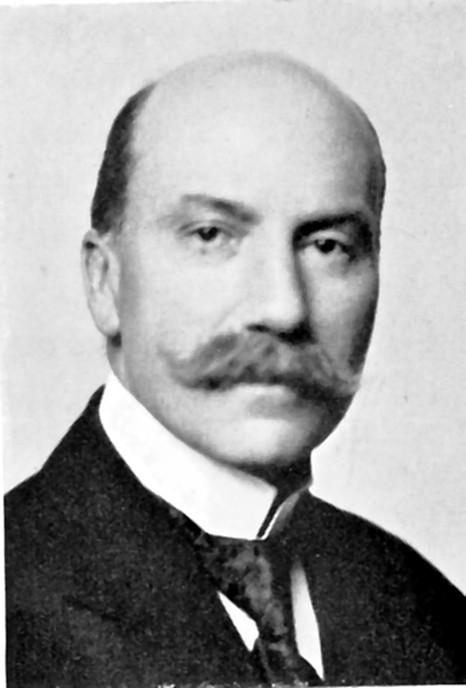
- Born: 4 August 1867; Horten, Norway
- Died: 28 January 1961 (aged 93); Oslo
- Occupation: Linguist
- Employer: University of Oslo
- Spouse: Ninni Henriette Trampe
- Relatives: Lagertha Broch (1864–1952), sister; Nanna Broch (1879–1971), sister; Hjalmar Broch (1882–1969), brother
- Awards: Order of St. Olav (1946)

Olaf Broch (4 August 1867, Horten – 28 January 1961, Oslo) was a Norwegian Slavist and phonetician. He established Slavic studies in Norway and made significant contributions to Slavic dialectology and phonetics.

== Life and work ==
Broch was born in Horten, and was a brother of children's writer Lagertha Broch, zoologist Hjalmar Broch, and social worker Nanna Broch. He married Ninni Henriette Trampe in 1896.

He studied Slavic languages in Russia, Leipzig and Vienna under August Leskien, Karl Brugmann, Filipp Fortunatov, and Vatroslav Jagić. It was in Jagić's journal Archiv für slavische Philologie where he published his first article in 1895, a study of the Ubľa dialect. In the following years Broch made many extensive dialectological trips in Slavic countries, resulting in studies of Russian, Slovak, Belarusian, and Serbian Torlak dialects. The latter study, done on Jagić's initiative and published in 1903, was the first book-length study of a Serbian dialect; it was extensively analysed and partly criticised by Aleksandar Belić in 1911, who was carrying out studies of the dialect at the same time and published his own study of it in 1905. In his studies of Russian dialects, Broch was the first to notice and describe dialects with two additional vowels /ѣ/ and /ω/, stimulating further research into the matter, including the influential 1914 study of the village Leka dialect by Broch's close colleague Aleksey Shakhmatov.

Having experience with analysing phonetics of various Slavic dialects, Broch was invited by Jagić to write a volume on the general phonetics of Slavic languages for his Encyclopedia of Slavic Philology. Published in Russian (1910) and German (1911), it is regarded as Broch's most important scholarly contribution. The book was written to a large degree on the basis of Broch's personal observation of various Slavic speakers, and less frequently on instrumental measurements.

After the First World War, Broch published a book on general phonetics (1921, co-authored with Ernst W. Selmer), manuals for teaching Russian (a Russian grammar in 1936), and a study on Russenorsk.

He translated works by Leo Tolstoy and Fyodor Dostoyevsky into Norwegian, as well as shorter fiction by other Slavic writers. In 1923 he published The Dictatorship of the Proleteriat, a book of impressions of his stay in Moscow and Saint Petersburg the same year, in which he expressed strong criticism of the Soviet society.

Broch was the first professor of Slavic languages at the University of Oslo, where he taught from 1900 to 1937. He was decorated Commander of the Order of St. Olav in 1946. He was a member of a number of foreign academies, but was dismissed from Academy of Sciences of the Soviet Union in 1949 due to "anti-Soviet activity".

== Publications ==
The following bibliography entails works published as independent books. A more complete bibliography of Broch's works was published in:

- Gallis, Arne (1957). "A bibliography of Olaf Broch's published writings". Scando-Slavica. 3: 1–15. doi:10.1080/00806765708600255 – via Taylor & Francis.

=== Books ===
- Studien von der slovakisch-kleinrussischen Sprachgrenze im östlichen Ungarn [Studies of the Slovak-Ukrainian Language Border in East Hungary], 1897
- Weitere Studien von der slovakisch-kleinrussischen Sprachgrenze im östlichen Ungarn [Further Studies of the Slovak-Ukrainian Language Border in East Hungary], 1899
- Угрорусское нарѣчіе села Убли (Земплинскаго комитата) [Ugro-Russian Dialect of the Village Ubľa (Zemplín County)], 1899
- Die Dialekte des südlichsten Serbiens [The Dialects of Southernmost Serbia], 1903
- Описаніе одного говора изъ юго-западной части Тотемскаго уѣзда [A Description of a Dialect of the South-Western Part of Totemsky Uyezd], 1907
- Очеркъ физіологіи славянскиой рѣчи [A Study of the Physiology of Slavic Speech], 1910
  - German translation: Slavische Phonetik [Slavic Phonetics], 1911
- Говоры къ западу отъ Мосальска [Dialects West of Mosalsk], 1916
- with Ernst W. Selmer: Håndbok i elementær fonetikk [Manual of Elementary Phonetics], ¹1921, ⁵1950
- Proletariatets diktatur: Set og tænkt fra forsommeren 1923. [The Dictatorship of the Proleteriat: Experiences and Thoughts from Spring 1923], ¹1923, ²1924 (shortened edition)
  - translations: Swedish (1924), French (1925), Russian (2018)
- Russisk grammatikk [Russian Grammar], ¹1936, ³1946
- with Boris Kleiber: Lærebok i russisk [A Textbook of Russian], 1945

=== Translations ===
- Leo Tolstoj: Anna Karenin, 1911
- F. M. Dostojevski: Brødrene Karamasov, 1915
- Nestor Kotljarevskij: Det nittende århundre, 1946
