= Experimental phonetics =

Branch of phonetics

Experimental phonetics is the branch of general phonetics that deals with the study of the sounds and other human speech units by applying the experimental method. This scientific field covers basic areas of phonetics - articulatory phonetics, acoustic phonetics and auditory phonetics. Moreover, experimental method used in study of the segmental phonetics and suprasegmental phonetics, in exploration of the typological phonetics. Experimental phonetics is used to test theories or hypotheses in order to support or disprove them.

== See also ==
- Phonetics
- Speech processing
