= Norwegian ship Eger =

Norwegian electronic intelligence collection vessel

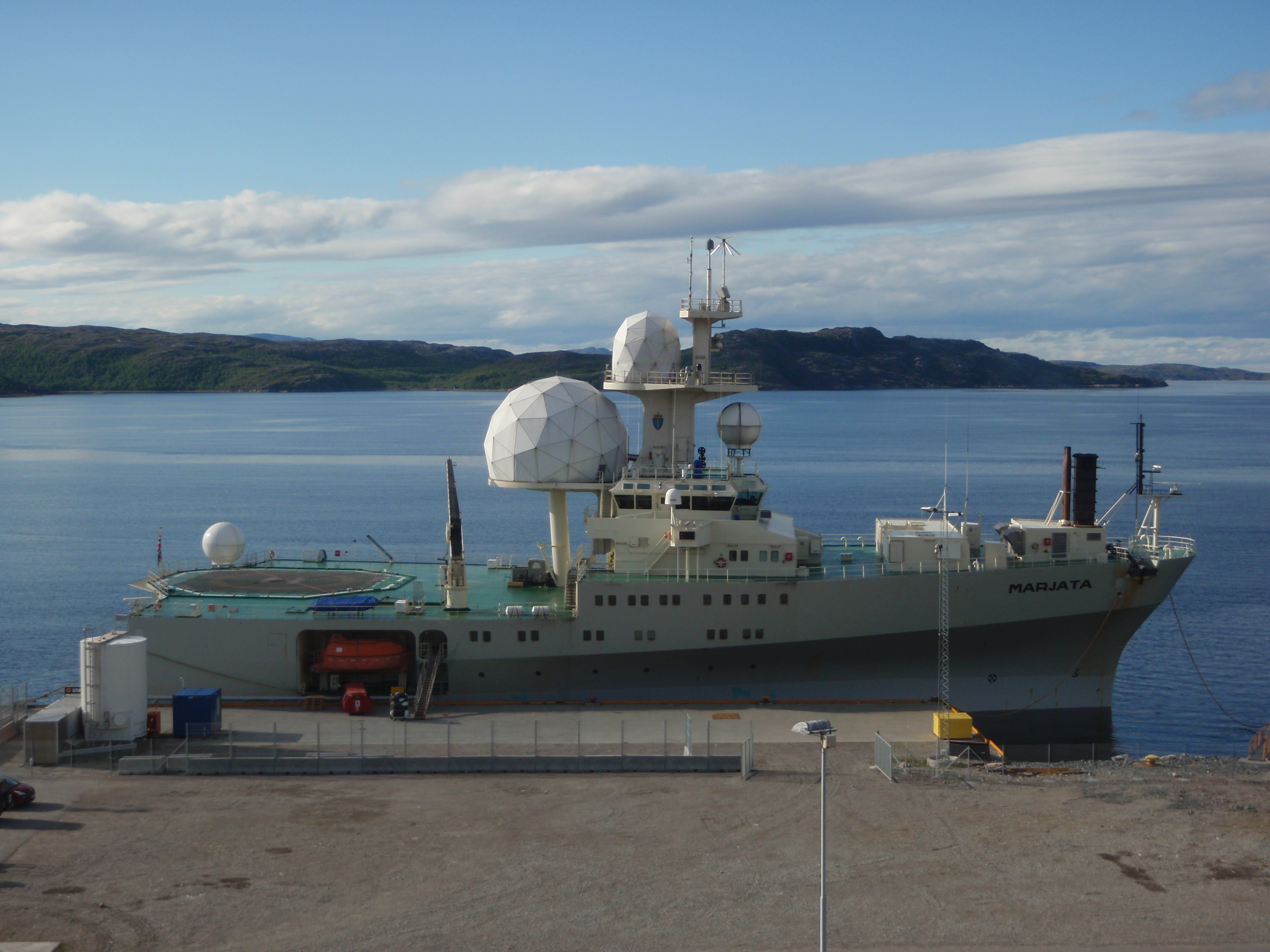
- Eger in Kirkenes, Norway in 2011.

History

Norway
- Name: Marjata
- Owner: Norwegian Defence Research Establishment
- Operator: Norwegian Intelligence Service
- Ordered: 1991
- Builder: Langsten shipyard, Aker Yards, Tomrefjord, Norway
- Yard number: 160
- Launched: 18 December 1992
- Commissioned: 1995
- Home port: Karljohansvern, Horten
- Identification: IMO number: 9107277; MMSI number: 258010000; Callsign: LGTH
- Status: In service

General characteristics
- Type: Military intelligence ship (ELINT)
- Displacement: 7,560 tons (full load)
- Length: 81.5 m (267 ft 5 in)
- Beam: 40 m (131 ft 3 in)
- Draught: 6 m (19 ft 8 in)
- Propulsion: 2 × diesel engines and 2 × gas turbines
- Speed: 15 knots (28 km/h; 17 mph)
- Complement: unknown
- Aviation facilities: Helipad

Eger (Marjata for most of its career) is a purpose-built electronic intelligence collection vessel (ELINT).

She is the third ship that bears the name Marjata; (Note: The name has no meaning in Norwegian. It was created for the first Marjata by the head of Norwegian Navy intelligence, Alf Martens Meyer, from the initials of himself (his nickname "Mamen") and his family – wife Annie, three sons Roy, Jan and Alf, as well as daughters-in-law Turid and Anne.) the first was operational in the period of 1966-1975 and the second during the years 1976–1995. All of these ships have been used for military intelligence purposes by the Norwegian Armed Forces, the first two entering service during the Cold War.

She is owned by the Norwegian Defence Research Establishment, but operated by the Norwegian Intelligence Service, and is considered to be one of the most advanced ships of her kind in the world. Her main role is surveillance of the Russian Northern fleet's activity in the Barents Sea, but is constructed for operations all over the world. She operates in international waters close to the Russian border. Marjata officially serves as a research ship for the Norwegian Intelligence Service.

== Construction ==
The ship was contracted in March 1991 from Aker Yards and was commissioned in 1995 after the technological development had made the former vessels no longer covered their role. The ship is specially designed for its purpose and is designed to have low self-noise so that it does not interfere with signature measurements and has high stability so sensors can be operated from a stable platform. To achieve high stability, the ship is remarkably wide, a form referred to as "framework form". The form makes it popularly called the "iron".

== Role and specifications ==
The ship can continue to operate even with large parts of the interior under the waterline, when the ship's exact trimming is uncritical. The same goes for cargo shift, if the ship is exposed to icing or large amounts of water on deck. The ship is additionally equipped to operate in arctic waters for long periods, but it is also designed for operations in other marine areas. With the high stability of the hull and the overall structure of the structure to withstand large amounts of icing, it is believed that operation in polar northern areas can last without interruption for very long periods. The ship is listed as a surveillance/intelligence vessel. Eger is also known as a spy ship and has done various spy operations throughout the years.

It is a Ramform type ship-design with an unusual hull shape. The shape of the hull is characteristic with a sharp bow, sinusoidal waterline, a descending rear body that ends in a straight cut-off stern where the ship has the largest width. Because of the very large width of the ship it will have an operational metacentric height of about 16 meters. Marjata is a very stable sensor platform, built with a very low noise signature, so that the ship itself does not interfere with the onboard sensors. Marjata also has large internal bay for computing and analyzing of reconnaissance data. The ramform type ships are often used for seismological surveys of the seabed. Marjata is well suited for operation in arctic conditions for prolonged periods of time.

== Marjata and the Kursk disaster ==
The various ships that have borne the name Marjata have always been looked upon with disapproval by the Russian, and former Soviet, authorities.

The ship was in the area when the K-141 Kursk submarine accident occurred. It was located 19 kilometres (12 mi) away when it reportedly registered a "soft explosion". A little while later, an earthquake measuring device picked up a second explosion thought to have occurred when Kursk hit the seabed and 5–7 torpedo warheads detonated, estimated to be equal to two tons of TNT. During the salvage of Kursk, there was considerable disagreement about Marjata's position and actions. Russian authorities argued that the ship had been too aggressive and could have disrupted salvage work. Norwegian authorities rejected the accusations.

== Service life ==
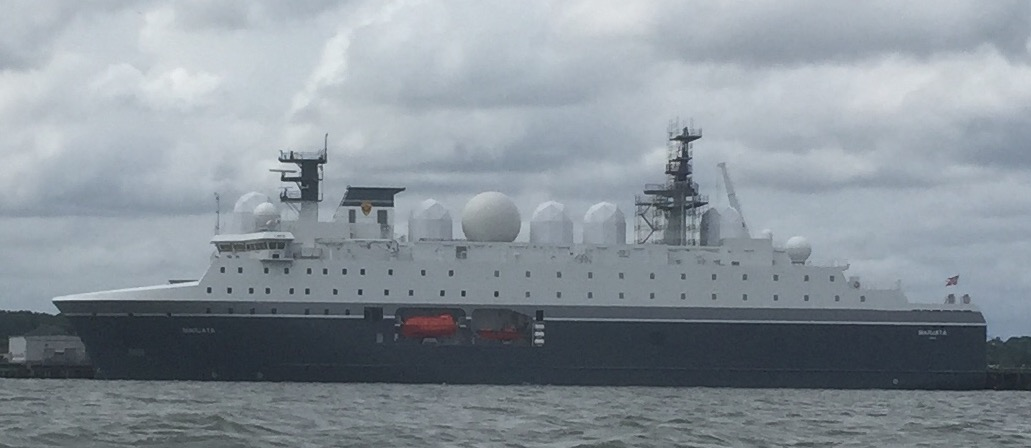
The newest Marjata docked at the Naval Weapons Station on the York River

The ship performed surveillance and spy missions for the Norwegian Navy throughout it service time. Marjata (iii) was replaced by a new and larger ship in 2016. The new ship, the fourth Marjata, was docked at the Naval Weapons Station on the York River in the United States for the summer of 2015.

After Marjata was put into service by 2017, the Eger was converted into a vessel for maritime surveillance, ready for operations in the Norwegian Sea, beginning in the first half of 2017. Though the Marjata was supposed to replace her predecessor, Eger, they have been reported to have worked together on multiple missions. The vessel was therefore renamed the Eger.
