= Nanna Broch =

Norwegian social worker (1879–1971)

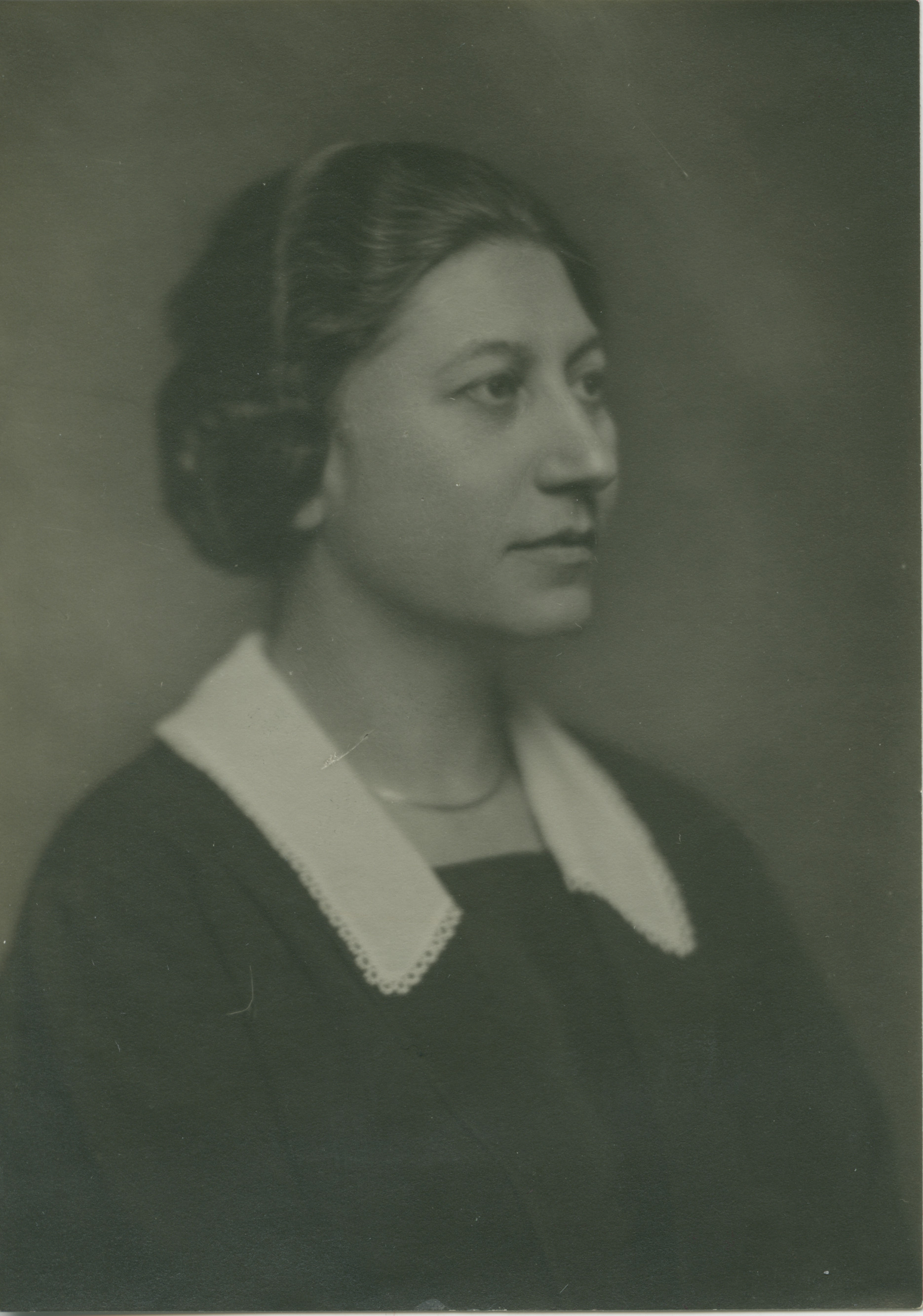
Nanna Broch ca. 1920

Nanna Broch (27 October 1879 – 1971) was a Norwegian social worker. She was born in Horten, a daughter of the merchant and brewery owner Johan Anthony Zincke Broch. She was a sister of the children's writer Lagertha Broch, the zoologist Hjalmar Broch and the linguist Olaf Broch.

Broch was appointed housing inspector for the health authorities in the municipality of Oslo from 1919 to 1945. She was co-founder of the association Østkantutstillingen in 1927, and hosted more than ninety exhibitions focusing on improving living conditions, in particular among the working class. Among her best known exhibitions were "Flaskeberget" on the effects of alcoholism and "Vasshølet" on women's burden in carrying water.
