= State Border of Ukraine =

International boundary of Ukraine

Map of Ukraine's internationally recognised borders

Ukrainian border road sign

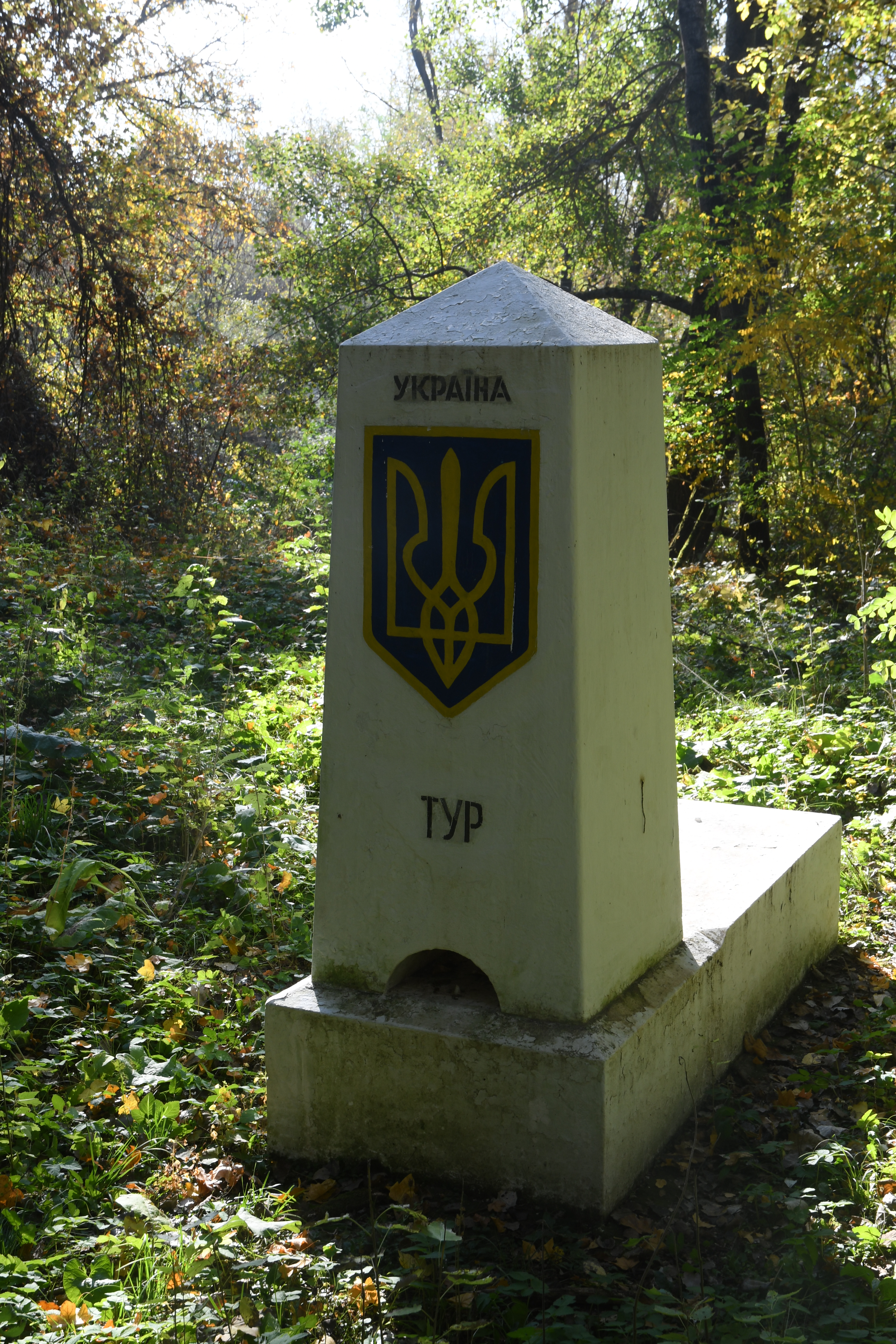
Border monument located at the tripoint with Hungary and Romania on the banks of the Tur river

The state border of Ukraine (Ukrainian: Державний кордон України, romanized: Derzhavnyi Kordon Ukrayiny; abbreviated as DerzhKordon) is the internationally recognized boundary of Ukraine, encompassing its land, maritime territory, and airspace. The border is jointly secured by the State Border Guard Service of Ukraine and the Armed Forces of Ukraine.

== Land boundaries ==
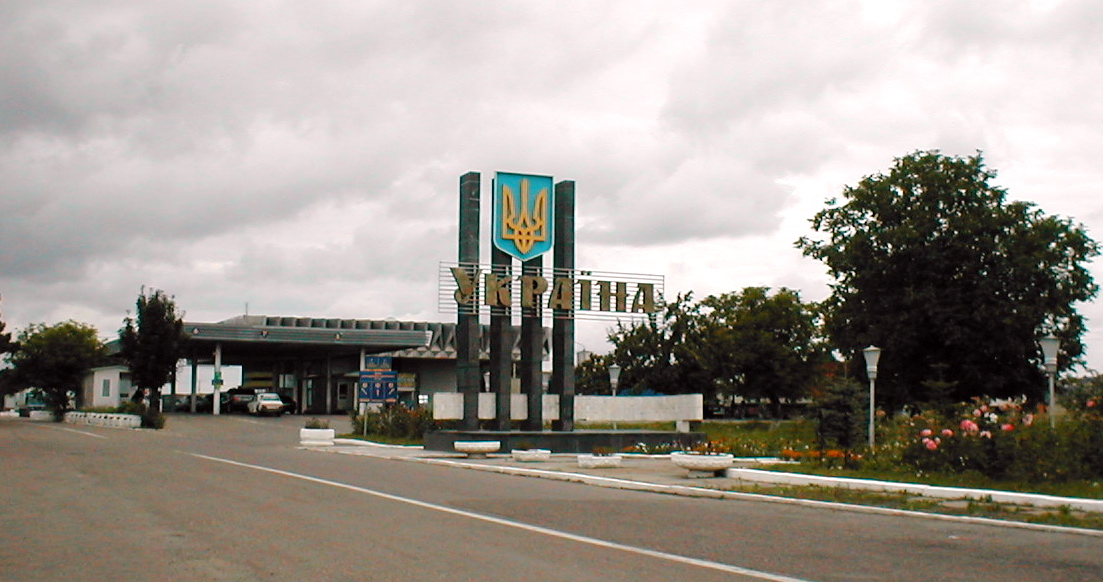
Romania–Ukraine border near Siret

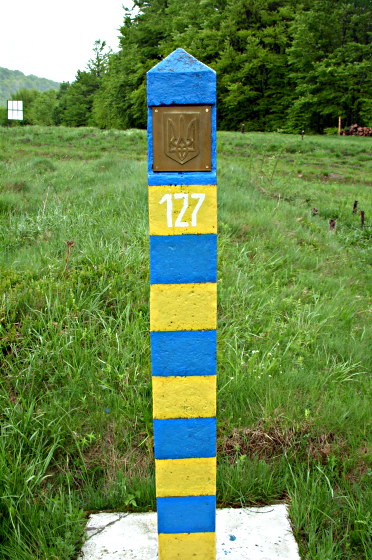
Typical border marker of Ukraine

Ukraine shares land borders with seven countries: Belarus, Hungary, Moldova, Poland, Romania, Russia and Slovakia. These boundaries largely follow the demarcations established during the Soviet Union. The total length of Ukraine's international borders is 6,992.98 km (4,345.24 mi). The area of the exclusive economic zone of Ukraine is 72,658 km^{2} (28,053 sq mi).

Ukraine's terrestrial borders span 5,637.98 km (3,503.28 mi). Below is a breakdown of its land boundaries with neighboring states:

Country		Border Length with Ukraine
Belarus		975.2 km (606.0 mi) including 325.9 km (202.5 mi) by rivers
Moldova		1,222 km (759 mi) including 267 km (166 mi) by rivers (includes 452 km [281 mi] border with Transnistria.)
Russia		2,063 km (1,282 mi) including 1,974.04 km (1,226.61 mi) by land and 321 km (199 mi) by sea
Poland	European Union	542.39 km (337.03 mi) including 187.3 km (116.4 mi) by rivers
Slovakia	European Union	97.85 km (60.80 mi) including 2.3 km (1.4 mi) by rivers
Hungary	European Union	136.7 km (84.9 mi) including 85.1 km (52.9 mi) by rivers
Romania	European Union	613.8 km (381.4 mi) including 292.2 km (181.6 mi) by rivers and sea

== Maritime borders ==
Exclusive economic zones of the Black Sea

=== Black Sea ===
Ukraine's southern maritime border follows the outer limits of its territorial waters in the Black Sea. It shares maritime boundaries with Romania and Russia, with additional interactions in contested regions.

==== Exclusive economic zones ====
- Romania–Ukraine border: Extends 33 km (21 mi) from the terminus of their land border into the Black Sea, demarcating the boundary between Ukrainian territorial waters and Romania's exclusive economic zone (EEZ).
- Snake Island: A Ukrainian territorial feature near the Danube Delta, critical for defining the EEZ. In 2009, the International Court of Justice adjusted the maritime boundary, granting Ukraine sovereignty over most waters around the island.
- Kerch Strait: Ukraine's EEZ extends 22.2 km (13.8 mi) southward from its Black Sea coast toward the strait, adjoining Russia's EEZ.

==== Russia–Ukraine maritime boundary ====
The maritime border with Russia begins south of the Kerch Strait, where the Russian and Ukrainian EEZs meet. From there, it runs northward for 22.5 km (14.0 mi) through the strait, dividing territorial waters. The boundary continues into the Sea of Azov, designated as shared internal waters under a 2003 treaty, though this status is disputed following Russia's 2014 annexation of Crimea.

==== Sea of Azov ====
Within the Sea of Azov, the Russia–Ukraine maritime border spans 249.5 km (155.0 mi), extending to the northern coast where it meets the terrestrial border.

=== Total length ===
Ukraine's total maritime border measures 1,355 km (842 mi):

- Black Sea: 1,056.5 km (656.5 mi)
- Sea of Azov and Kerch Strait: 298.5 km (185.5 mi)

== Disputes with Russia ==
Disputes on the demarcation of borders with Russia, Belarus, and Moldova (formerly republics of the Soviet Union) are unresolved. The disputes with Russia and Belarus were further exacerbated with the start of the Russo-Ukrainian war.

In 1994, the Budapest Memorandum on Security Assurances promised, inter alia, that its signatories (the Russian Federation, the United States of America, and the United Kingdom) would respect Ukraine's existing borders. Further negotiations with Russia began in 1998. In 2004, a treaty concerning shared use of Azov Sea and the Kerch Strait was ratified by the parliaments of both countries, but left delimitation of maritime borders subject to follow-up negotiations. It has been argued that Russia showed little interest in advancing these discussions.

=== Crimea ===
Since the 2014 Russian occupation and annexation of Crimea, Ukraine does not have de facto control of the peninsula, and considers it to be under temporary occupation. Ukraine and the majority of the international community consider Crimea to be an autonomous republic of Ukraine and Sevastopol to be one of Ukraine's cities with special status, while Russia considers Crimea to be a federal subject of Russia and Sevastopol to be one of Russia's three federal cities.

Since 1991 Russia had leased Sevastopol Naval Base. In 2010, following the Kharkiv Pact, Ukraine gave the Russian Sea Fleet an exclusive 25-year lease for part of the territory of Sevastopol. The Russian State Duma unanimously dissolved the lease for the base in the same month that Russia occupied Crimea.

On 1 January 2018, Ukraine introduced biometric controls for Russian citizens entering the country. On 22 March 2018, Ukrainian President Petro Poroshenko signed a decree that required Russian citizens and "individuals without citizenship, who come from migration risk countries” (more details were not given) to notify the Ukrainian authorities in advance about their reason for travelling to Ukraine. Since 1 July 2022, Russian citizens were required to apply for a visa to enter Ukraine. During the first 4.5 months these visas were in effect, 10 visas had been issued and 7 Russian citizens legally entered Ukraine (most for humanitarian reasons).

=== Southern and Eastern Ukraine ===
Since the Russian full-scale invasion of Ukraine, the Russian military has captured large swaths of territory across Southern and Eastern Ukraine. On 30 September, after Russian authorities conducted annexation referendums in four oblasts which are widely considered illegitimate, Russian President Putin declared these oblasts as sovereign Russian territory, further disputing the internationally recognized border.

== Former dispute with Romania ==
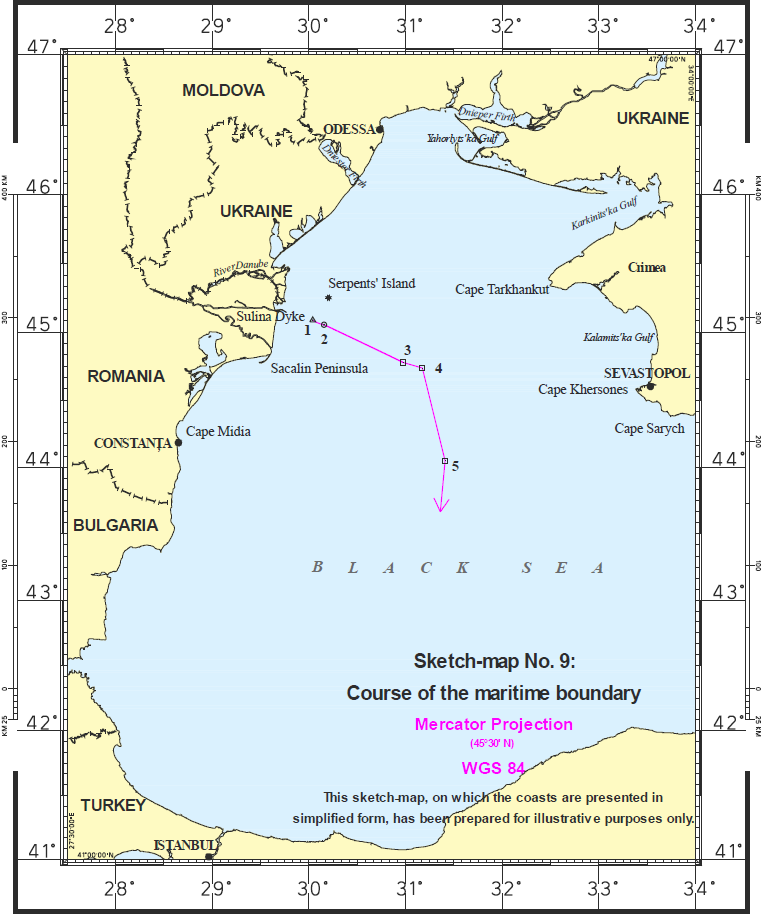
Final ruling of International Court of Justice on territorial waters.

From Ukraine's independence, Romania had contested Ukraine's claims to Snake Island and associated territorial waters, especially their claimed exclusive economic zone (EEZ).

Romania initially did not recognize Snake Island as sovereign Ukrainian territory, but later decided to reclassify the island as a rock without rights on the adjacent territorial waters and EEZ. The island which has an area of 16 ha (40 acres) is strategically important for the control over the Danube delta and the surrounding waters.

Currently the dispute is settled and Snake Island was recognized as the part of Ukrainian territory, however its adjacent waters (EEZ of Ukraine) became limited.

== See also ==
- Maritime delimitation between Romania and Ukraine
- Bystroye Channel
- Black Sea Fleet
