= Drietoma =

Village and municipality in Slovakia

- Municipality
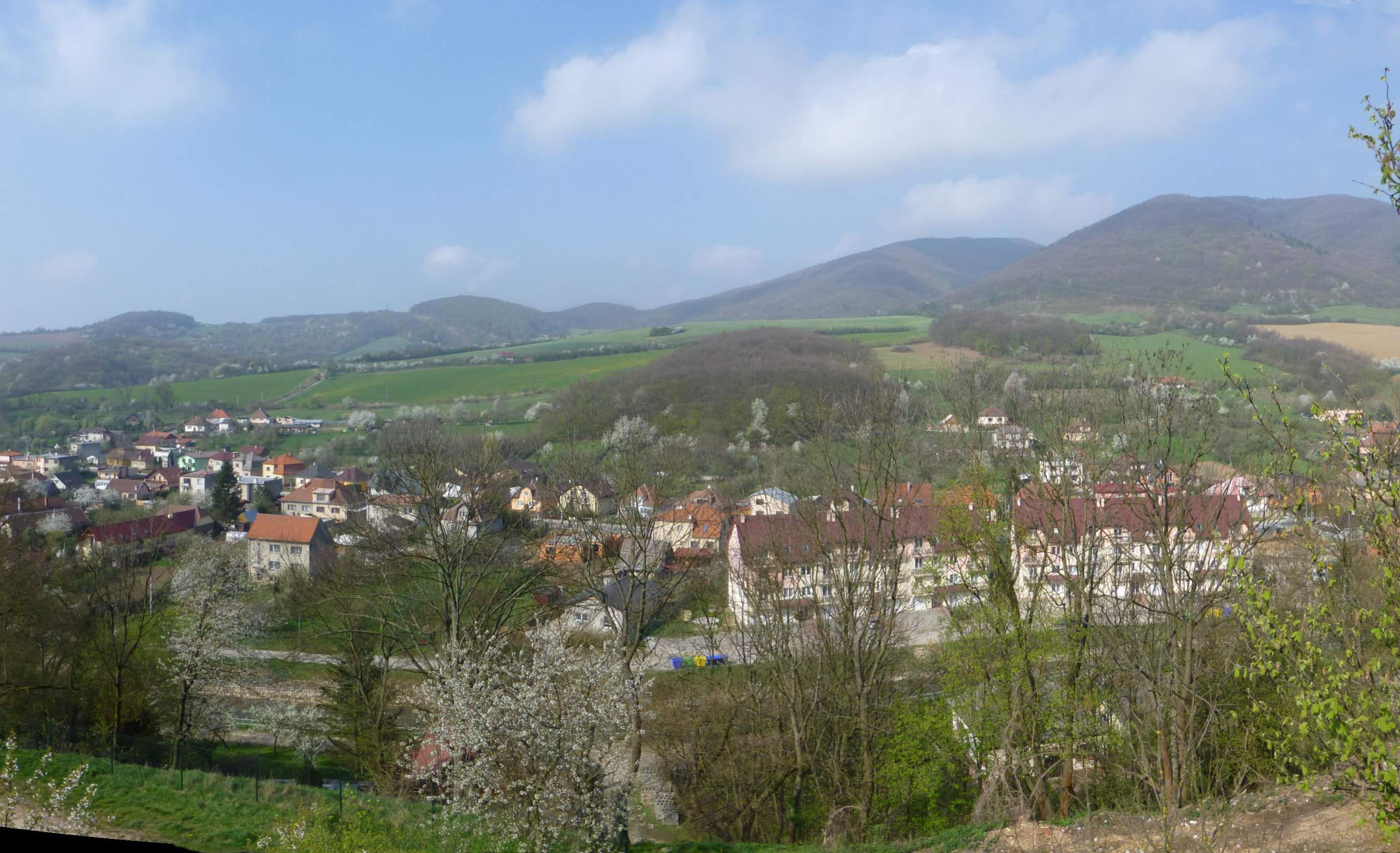

- Flag

- Location of Drietoma in the Trenčín Region Location of Drietoma in Slovakia
- Coordinates: 48.90°N 17.95°E
- Country: Slovakia
- Region: Trenčín Region
- District: Trenčín District
- First mentioned: 1321

Area
  - Total: 35.82 km^{2} (13.83 sq mi)
- Elevation: 230 m (750 ft)

Population (2025)
  - Total: 2,165
- Time zone: UTC+1 (CET)
  - Summer (DST): UTC+2 (CEST)
- Postal code: 913 03
- Area code: +421 32
- Vehicle registration plate (until 2022): TN
- Website: www.drietoma.sk

Drietoma is a village and municipality in the Trenčín District in the Trenčín Region of northwestern Slovakia.

== History ==
In historical records the village was first mentioned in 1244.

== Geography ==
The municipality lies at an altitude of 230 metres (750 ft) and covers an area of 35.82 km^{2} (13.83 sq mi) (2025).

== Population ==
Population statistic (10 years)
Year	1995	2005	2015	2025
Count	2030	2068	2243	2165
Difference		+1.87%	+8.46%	−3.47%

Population statistic
Year	2024	2025
Count	2187	2165
Difference		−1.00%

It has a population of 2165 people (31 December 2025).

=== Ethnicity ===
Census 2021 (1+ %)
Ethnicity	Number	Fraction
Slovak	2134	95.56%
Not found out	81	3.62%
Czech	29	1.29%
Total	2233	

In year 2021 was 2233 people by ethnicity 2134 as Slovak, 81 as Not found out, 29 as Czech, 7 as Other, 4 as Serbian, 4 as Russian, 3 as Rusyn, 3 as Hungarian, 1 as Vietnamese, 1 as Ukrainian, 1 as Polish, 1 as German, 1 as Moravian, 1 as Bulgarian and 1 as English.

Note on population: The difference values of population numbers in the table "Population statistic" and in the sections "Ethnicity" & "Religion" is caused by the use of various statistical methods.

=== Religion ===
Census 2021 (1+ %)
Religion	Number	Fraction
Roman Catholic Church	1499	67.13%
None	378	16.93%
Evangelical Church	204	9.14%
Not found out	89	3.99%
Total	2233	

In year 2021 was 2233 people by religion 1499 from Roman Catholic Church, 378 from None, 204 from Evangelical Church, 89 from Not found out, 10 from Seventh-day Adventist Church, 9 from Eastern Orthodox Church, 9 from Other and not ascertained christian church, 9 from Greek Catholic Church, 6 from Islam, 6 from Ad hoc movements, 5 from Christian Congregations in Slovakia, 3 from Other, 2 from Hinduism, 1 from Calvinist Church, 1 from Paganism and natural spirituality, 1 from Jehovah's Witnesses and 1 from Buddhism.

== Genealogical resources ==
The records for genealogical research are available at the state archive "Statny Archiv in Bratislava, Slovakia"

- Roman Catholic church records (births/marriages/deaths): 1714-1896 (parish A)
- Lutheran church records (births/marriages/deaths): 1783-1895 (parish B)

== See also ==
- List of municipalities and towns in Slovakia
