= Lagertha Broch =

Norwegian writer (1864–1952)

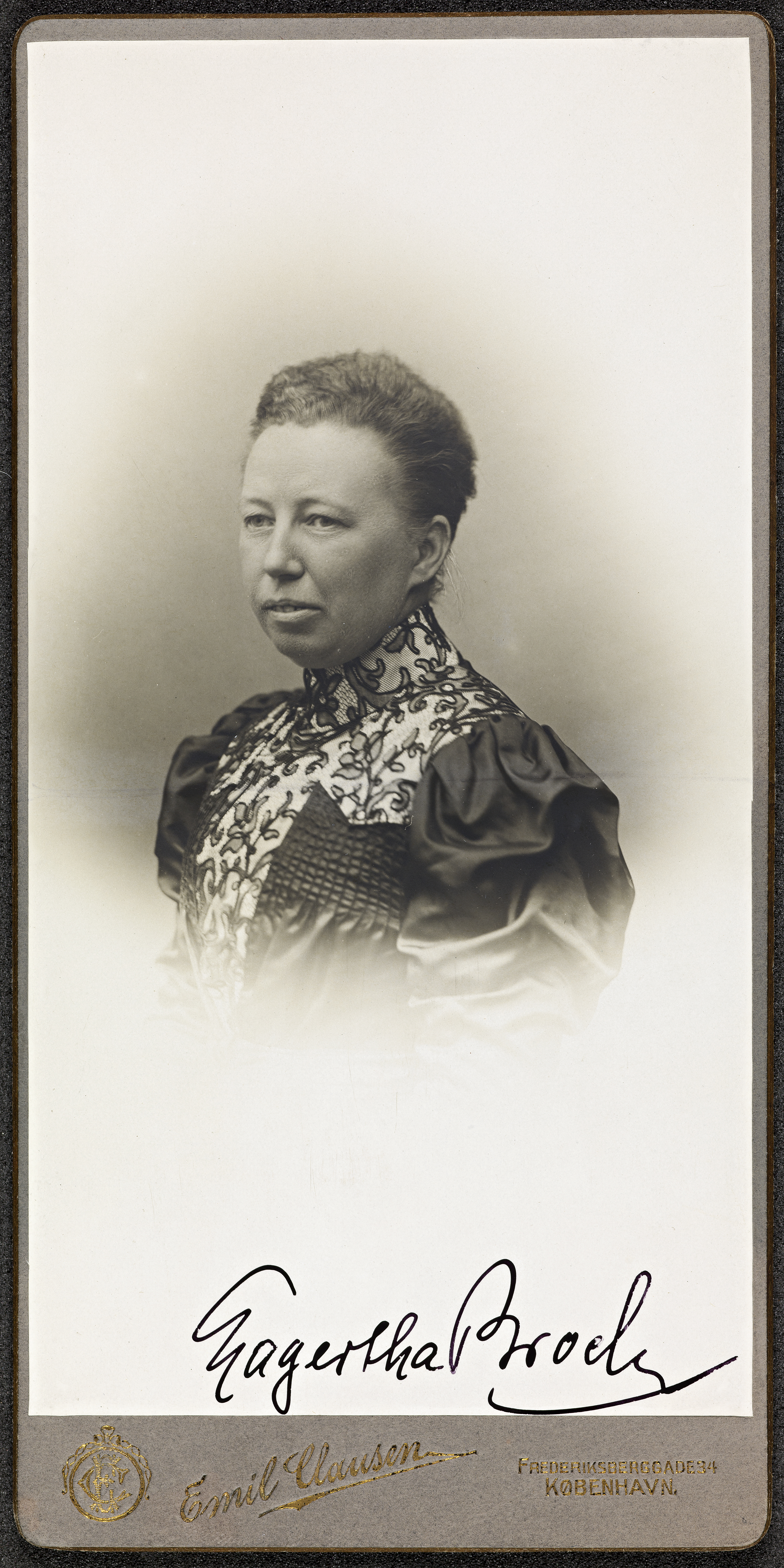
portrait of Lagertha Broch, image courtesy the National Library of Norway.

Lagertha Olea Sofie Broch (27 January 1864 – 2 May 1952) was a Norwegian illustrator, children's writer, and proponent for women's rights.

== Personal life ==
Broch was born in Horten, a daughter of merchant and brewery owner Johan Anthony Zincke Broch and his wife, Fanny Harriet Caroline Gamborg, a priest's daughter from Fredericia, Denmark. She was a sister of social worker Nanna Broch, zoologist Hjalmar Broch, and linguist Olaf Broch. She did not marry.

== Career ==
Broch worked as a teacher in Horten from 1888 to 1902, lecturing in the art of drawing. Her first children's book was published in 1902, and she wrote a total of fifteen books for children. Among her books are Den lille baadbygger from 1904, Fix og hendes venner from 1912, Havebog for barn from 1920, and Naturens eventyr from 1947. She contributed to a number of periodicals, including the women's magazines Husmoderen, Urd and Nylænde, and the children's magazines Barnets blad, Norske gutter and Børnenes jul.
