= Hjalmar Broch =

Norwegian zoologist (1882–1969)

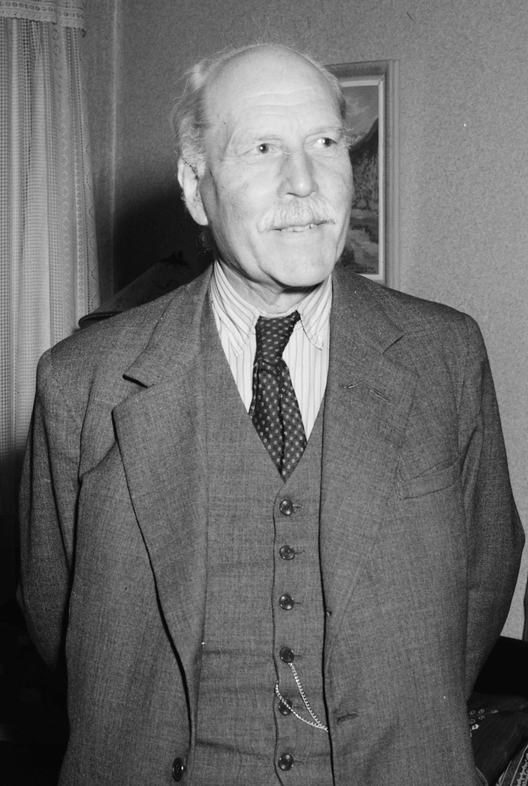
- Broch in 1952
- Born: 19 July 1882; Horten, Norway
- Died: 6 August 1969 (aged 87)
- Occupation: Zoologist
- Employer: University of Oslo
- Relatives: Lagertha Broch (1864–1952), sister; Olaf Broch (1867–1961), brother; Nanna Broch (1879–1971), sister

Hjalmar Broch (19 July 1882 – 6 August 1969) was a Norwegian zoologist and university professor at the University of Oslo (1937–1952). His specialty was biology of lesser marine animals; he published extensively on the biology of fish.

== Biography ==
Hjalmar Broch was born in 1882 at Horten, Vestfold, Norway. His father was grocer and brewery owner Johan Anthony Zinck Broch (1827–1923); his mother was Fanny Harriet Caroline Gamborg (1838–1926). An older sister, Lagertha Broch (1864–1952), became a noted children's author, and an older brother, Olaf Broch (1867–1961), became a noted linguist, specializing in Slavic languages. His younger sister Nanna Broch (1879–1971) was a noted social worker.

In 1910 Hjalmar Broch married Sofie Beyer (14 June 1882 – 27 July 1960); she was the daughter of merchant Otto Nevermann Michelsen Beyer (1853–1894) and Lina Lund Green (1857–1944).

Broch completed his primary education in 1900 and served one year in the nation's military. Beginning in 1901 he studied zoology at the University of Christiania under Kristine Bonnevie. He became the first assistant at the Swedish Hydrographic-Biologiska Kommissionen during the latter part of his study. In 1910 he received a PhD degree in zoology, at which time he was named curator of the Royal Norwegian Society of Sciences and Letters (museum) in Trondheim. He remained there until 1920, when he was named to a newly established associate professorship at the University of Christiania. In 1937 he became a full professor, a title he held until his retirement in 1952. However, he continued his scientific work at the university (which had been renamed University of Oslo in 1939) until his death in 1969.

== Career ==
Broch's primary works were on marine biology. His first studies involved herring, and he later moved into huldyrene (coelenterates) and barnacles (cirripediene). His thorough and well-written work made him an international expert on these marine animal groups. He made several contributions to the standard work Handbuch der Zoologie.

He regularly received and studied marine specimens from the Scandinavian coast, as well as from other sources around the world. In 1957 he was invited by the British Museum of Natural History to relocate to London to curate its amasses specimens. In 1931 he was invited to visit Yugoslavia to assist in the creation of the large Biolosko-Okeanografiski Institut. For his efforts he received the Yugoslav St. Sava Order, and in 1950 he was invited there again as a state guest. By 1920 Broch had been accepted as a member of the Science Academy at Trondheim, and later was included in both the Deutsche Akademie der Naturforsch Leopoldina in Halle, and the Academy of Science in Oslo.

He edited the periodical Fauna from 1953 to 1956, and Nytt magasin for zoologi from 1953 to 1955. He was also a board member of the Norwegian Ornithological Society of 1920.

Broch had many other interests and projects. He worked to improve conditions for marine life in Norway; he was chairman of the Association to promote fisheries in the Oslo Fjord in Drøbak (1932–1957). He was involved in many aspects of nature conservation, and was the first chairman of the National Association for Nature Conservation in Norway (1916–1920). He maintained a personal goal to publish at least one academic paper each year; his publication list includes about 180 works.
