= Highway M08 (Ukraine) =

Highway in Ukraine

Highway M08
- Автошлях М08
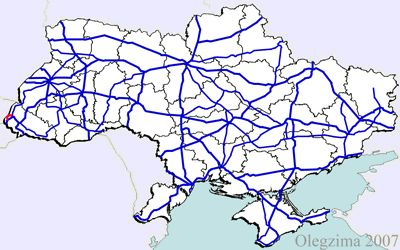

Route information
- Part of E50 E58
- Length: 13.8 km (8.6 mi)

Major junctions
- East end: M 06 in Baranyntsi
- West end: Slovakian border in Uzhhorod

Location
- Country: Ukraine
- Oblasts: Zakarpattia

Highway system
- Roads in Ukraine; State Highways

Highway M08 is the shortest Ukraine international highway. It serves as a loop route bypassing the city of Uzhhorod on the northern (mountainous) side. It is part of European routes E50 and E58.

It starts at a split of European routes E50 and E573 (village of Baranyntsi, Uzhhorod Raion) and ends at the Uzhhorod border checkpoint, which is located at vulytsia Sobranetska in Uzhhorod. Across the Slovak border, it continues as the Slovak road I/19.

== Route ==
Highway M08
Marker	Main settlements	Notes	Highway Interchanges
0 km	Uzhhorod		E50/ E573 M 06
	Uzhhorod		H 13
13 km	Uzhhorod / Border (Slovakia)		I/19 E50 (Slovakia)

== See also ==
- Roads in Ukraine
- Ukraine Highways
- International E-road network
- Pan-European corridors
- sk:Cesta I. triedy 50 (Slovensko)
