= Vilhelm Evang =

Norwegian military officer (1909–1983)

- Born: 9 November 1909; Aker, Norway
- Died: 5 January 1983 (aged 73)
- Occupation: military officer
- Known for: head of the military intelligence in Norway from 1946 to 1965
- Spouse: Lisbeth Broch
- Relatives: Karl Evang (brother)

Vilhelm Andreas Wexelsen Evang (9 November 1909 – 5 January 1983) was a Norwegian military officer. He headed the military intelligence in Norway for almost twenty years, from 1946 to 1965.

== Personal life ==
Evang was born in Aker as the son of Jens Ingolf Evang and Anna Beate Wexelsen. He grew up in Kristiania, and married Lisbeth Broch in 1938. He was a brother of civil servant Karl Evang.

== Career ==
=== Early career ===
Evang finished his examen artium in 1927, and started studying natural sciences at the University of Oslo. As a student, Evang was a member of the radical left-wing organization Mot Dag, and as such in opposition to military service. He contributed to the encyclopaedia project Arbeidernes Leksikon in the 1930s, writing articles on geography and natural science. He later became a member of the Norwegian Labour Party.

=== World War II ===
During the German attack on Norway in April 1940, Evang participated in the fighting against the German troops, and eventually had to flee to Sweden. In Sweden he came to be the head of the refugee camp in Öreryd. In 1942 he was called to London to work for the exiled Norwegian government. In London he was employed at the Norwegian Ministry of Defence, working with security.

=== Post war ===
Evang served as head of the Norwegian Intelligence Service from 1946 to 1965, first as a Major, and from 1953 with the rank of Colonel. He was responsible for developing and expanding the intelligence service during the Cold War. Evang was also a controversial person, and had conflicts both with military officers and with the head of Norwegian Police Security Service Asbjørn Bryhn. These conflicts eventually led to his resignation in 1965.
