= Vyšné Nemecké =

Vyšné Nemecké Felsőnémeti
- Municipality
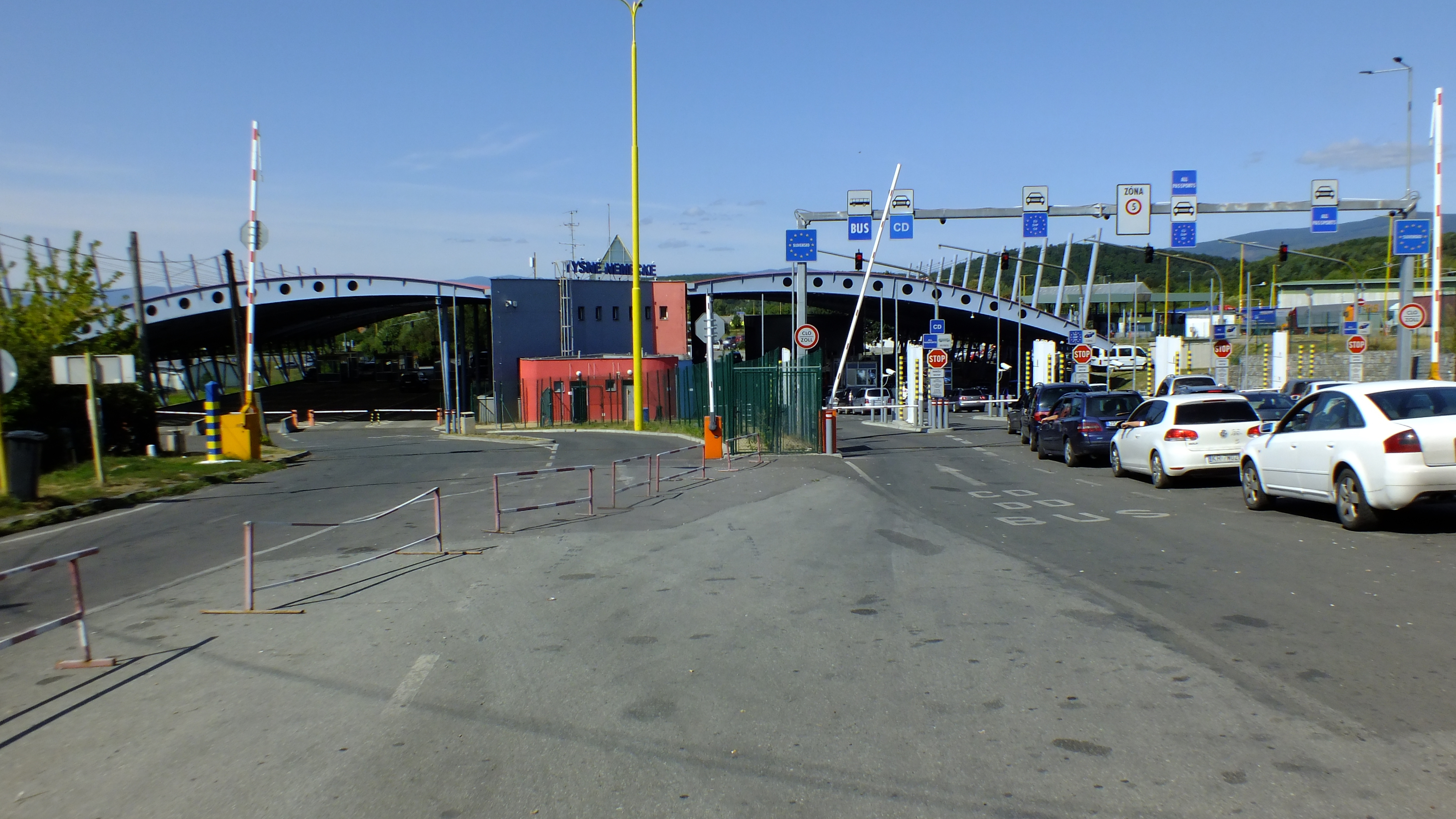
- Border Uzhhorod-Vyšné Nemecké

- Flag

- Location of Vyšné Nemecké in the Košice Region Location of Vyšné Nemecké in Slovakia
- Coordinates: 48.66°N 22.26°E
- Country: Slovakia
- Region: Košice Region
- District: Sobrance District
- First mentioned: 1372

Government
  - Mayor (Starosta): Peter Zuza

Area
  - Total: 3.76 km^{2} (1.45 sq mi)
- Elevation: 132 m (433 ft)

Population (2025)
  - Total: 246
- Time zone: UTC+1 (CET)
  - Summer (DST): UTC+2 (CEST)
- Postal code: 725 1
- Area code: +421 56
- Vehicle registration plate (until 2022): SO
- Website: www.vysnenemecke.sk

Vyšné Nemecké (Hungarian: Felsőnémeti, Ukrainian: Ви́шнє Німе́цьке) is a small village in the Sobrance District, Košice Region, right on the Slovak side of the main international road border with Ukraine, opposite the city of Uzhhorod. As of 2011 it had 245 inhabitants.

== Geography ==
The municipality lies at an altitude of 132 metres (433 ft) and covers an area of 3.76 km^{2} (1.45 sq mi) (2025).

== Population ==
Population statistic (10 years)
Year	1995	2005	2015	2025
Count	214	241	241	246
Difference		+12.61%	+0%	+2.07%

Population statistic
Year	2024	2025
Count	238	246
Difference		+3.36%

It has a population of 246 people (31 December 2025).

=== Ethnicity ===
Census 2021 (1+ %)
Ethnicity	Number	Fraction
Slovak	210	88.23%
Not found out	22	9.24%
Ukrainian	20	8.4%
Total	238	

In year 2021 was 238 people by ethnicity 210 as Slovak, 22 as Not found out, 20 as Ukrainian, 2 as Hungarian, 1 as Czech, 1 as Rusyn, 1 as Polish and 1 as Bulgarian.

Note on population: The difference values of population numbers in the table "Population statistic" and in the sections "Ethnicity" & "Religion" is caused by the use of various statistical methods.

=== Religion ===
Census 2021 (1+ %)
Religion	Number	Fraction
Greek Catholic Church	99	41.6%
Roman Catholic Church	67	28.15%
None	30	12.61%
Not found out	18	7.56%
Eastern Orthodox Church	10	4.2%
Calvinist Church	3	1.26%
Buddhism	3	1.26%
Total	238	

In year 2021 was 238 people by religion 99 from Greek Catholic Church, 67 from Roman Catholic Church, 30 from None, 18 from Not found out, 10 from Eastern Orthodox Church, 3 from Calvinist Church, 3 from Buddhism, 2 from Other and not ascertained christian church, 2 from Jehovah's Witnesses, 2 from Evangelical Church, 1 from Paganism and natural spirituality and 1 from Apostolic Church.
