= Ubľa =

- Municipality
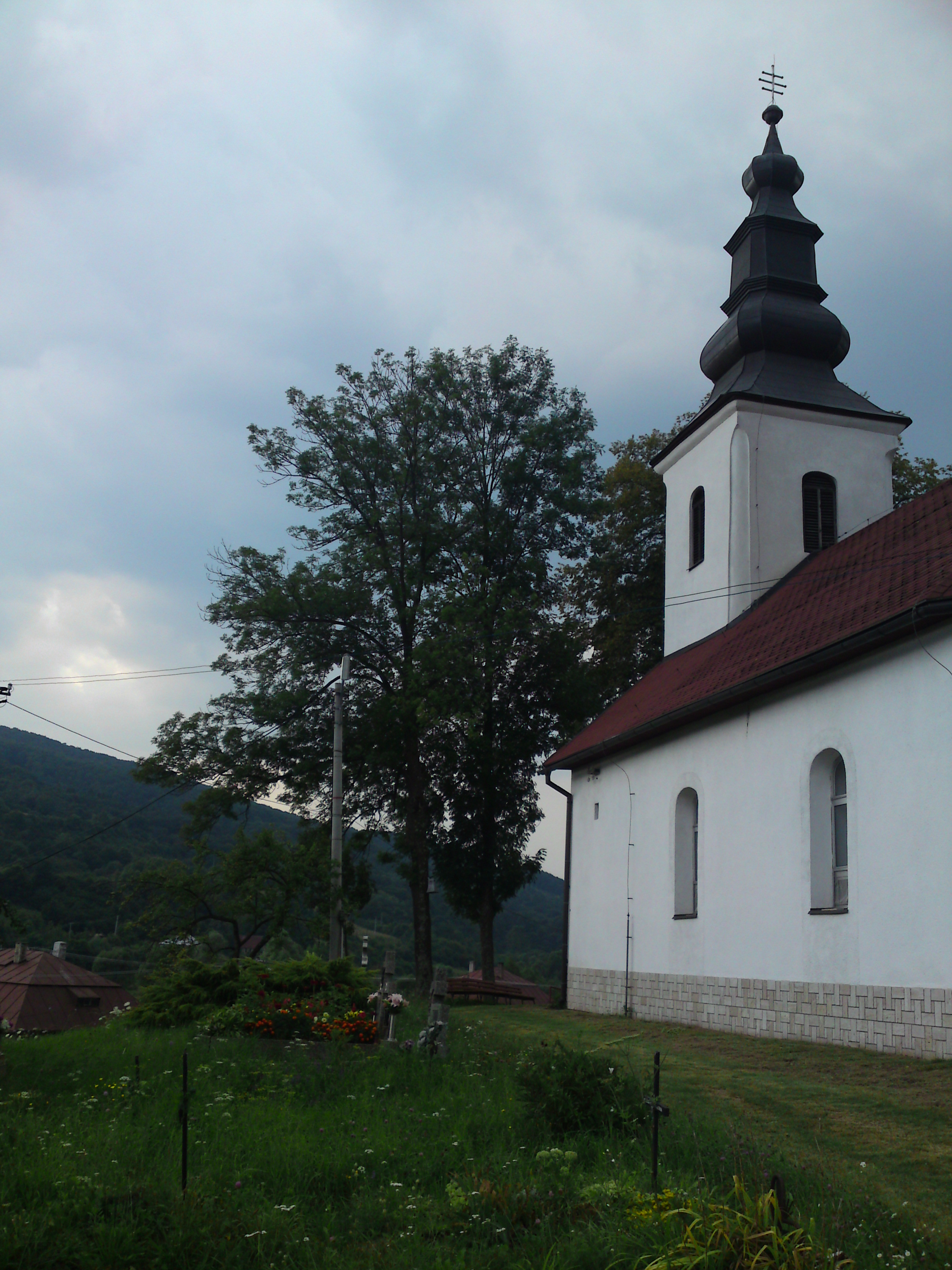

- Flag

- Location of Ubľa in the Prešov Region Location of Ubľa in Slovakia
- Coordinates: 48.88°N 22.38°E
- Country: Slovakia
- Region: Prešov Region
- District: Snina District
- First mentioned: 1567

Area
  - Total: 29.14 km^{2} (11.25 sq mi)
- Elevation: 223 m (732 ft)

Population (2025)
  - Total: 760
- Time zone: UTC+1 (CET)
  - Summer (DST): UTC+2 (CEST)
- Postal code: 677 3
- Area code: +421 57
- Vehicle registration plate (until 2022): SV
- Website: www.obecubla.sk

Ubľa (Hungarian: Ugar, Rusyn: Убля) is a border village and municipality in Snina District in the Prešov Region of north-eastern Slovakia on the border with Ukraine.

== History ==
In historical records the village was first mentioned in 1567. Before the establishment of independent Czechoslovakia in 1918, Ubľa was part of Zemplén County within the Kingdom of Hungary. In 1939, it was for a short time part of the Slovak Republic. As a result of the Slovak–Hungarian War of 1939, it was from 1939 to 1944 again part of Hungary. In the autumn of 1944, the Red Army entered Ubľa and it was once again part of Czechoslovakia.

== Geography ==
The municipality lies at an altitude of 223 metres (732 ft) and covers an area of 29.14 km^{2} (11.25 sq mi) (2025).

== Population ==
Population statistic (10 years)
Year	1995	2005	2015	2025
Count	864	873	787	760
Difference		+1.04%	−9.85%	−3.43%

Population statistic
Year	2024	2025
Count	760	760
Difference		+0%

It has a population of 760 people (31 December 2025).

=== Ethnicity ===
Census 2021 (1+ %)
Ethnicity	Number	Fraction
Slovak	577	72.85%
Rusyn	342	43.18%
Not found out	50	6.31%
Ukrainian	37	4.67%
Romani	36	4.54%
Czech	10	1.26%
Total	792	

In year 2021 was 792 people by ethnicity 577 as Slovak, 342 as Rusyn, 50 as Not found out, 37 as Ukrainian, 36 as Romani, 10 as Czech, 2 as Hungarian, 1 as Serbian, 1 as German and 1 as Other.

Note on population: The difference values of population numbers in the table "Population statistic" and in the sections "Ethnicity" & "Religion" is caused by the use of various statistical methods.

=== Religion ===
Census 2021 (1+ %)
Religion	Number	Fraction
Eastern Orthodox Church	394	49.75%
Greek Catholic Church	269	33.96%
None	47	5.93%
Not found out	41	5.18%
Roman Catholic Church	35	4.42%
Total	792	

In year 2021 was 792 people by religion 394 from Eastern Orthodox Church, 269 from Greek Catholic Church, 47 from None, 41 from Not found out, 35 from Roman Catholic Church, 2 from Christian Congregations in Slovakia, 1 from Jehovah's Witnesses, 1 from Other, 1 from Evangelical Church and 1 from Ad hoc movements.
