= Trenčianske =

Trenčianske or Trencianske may refer to:

- Trenčianske Bohuslavice, village and municipality in Nové Mesto nad Váhom District in western Slovakia
- Trenčianske Jastrabie, village and municipality in Trenčín District in north-western Slovakia
- Trenčianske Mitice, village and municipality in Trenčín District in north-western Slovakia
- Trenčianske Stankovce, village and municipality in Trenčín District in north-western Slovakia
- Trenčianske Teplice, health resort and small spa town in western Slovakia
