= Neporadza =

Neporadza may refer to several places in Slovakia.

- Neporadza, Rimavská Sobota District
- Neporadza, Trenčín District
