= Lexmann =

Lexmann is a Slovak surname. Notable people with the surname include:

- Juraj Lexmann (1941–2025), Slovak musicologist and composer
- Mikuláš Jozef Lexmann (1899–1952), Slovak priest
- Miriam Lexmann (born 1972), Slovak politician

== See also ==
- Lehmann
