= Zamarovce =

- Municipality
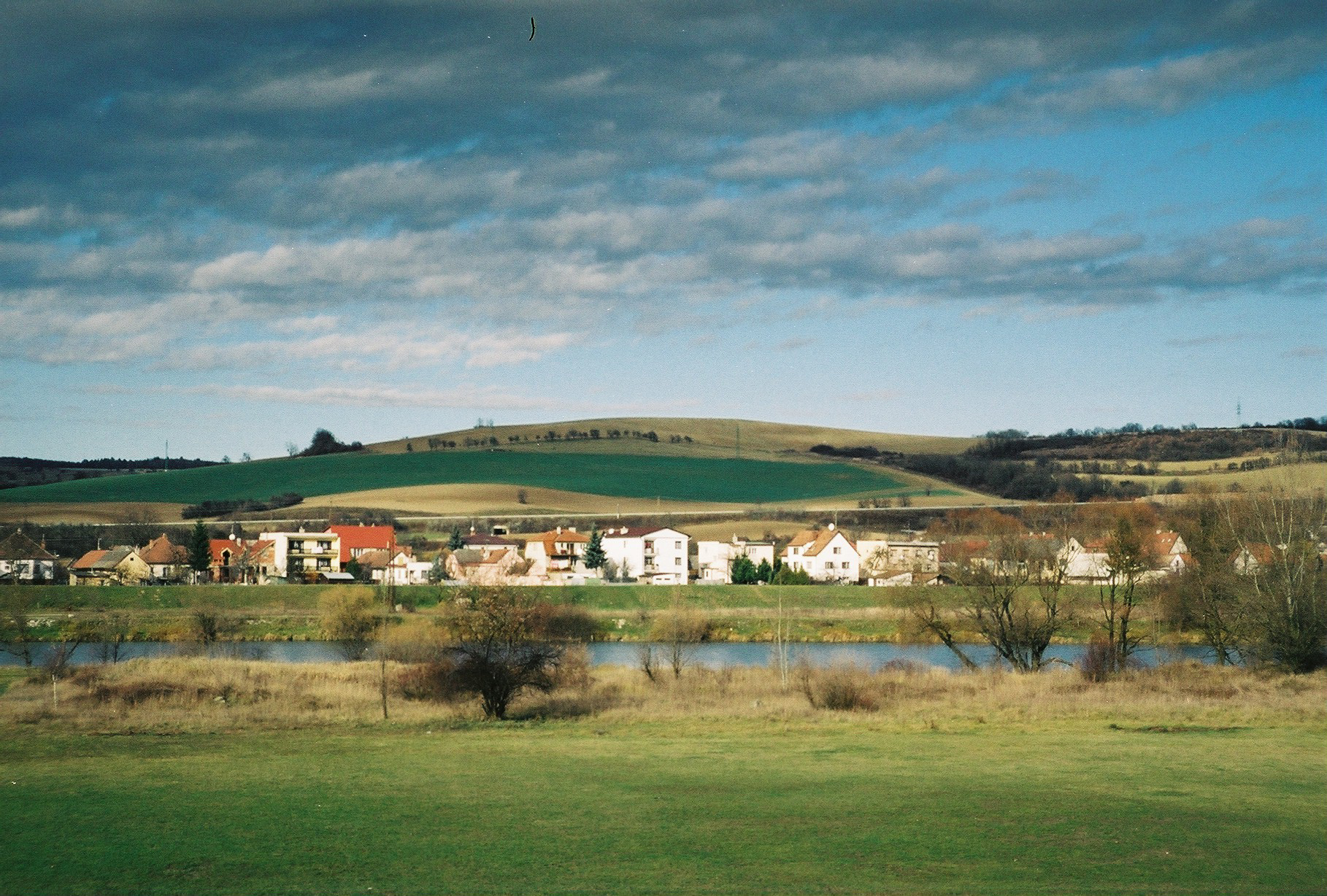

- Flag

- Location of Zamarovce in the Trenčín Region Location of Zamarovce in Slovakia
- Coordinates: 48.92°N 18.05°E
- Country: Slovakia
- Region: Trenčín Region
- District: Trenčín District
- First mentioned: 1208

Area
  - Total: 3.92 km^{2} (1.51 sq mi)
- Elevation: 216 m (709 ft)

Population (2025)
  - Total: 1,182
- Time zone: UTC+1 (CET)
  - Summer (DST): UTC+2 (CEST)
- Postal code: 911 05
- Area code: +421 32
- Vehicle registration plate (until 2022): TN
- Website: www.obeczamarovce.sk

Zamarovce (Hungarian: Vágzamárd) is a village and municipality in Trenčín District in the Trenčín Region of north-western Slovakia. It is situated mostly on the right bank of the Váh river. The municipality lies at an altitude of 215 metres and covers an area of 3.928 km^{2}.

== Geography ==
The municipality lies at an altitude of 216 metres (709 ft) and covers an area of 3.92 km^{2} (1.51 sq mi) (2025).

== Etymology ==
The name comes from Slovak Somárovce (somár - donkey).

== History ==
In historical records, the village was first mentioned in 1208 as Villa Samar. In that time, the area was property of the Zamarovsky family. In 1989, Zamarovce became an independent municipality after it was separated from Trenčín.

== Population ==
Population statistic (10 years)
| Year | 1995 | 2005 | 2015 | 2025 |
|---|---|---|---|---|
| Count | 647 | 782 | 988 | 1182 |
| Difference | | +20.86% | +26.34% | +19.63% |

Population statistic
| Year | 2024 | 2025 |
|---|---|---|
| Count | 1174 | 1182 |
| Difference | | +0.68% |

It has a population of 1182 people (31 December 2025).

=== Ethnicity ===
Census 2021 (1+ %)
| Ethnicity | Number | Fraction |
|---|---|---|
| Slovak | 1110 | 95.44% |
| Not found out | 39 | 3.35% |
| Czech | 12 | 1.03% |
| Total | 1163 | |

In year 2021 was 1163 people by ethnicity 1110 as Slovak, 39 as Not found out, 12 as Czech, 7 as Other, 6 as Russian, 1 as Irish, 1 as Italian, 1 as Rusyn, 1 as Austrian, 1 as Hungarian and 1 as Greek.

Note on population: The difference values of population numbers in the table "Population statistic" and in the sections "Ethnicity" & "Religion" is caused by the use of various statistical methods.

=== Religion ===
Census 2021 (1+ %)
| Religion | Number | Fraction |
|---|---|---|
| Roman Catholic Church | 668 | 57.44% |
| None | 369 | 31.73% |
| Evangelical Church | 47 | 4.04% |
| Not found out | 46 | 3.96% |
| Total | 1163 | |

In year 2021 was 1163 people by religion 668 from Roman Catholic Church, 369 from None, 47 from Evangelical Church, 46 from Not found out, 7 from Other and not ascertained christian church, 6 from Greek Catholic Church, 5 from Buddhism, 4 from Other, 3 from Calvinist Church, 3 from Paganism and natural spirituality, 3 from Ad hoc movements, 1 from Christian Congregations in Slovakia and 1 from Islam.

Most of the inhabitants are employed in factories in Trenčín, a local cooperative, or a brickfield plant. Notable people are pedagogue and historian Pavel Hičoldt and the doctor, traveller, and Alaska gold-digger Alexander Liska.

== Sights ==
A first half of the 19th century mansion can be found in Zamarovce. A sports center is on the left bank of the Váh.
