= Veľká Hradná =

- Municipality
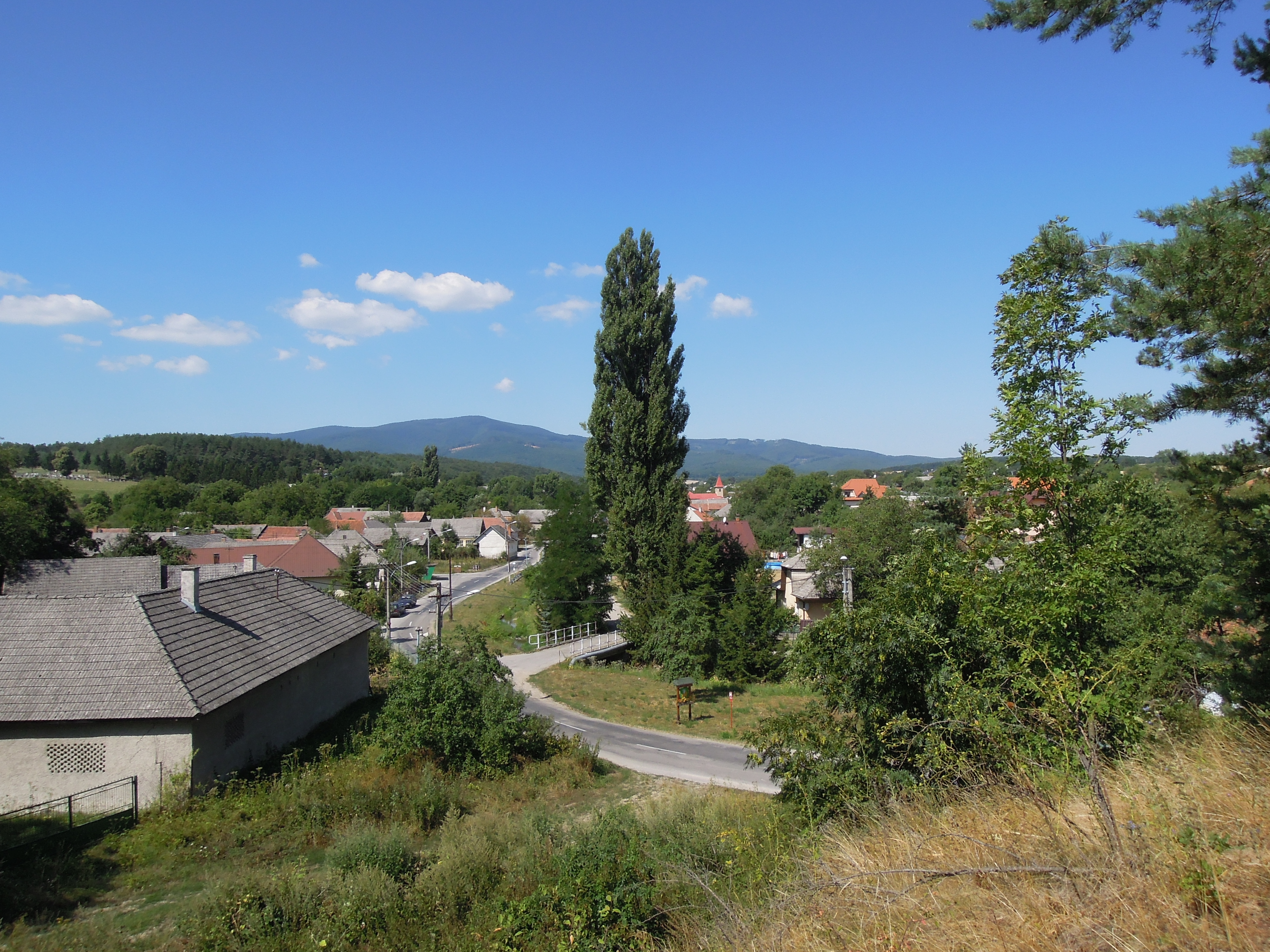

- Flag

- Location of Veľká Hradná in the Trenčín Region Location of Veľká Hradná in Slovakia
- Coordinates: 48.77°N 18.15°E
- Country: Slovakia
- Region: Trenčín Region
- District: Trenčín District
- First mentioned: 1329

Area
  - Total: 11.88 km^{2} (4.59 sq mi)
- Elevation: 270 m (890 ft)

Population (2025)
  - Total: 770
- Time zone: UTC+1 (CET)
  - Summer (DST): UTC+2 (CEST)
- Postal code: 913 24
- Area code: +421 32
- Vehicle registration plate (until 2022): TN
- Website: www.velkahradna.sk

Veľká Hradná is a village and municipality in Trenčín District in the Trenčín Region of north-western Slovakia. It lies at an altitude of 270 metres and the municipalitycovers an area of 11.881 km² with a population of about 656.

== Geography ==
The municipality lies at an altitude of 270 metres (890 ft) and covers an area of 11.88 km^{2} (4.59 sq mi) (2025).

== Population ==
Population statistic (10 years)
Year	1995	2005	2015	2025
Count	681	648	708	770
Difference		−4.84%	+9.25%	+8.75%

Population statistic
Year	2024	2025
Count	772	770
Difference		−0.25%

It has a population of 770 people (31 December 2025).

=== Ethnicity ===
Census 2021 (1+ %)
Ethnicity	Number	Fraction
Slovak	755	97.92%
Czech	8	1.03%
Total	771	

In year 2021 was 771 people by ethnicity 755 as Slovak, 8 as Czech, 6 as Not found out, 3 as Ukrainian, 1 as Russian, 1 as Austrian, 1 as Polish, 1 as Other and 1 as Bulgarian.

Note on population: The difference values of population numbers in the table "Population statistic" and in the sections "Ethnicity" & "Religion" is caused by the use of various statistical methods.

=== Religion ===
Census 2021 (1+ %)
Religion	Number	Fraction
Roman Catholic Church	646	83.79%
None	95	12.32%
Evangelical Church	13	1.69%
Total	771	

In year 2021 was 771 people by religion 646 from Roman Catholic Church, 95 from None, 13 from Evangelical Church, 6 from Not found out, 4 from Other and not ascertained christian church, 3 from Eastern Orthodox Church, 1 from Calvinist Church, 1 from Greek Catholic Church, 1 from Buddhism and 1 from Ad hoc movements.
