= Ivanovce =

- Municipality
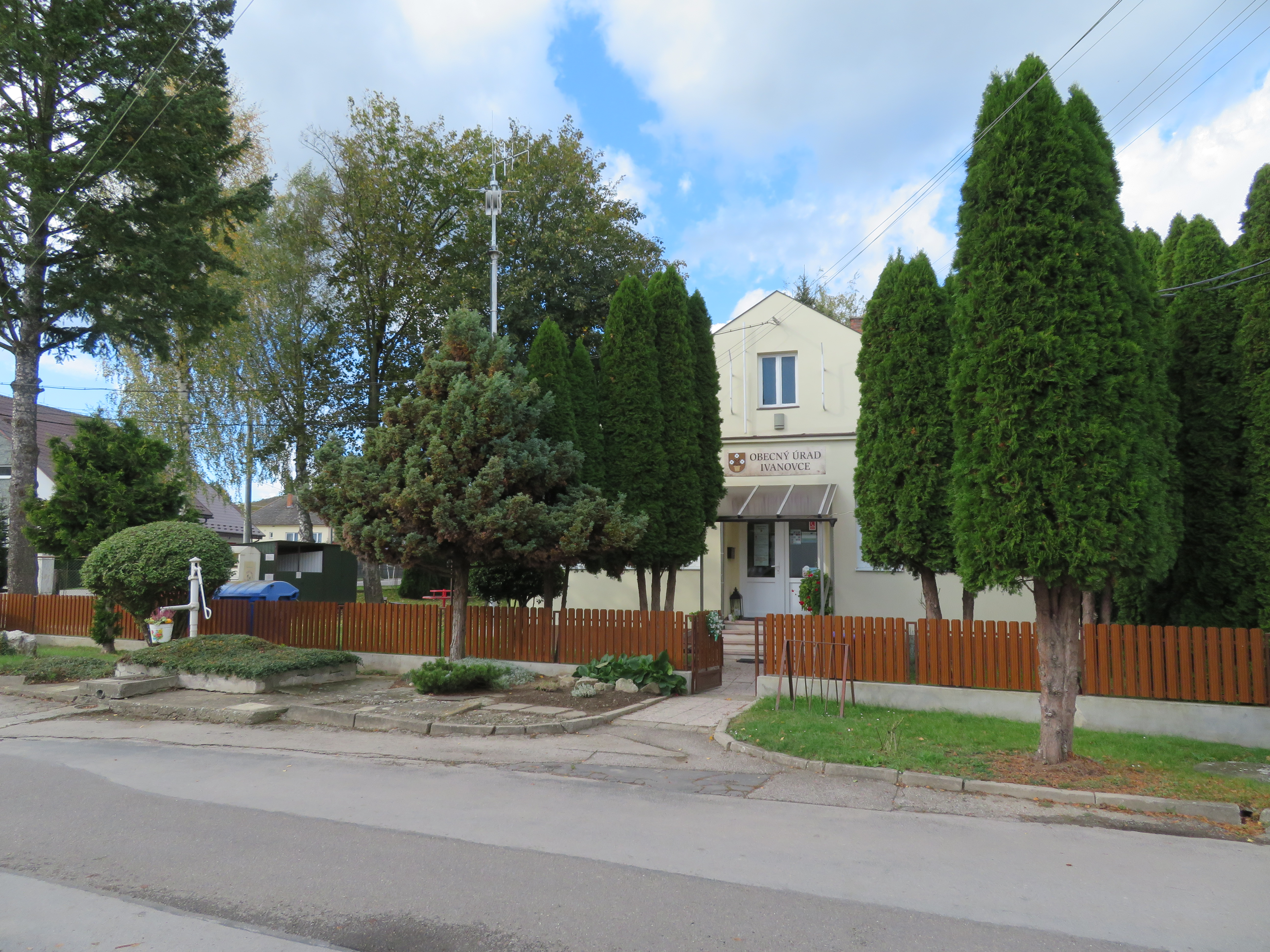

- Flag

- Location of Ivanovce in the Trenčín Region Location of Ivanovce in Slovakia
- Coordinates: 48.83°N 17.90°E
- Country: Slovakia
- Region: Trenčín Region
- District: Trenčín District
- First mentioned: 1398

Area
  - Total: 15.07 km^{2} (5.82 sq mi)
- Elevation: 197 m (646 ft)

Population (2025)
  - Total: 1,080
- Time zone: UTC+1 (CET)
  - Summer (DST): UTC+2 (CEST)
- Postal code: 913 05
- Area code: +421 32
- Vehicle registration plate (until 2022): TN
- Website: www.ivanovce.sk

Ivanovce is a village and municipality in Trenčín District in the Trenčín Region of north-western Slovakia.

== History ==
In historical records the village was first mentioned in 1398.

== Geography ==
The municipality lies at an altitude of 197 metres (646 ft) and covers an area of 15.07 km^{2} (5.82 sq mi) (2025).

== Population ==
Population statistic (10 years)
Year	1995	2005	2015	2025
Count	812	816	946	1080
Difference		+0.49%	+15.93%	+14.16%

Population statistic
Year	2024	2025
Count	1084	1080
Difference		−0.36%

It has a population of 1080 people (31 December 2025).

=== Ethnicity ===
Census 2021 (1+ %)
Ethnicity	Number	Fraction
Slovak	1000	96.89%
Not found out	24	2.32%
Czech	11	1.06%
Total	1032	

In year 2021 was 1032 people by ethnicity 1000 as Slovak, 24 as Not found out, 11 as Czech, 8 as Other, 3 as Hungarian, 2 as Italian, 1 as Jewish, 1 as Ukrainian, 1 as German and 1 as Moravian.

Note on population: The difference values of population numbers in the table "Population statistic" and in the sections "Ethnicity" & "Religion" is caused by the use of various statistical methods.

=== Religion ===
Census 2021 (1+ %)
Religion	Number	Fraction
Roman Catholic Church	503	48.74%
Evangelical Church	276	26.74%
None	214	20.74%
Not found out	28	2.71%
Total	1032	

In year 2021 was 1032 people by religion 503 from Roman Catholic Church, 276 from Evangelical Church, 214 from None, 28 from Not found out, 3 from Other, 3 from Ad hoc movements, 2 from Greek Catholic Church, 1 from Calvinist Church, 1 from Paganism and natural spirituality and 1 from Apostolic Church.

== Genealogical resources ==
The records for genealogical research are available at the state archive "Statny Archiv in Bratislava, Slovakia"

- Roman Catholic church records (births/marriages/deaths): 1714-1895 (parish B)
- Lutheran church records (births/marriages/deaths): 1784-1896 (parish B)

== See also ==
- List of municipalities and towns in Slovakia
