= Horná Súča =

- Municipality
- Flag

- Location of Horná Súča in the Trenčín Region Location of Horná Súča in Slovakia
- Coordinates: 48.97°N 17.98°E
- Country: Slovakia
- Region: Trenčín Region
- District: Trenčín District
- First mentioned: 1208

Government
  - Mayor: Juraj Ondračka

Area
  - Total: 53.82 km^{2} (20.78 sq mi)
- Elevation: 429 m (1,407 ft)

Population (2025)
  - Total: 3,274
- Time zone: UTC+1 (CET)
  - Summer (DST): UTC+2 (CEST)
- Postal code: 913 33
- Area code: +421 32
- Vehicle registration plate (until 2022): TN
- Website: www.hornasuca.sk

Horná Súča (Hungarian: Felsőszúcs) is a village and municipality in Trenčín District in the Trenčín Region of north-western Slovakia.

== History ==
In historical records the village was first mentioned in 1208.

== Geography ==
The municipality lies at an altitude of 429 metres (1,407 ft) and covers an area of 53.82 km^{2} (20.78 sq mi) (2025).

== Population ==
Population statistic (10 years)
Year	1995	2005	2015	2025
Count	3613	3473	3423	3274
Difference		−3.87%	−1.43%	−4.35%

Population statistic
Year	2024	2025
Count	3281	3274
Difference		−0.21%

It has a population of 3274 people (31 December 2025).

=== Ethnicity ===
Census 2021 (1+ %)
Ethnicity	Number	Fraction
Slovak	3165	95.88%
Not found out	121	3.66%
Total	3301	

In year 2021 was 3301 people by ethnicity 3165 as Slovak, 121 as Not found out, 29 as Czech, 9 as Hungarian, 6 as Russian, 5 as Other, 1 as Romanian, 1 as Polish and 1 as Moravian.

Note on population: The difference values of population numbers in the table "Population statistic" and in the sections "Ethnicity" & "Religion" is caused by the use of various statistical methods.

=== Religion ===
Census 2021 (1+ %)
Religion	Number	Fraction
Roman Catholic Church	2840	86.03%
None	261	7.91%
Not found out	143	4.33%
Total	3301	

In year 2021 was 3301 people by religion 2840 from Roman Catholic Church, 261 from None, 143 from Not found out, 15 from Greek Catholic Church, 12 from Evangelical Church, 7 from Eastern Orthodox Church, 6 from Christian Congregations in Slovakia, 4 from Jehovah's Witnesses, 4 from Other, 3 from Ad hoc movements, 2 from Buddhism, 1 from Calvinist Church, 1 from Paganism and natural spirituality, 1 from Other and not ascertained christian church and 1 from Bahá'i Community.

== Genealogical resources ==
The records for genealogical research are available at the state archive "Statny Archiv in Bratislava, Slovakia"

- Roman Catholic church records (births/marriages/deaths): 1688-1895 (parish A)
- Lutheran church records (births/marriages/deaths): 1783-1895 (parish B)

== See also ==
- List of municipalities and towns in Slovakia
