= Adamovské Kochanovce =

Village and municipality in Slovakia

- Municipality
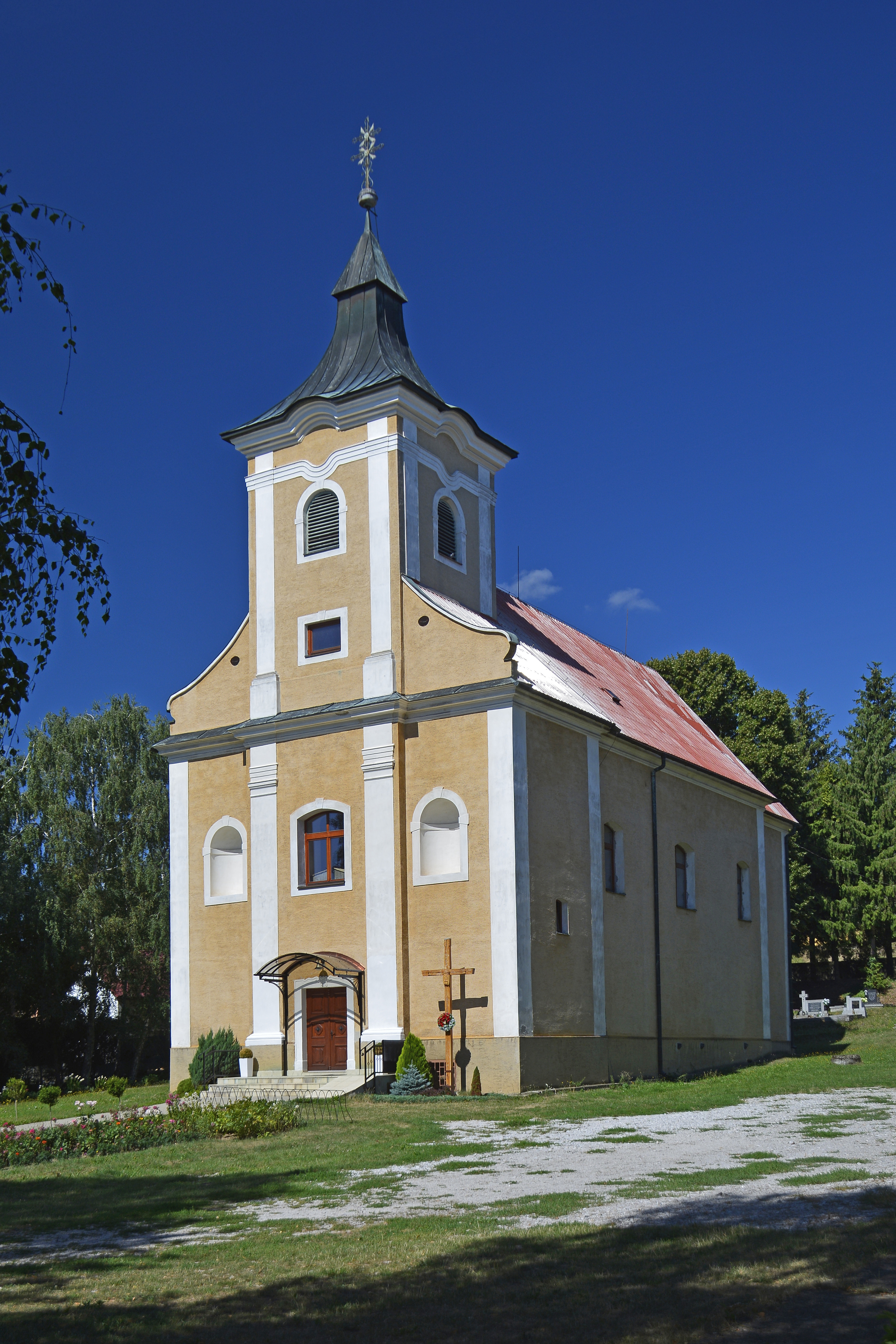

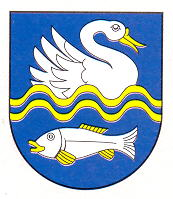
- Flag Coat of arms

- Location of Adamovské Kochanovce in the Trenčín Region Location of Adamovské Kochanovce in Slovakia
- Coordinates: 48.85°N 17.93°E
- Country: Slovakia
- Region: Trenčín Region
- District: Trenčín District
- First mentioned: 1332

Area
  - Total: 9.66 km^{2} (3.73 sq mi)
- Elevation: 201 m (659 ft)

Population (2025)
  - Total: 867
- Time zone: UTC+1 (CET)
  - Summer (DST): UTC+2 (CEST)
- Postal code: 913 05
- Area code: +421 32
- Vehicle registration plate (until 2022): TN
- Website: www.adamovskekochanovce.sk

Adamovské Kochanovce (Hungarian: Adamóckohanóc) is a village and municipality in the Trenčín District of the Trenčín Region of north-western Slovakia.

== History ==
The village was created in 1960 by the unification of Adamovce, Malé Bierovce and Kochanovce.

== Geography ==
The municipality lies at an altitude of 201 metres (659 ft) and covers an area of 9.66 km^{2} (3.73 sq mi) (2025).

== Population ==
Population statistic (10 years)
Year	1995	2005	2015	2025
Count	755	784	843	867
Difference		+3.84%	+7.52%	+2.84%

Population statistic
Year	2024	2025
Count	881	867
Difference		−1.58%

It has a population of 867 people (31 December 2025).

== Genealogical resources ==
The records for genealogical research are available at the state archive in Bratislava (Slovak: Štátny archív v Bratislave).

- Roman Catholic church records (births/marriages/deaths): 1701-1763 (parish B), 1714–1895 (parish C)
- Lutheran church records (births/marriages/deaths): 1784-1896 (parish A)
- Census records 1869 of Adamovske Kochanovce are not available at the state archive.

== See also ==
- List of municipalities and towns in Slovakia
