= Hrabovka =

Village and municipality in Slovakia

- Municipality
- Flag

- Location of Hrabovka in the Trenčín Region Location of Hrabovka in Slovakia
- Coordinates: 48.93°N 18.04°E
- Country: Slovakia
- Region: Trenčín Region
- District: Trenčín District
- First mentioned: 1423

Area
  - Total: 4.29 km^{2} (1.66 sq mi)
- Elevation: 294 m (965 ft)

Population (2025)
  - Total: 434
- Time zone: UTC+1 (CET)
  - Summer (DST): UTC+2 (CEST)
- Postal code: 913 32
- Area code: +421 32
- Vehicle registration plate (until 2022): TN
- Website: www.obec-hrabovka.sk

Hrabovka (Hungarian: Szúcsgyertyános) is a village and municipality in Trenčín District in the Trenčín Region of north-western Slovakia.

== History ==
In historical records the village was first mentioned in 1423.

== Geography ==
The municipality lies at an altitude of 294 metres (965 ft) and covers an area of 4.29 km^{2} (1.66 sq mi) (2025).

== Population ==
Population statistic (10 years)
Year	1995	2005	2015	2025
Count	411	436	427	434
Difference		+6.08%	−2.06%	+1.63%

Population statistic
Year	2024	2025
Count	439	434
Difference		−1.13%

It has a population of 434 people (31 December 2025).

=== Ethnicity ===
Census 2021 (1+ %)
Ethnicity	Number	Fraction
Slovak	420	98.36%
Not found out	5	1.17%
Total	427	

In year 2021 was 427 people by ethnicity 420 as Slovak, 5 as Not found out, 3 as Czech and 1 as Hungarian.

Note on population: The difference values of population numbers in the table "Population statistic" and in the sections "Ethnicity" & "Religion" is caused by the use of various statistical methods.

=== Religion ===
Census 2021 (1+ %)
Religion	Number	Fraction
Roman Catholic Church	343	80.33%
None	67	15.69%
Not found out	8	1.87%
Total	427	

In year 2021 was 427 people by religion 343 from Roman Catholic Church, 67 from None, 8 from Not found out, 3 from Other and not ascertained christian church, 3 from Greek Catholic Church, 2 from Evangelical Church and 1 from Other.

== Genealogical resources ==
The records for genealogical research are available at the state archive "Statny Archiv in Bratislava, Slovakia"

- Roman Catholic church records (births/marriages/deaths): 1688-1896 (parish B)
- Lutheran church records (births/marriages/deaths): 1783-1895 (parish B)

== See also ==
- List of municipalities and towns in Slovakia
