= Dolná Poruba =

Municipality of Slovakia

- Municipality
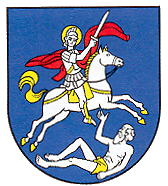
- Flag Coat of arms

- Location of Dolná Poruba in the Trenčín Region Location of Dolná Poruba in Slovakia
- Coordinates: 48.92°N 18.30°E
- Country: Slovakia
- Region: Trenčín Region
- District: Trenčín District
- First mentioned: 1355

Area
  - Total: 22.68 km^{2} (8.76 sq mi)
- Elevation: 429 m (1,407 ft)

Population (2025)
  - Total: 788
- Time zone: UTC+1 (CET)
  - Summer (DST): UTC+2 (CEST)
- Postal code: 914 44
- Area code: +421 32
- Vehicle registration plate (until 2022): TN
- Website: www.dolnaporuba.sk

Dolná Poruba (Hungarian: Bérces) is a village and municipality in Trenčín District in the Trenčín Region of north-western Slovakia.

== History ==
In historical records the village was first mentioned in 1355.

== Geography ==
The municipality lies at an altitude of 429 metres (1,407 ft) and covers an area of 22.68 km^{2} (8.76 sq mi) (2025).

== Population ==
Population statistic (10 years)
Year	1995	2005	2015	2025
Count	889	837	787	788
Difference		−5.84%	−5.97%	+0.12%

Population statistic
Year	2024	2025
Count	794	788
Difference		−0.75%

It has a population of 788 people (31 December 2025).

=== Ethnicity ===
Census 2021 (1+ %)
Ethnicity	Number	Fraction
Slovak	772	97.59%
Not found out	12	1.51%
Total	791	

In year 2021 was 791 people by ethnicity 772 as Slovak, 12 as Not found out, 7 as Czech, 3 as English, 2 as Other, 1 as Irish, 1 as Romani and 1 as Croatian.

Note on population: The difference values of population numbers in the table "Population statistic" and in the sections "Ethnicity" & "Religion" is caused by the use of various statistical methods.

=== Religion ===
Census 2021 (1+ %)
Religion	Number	Fraction
Roman Catholic Church	673	85.08%
None	81	10.24%
Not found out	18	2.28%
Total	791	

In year 2021 was 791 people by religion 673 from Roman Catholic Church, 81 from None, 18 from Not found out, 5 from Evangelical Church, 4 from Christian Congregations in Slovakia, 3 from Other and not ascertained christian church, 3 from Greek Catholic Church, 3 from Ad hoc movements and 1 from Calvinist Church.

== Genealogical resources ==
The records for genealogical research are available at the state archive "Statny Archiv in Bratislava, Slovakia"

- Roman Catholic church records (births/marriages/deaths): 1753–1895 (parish B)

== See also ==
- List of municipalities and towns in Slovakia
