= Krivosúd-Bodovka =

- Municipality
- Flag

- Location of Krivosúd-Bodovka in the Trenčín Region Location of Krivosúd-Bodovka in Slovakia
- Coordinates: 48.82°N 17.94°E
- Country: Slovakia
- Region: Trenčín Region
- District: Trenčín District
- First mentioned: 1398

Area
  - Total: 8.08 km^{2} (3.12 sq mi)
- Elevation: 213 m (699 ft)

Population (2025)
  - Total: 344
- Time zone: UTC+1 (CET)
  - Summer (DST): UTC+2 (CEST)
- Postal code: 913 11
- Area code: +421 32
- Vehicle registration plate (until 2022): TN
- Website: krivosud-bodovka.sk

Krivosúd-Bodovka (Hungarian: Bodóka) is a village and municipality in Trenčín District in the Trenčín Region of north-western Slovakia.

== History ==
In historical records the village was first mentioned in 1398.

== Geography ==
The municipality lies at an altitude of 213 metres (699 ft) and covers an area of 8.08 km^{2} (3.12 sq mi) (2025).

== Population ==
Population statistic (10 years)
Year	1995	2005	2015	2025
Count	309	309	334	344
Difference		+0%	+8.09%	+2.99%

Population statistic
Year	2024	2025
Count	346	344
Difference		−0.57%

It has a population of 344 people (31 December 2025).

=== Ethnic composition ===
Census 2021 (1+ %)
Ethnicity	Number	Fraction
Slovak	353	98.6%
Total	358	

In year 2021 was 358 people by ethnicity 353 as Slovak, 2 as Czech, 2 as Not found out, 2 as Other, 1 as Romanian and 1 as Hungarian.

Note on population: The difference values of population numbers in the table "Population statistic" and in the sections "Ethnicity" & "Religion" is caused by the use of various statistical methods.

=== Religion ===
Census 2021 (1+ %)
Religion	Number	Fraction
Evangelical Church	214	59.78%
None	67	18.72%
Roman Catholic Church	62	17.32%
Other and not ascertained christian church	5	1.4%
Ad hoc movements	5	1.4%
Total	358	

In year 2021 was 358 people by religion 214 from Evangelical Church, 67 from None, 62 from Roman Catholic Church, 5 from Other and not ascertained christian church, 5 from Ad hoc movements, 2 from Jehovah's Witnesses, 2 from Not found out and 1 from Hinduism.
