= Melčice-Lieskové =

- Municipality
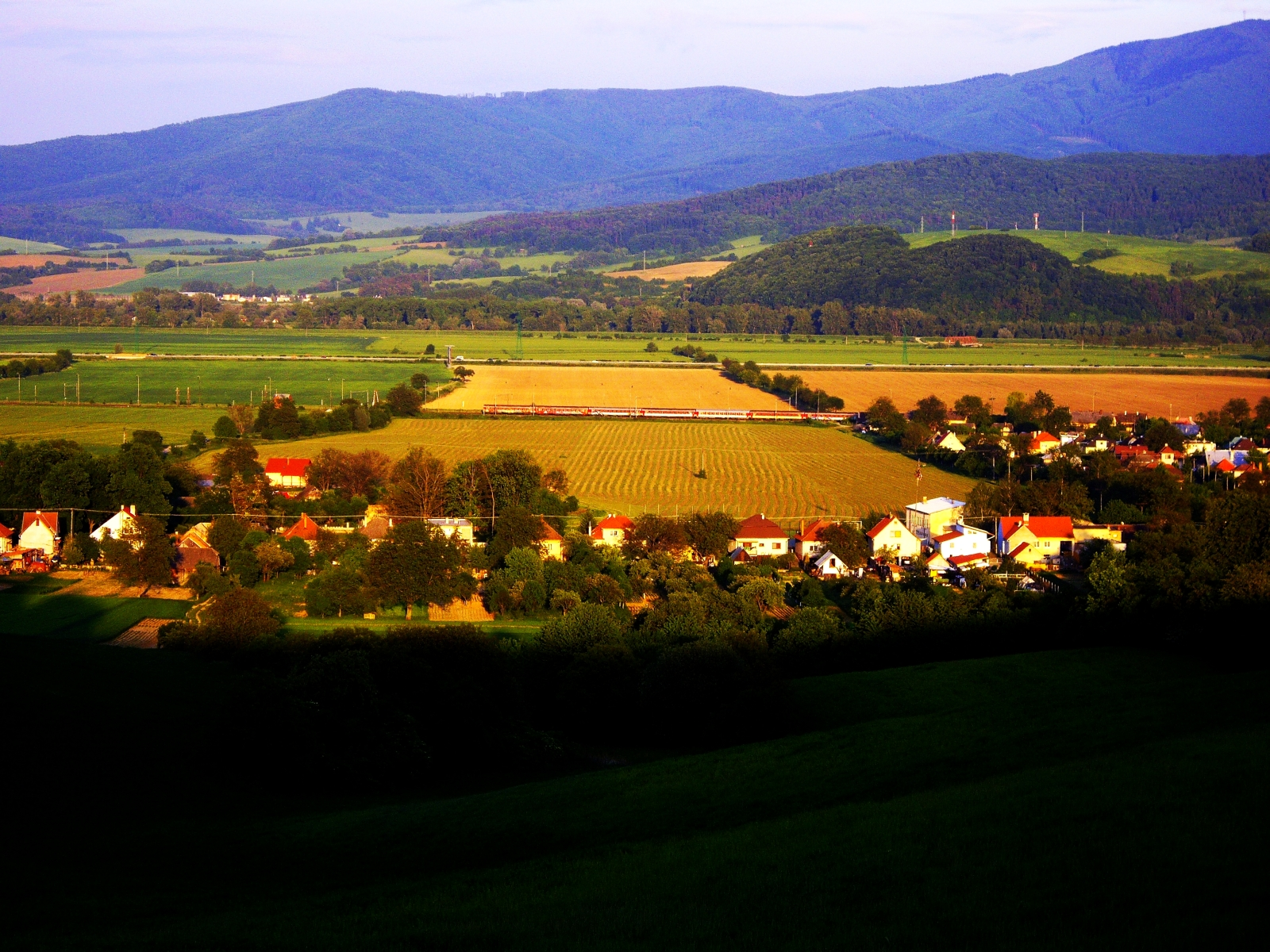

- Flag

- Location of Melčice-Lieskové in the Trenčín Region Location of Melčice-Lieskové in Slovakia
- Coordinates: 48.84°N 17.92°E
- Country: Slovakia
- Region: Trenčín Region
- District: Trenčín District
- First mentioned: 1398

Area
  - Total: 21.57 km^{2} (8.33 sq mi)
- Elevation: 204 m (669 ft)

Population (2025)
  - Total: 1,730
- Time zone: UTC+1 (CET)
  - Summer (DST): UTC+2 (CEST)
- Postal code: 913 05
- Area code: +421 32
- Vehicle registration plate (until 2022): TN
- Website: www.melcice-lieskove.sk

Melčice-Lieskové (Hungarian: Melcsicmogyoród) is a village and municipality in Trenčín District in the Trenčín Region of north-western Slovakia.

== History ==
In historical records the village was first mentioned in 1398.

== Geography ==
The municipality lies at an altitude of 204 metres (669 ft) and covers an area of 21.57 km^{2} (8.33 sq mi) (2025).

== Population ==
Population statistic (10 years)
Year	1995	2005	2015	2025
Count	1528	1549	1629	1730
Difference		+1.37%	+5.16%	+6.20%

Population statistic
Year	2024	2025
Count	1713	1730
Difference		+0.99%

It has a population of 1730 people (31 December 2025).

=== Ethnicity ===
Census 2021 (1+ %)
Ethnicity	Number	Fraction
Slovak	1594	96.54%
Not found out	34	2.05%
Czech	26	1.57%
Total	1651	

In year 2021 was 1651 people by ethnicity 1594 as Slovak, 34 as Not found out, 26 as Czech, 6 as Italian, 4 as Russian, 4 as Other, 3 as Polish, 3 as German, 3 as Moravian, 3 as Hungarian, 1 as Ukrainian, 1 as Silesian, 1 as Rusyn, 1 as Romanian and 1 as Croatian.

Note on population: The difference values of population numbers in the table "Population statistic" and in the sections "Ethnicity" & "Religion" is caused by the use of various statistical methods.

=== Religion ===
Census 2021 (1+ %)
Religion	Number	Fraction
Roman Catholic Church	835	50.58%
Evangelical Church	440	26.65%
None	301	18.23%
Not found out	25	1.51%
Total	1651	

In year 2021 was 1651 people by religion 835 from Roman Catholic Church, 440 from Evangelical Church, 301 from None, 25 from Not found out, 12 from Greek Catholic Church, 8 from Apostolic Church, 5 from Christian Congregations in Slovakia, 4 from Eastern Orthodox Church, 4 from Other, 4 from Church of the Brethren, 3 from Other and not ascertained christian church, 2 from Seventh-day Adventist Church, 1 from Jewish community, 1 from Calvinist Church, 1 from Paganism and natural spirituality, 1 from Jehovah's Witnesses, 1 from United Methodist Church, 1 from Church of Jesus Christ of Latter-day Saints, 1 from Buddhism and 1 from Ad hoc movements.
