= Kostolná-Záriečie =

- Municipality
- Flag

- Location of Kostolná-Záriečie in the Trenčín Region Location of Kostolná-Záriečie in Slovakia
- Coordinates: 48.88°N 17.97°E
- Country: Slovakia
- Region: Trenčín Region
- District: Trenčín District
- First mentioned: 1318

Area
  - Total: 3.66 km^{2} (1.41 sq mi)
- Elevation: 211 m (692 ft)

Population (2025)
  - Total: 668
- Time zone: UTC+1 (CET)
  - Summer (DST): UTC+2 (CEST)
- Postal code: 913 04
- Area code: +421 32
- Vehicle registration plate (until 2022): TN
- Website: www.kostolna-zariecie.sk

Kostolná-Záriečie (Hungarian: Vágegyháza-Alsózáros) is a village and municipality in Trenčín District in the Trenčín Region of north-western Slovakia.

== History ==
In historical records the village was first mentioned in 1318.

== Geography ==
The municipality lies at an altitude of 211 metres (692 ft) and covers an area of 3.66 km^{2} (1.41 sq mi) (2025).

== Population ==
Population statistic (10 years)
Year	1995	2005	2015	2025
Count	645	668	663	668
Difference		+3.56%	−0.74%	+0.75%

Population statistic
Year	2024	2025
Count	671	668
Difference		−0.44%

It has a population of 668 people (31 December 2025).

=== Ethnicity ===
Census 2021 (1+ %)
Ethnicity	Number	Fraction
Slovak	681	98.55%
Czech	7	1.01%
Total	691	

In year 2021 was 691 people by ethnicity 681 as Slovak, 7 as Czech, 6 as Not found out, 1 as Russian, 1 as Moravian, 1 as Hungarian and 1 as Other.

Note on population: The difference values of population numbers in the table "Population statistic" and in the sections "Ethnicity" & "Religion" is caused by the use of various statistical methods.

=== Religion ===
Census 2021 (1+ %)
Religion	Number	Fraction
Roman Catholic Church	495	71.64%
None	118	17.08%
Evangelical Church	54	7.81%
Greek Catholic Church	10	1.45%
Not found out	9	1.3%
Total	691	

In year 2021 was 691 people by religion 495 from Roman Catholic Church, 118 from None, 54 from Evangelical Church, 10 from Greek Catholic Church, 9 from Not found out, 4 from Other and 1 from Eastern Orthodox Church.

== Genealogical resources ==
The records for genealogical research are available at the state archive "Statny Archiv in Bratislava, Slovakia"

- Roman Catholic church records (births/marriages/deaths): 1714-1896 (parish B)
- Lutheran church records (births/marriages/deaths): 1783-1895 (parish B)

== See also ==
- List of municipalities and towns in Slovakia
