= Horňany =

Municipality of Slovakia

- Municipality
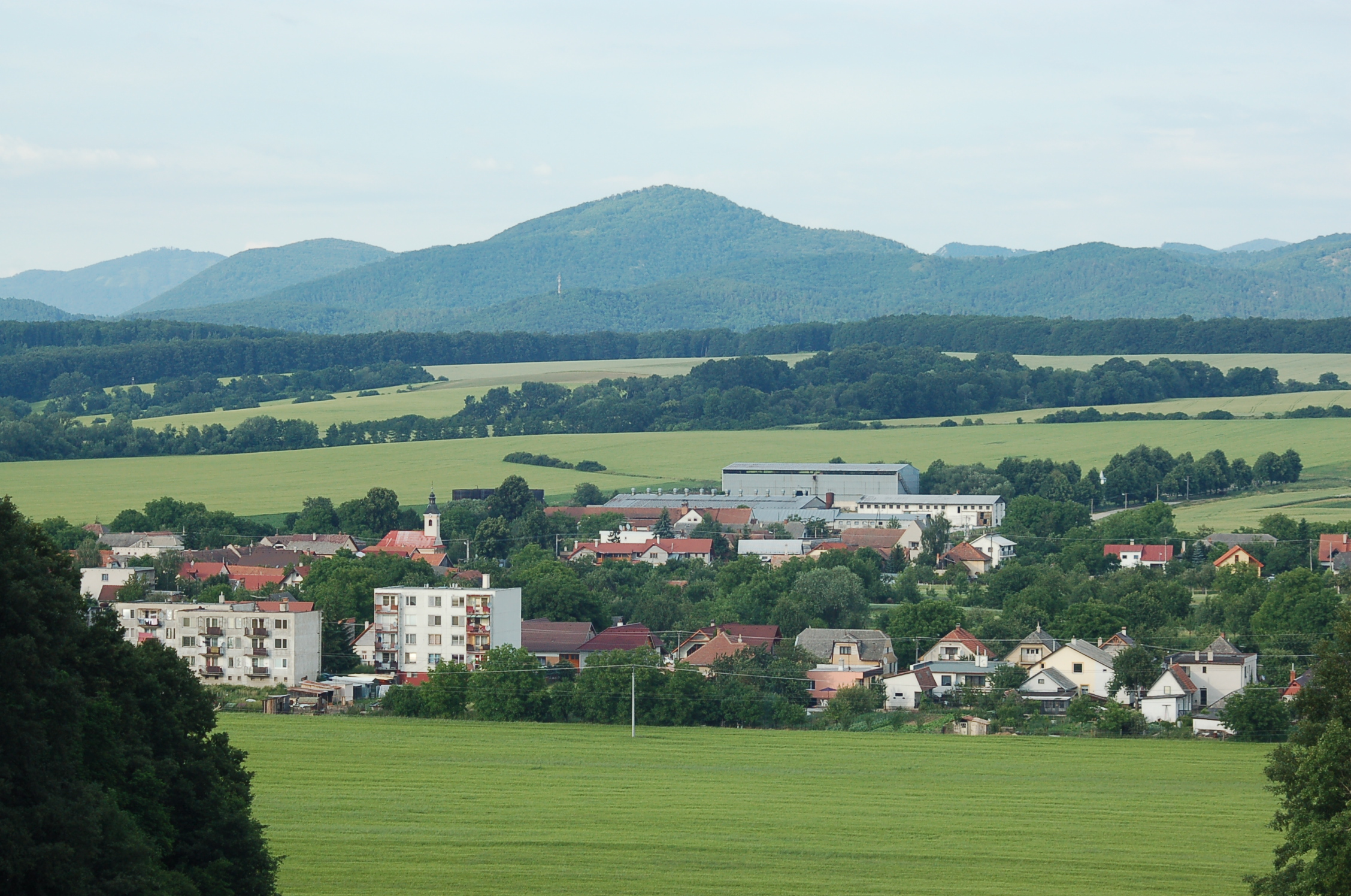

- Flag

- Location of Horňany in the Trenčín Region Location of Horňany in Slovakia
- Coordinates: 48.78°N 18.20°E
- Country: Slovakia
- Region: Trenčín Region
- District: Trenčín District
- First mentioned: 1352

Area
  - Total: 6.70 km^{2} (2.59 sq mi)
- Elevation: 222 m (728 ft)

Population (2025)
  - Total: 423
- Time zone: UTC+1 (CET)
  - Summer (DST): UTC+2 (CEST)
- Postal code: 913 24
- Area code: +421 32
- Vehicle registration plate (until 2022): TN
- Website: hornany.sk

Horňany (Hungarian: Hornyán) is a village and municipality in Trenčín District in the Trenčín Region of north-western Slovakia.

== History ==
In historical records the village was first mentioned in 1352.

== Geography ==
The municipality lies at an altitude of 222 metres (728 ft) and covers an area of 6.70 km^{2} (2.59 sq mi) (2025).

== Population ==
Population statistic (10 years)
Year	1995	2005	2015	2025
Count	376	396	462	423
Difference		+5.31%	+16.66%	−8.44%

Population statistic
Year	2024	2025
Count	427	423
Difference		−0.93%

It has a population of 423 people (31 December 2025).

=== Ethnicity ===
Census 2021 (1+ %)
Ethnicity	Number	Fraction
Slovak	414	96.5%
Not found out	13	3.03%
Czech	5	1.16%
Total	429	

In year 2021 was 429 people by ethnicity 414 as Slovak, 13 as Not found out, 5 as Czech, 4 as Vietnamese, 2 as Other, 1 as Rusyn and 1 as Hungarian.

Note on population: The difference values of population numbers in the table "Population statistic" and in the sections "Ethnicity" & "Religion" is caused by the use of various statistical methods.

=== Religion ===
Census 2021 (1+ %)
Religion	Number	Fraction
Roman Catholic Church	332	77.39%
None	63	14.69%
Not found out	14	3.26%
Evangelical Church	9	2.1%
Total	429	

In year 2021 was 429 people by religion 332 from Roman Catholic Church, 63 from None, 14 from Not found out, 9 from Evangelical Church, 3 from Greek Catholic Church, 3 from Ad hoc movements, 2 from Buddhism, 1 from Calvinist Church, 1 from Eastern Orthodox Church and 1 from Christian Congregations in Slovakia.

== Genealogical resources ==
The records for genealogical research are available at the state archive "Statny Archiv in Bratislava, Nitra, Slovakia"

- Roman Catholic church records (births/marriages/deaths): 1725-1898 (parish B)

== See also ==
- List of municipalities and towns in Slovakia
