= Trenčín District =

Coordinates: 48°54′N 18°02′E

- District
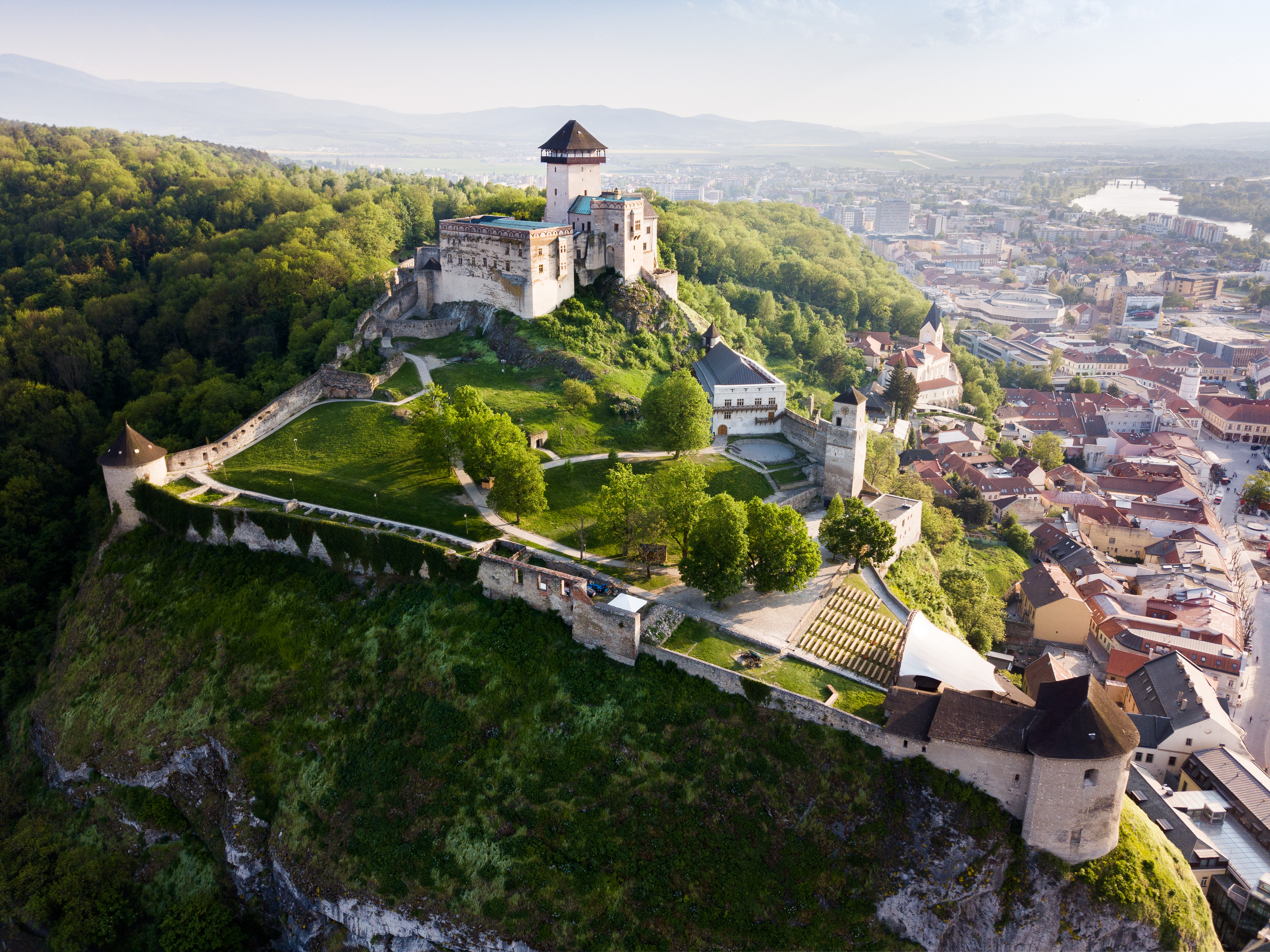
- Country: Slovakia
- Region (kraj): Trenčín Region
- Seat: Trenčín

Area
  - Total: 674.81 km^{2} (260.55 sq mi)

Population (2025)
  - Total: 113,057
- Time zone: UTC+1 (CET)
  - Summer (DST): UTC+2 (CEST)
- Telephone prefix: 32
- Vehicle registration plate (until 2022): TN
- Municipalities: 37

Trenčín District (Slovak: okres Trenčín, Hungarian: Trencséni járás) is a district in the Trenčín Region of northwestern Slovakia. It borders the districts of Bánovce nad Bebravou, Nové Mesto nad Váhom, and Ilava. In the northwest, the Slovak state border also forms the border of the Trenčín district.

== History ==
Until 1918, the district was part of the county of Kingdom of Hungary of Trencsén.

== Geography ==
The central part of the district, the Trenčianska kotlina basin and a part of the Ilavská kotlina basin are skirted by the White Carpathians to the west and the Strážov Mountains and the Považský Inovec in the east.

== Economy ==
The most important industries are engineering and electrical engineering. In the past also the textile and clothing industries were of importance. In the Trenčianske Teplice spa locomotive and nervous system diseases are treated.

== Population ==
Historical population
Year	Pop.	±%
1970	96,063	—
1980	106,776	+11.2%
1991	111,366	+4.3%
2001	112,767	+1.3%
2011	113,115	+0.3%
2021	113,777	+0.6%
Source: Censuses

Population statistic (10 years)
Year	1995	2005	2015	2025
Count	113,563	112,761	113,945	113,057
Difference		−0.70%	+1.05%	−0.77%

Population statistic
Year	2024	2025
Count	113,208	113,057
Difference		−0.13%

It has a population of 113,057 people (31 December 2025).

=== Ethnicity ===
Census 2021 (1+ %)
Ethnicity	Number	Fraction
Slovak	107,863	93.07%
Not found out	4635	3.99%
Czech	1640	1.41%
Total	115,892	

In year 2021 was 115,892 people by ethnicity 107,863 as Slovak, 4635 as Not found out, 1640 as Czech, 398 as Other, 230 as Hungarian, 172 as Russian, 108 as Rusyn, 102 as German, 94 as Moravian, 93 as Romani, 90 as Ukrainian, 76 as Polish, 69 as Italian, 40 as English, 32 as Serbian, 28 as Irish, 26 as French, 24 as Jewish, 23 as Austrian, 22 as Vietnamese, 22 as Croatian, 21 as Canadian, 20 as Bulgarian, 19 as Greek, 12 as Romanian, 8 as Chinese, 8 as Albanian, 7 as Silesian, 5 as Turkish, 3 as Korean and 2 as Iranian.

Note on population: The difference values of population numbers in the table "Population statistic" and in the sections "Ethnicity" & "Religion" is caused by the use of various statistical methods.

=== Religion ===
Census 2021 (1+ %)
Religion	Number	Fraction
Roman Catholic Church	69,302	60.91%
None	29,368	25.81%
Evangelical Church	6386	5.61%
Not found out	5572	4.9%
Total	113,777	

In year 2021 was 113,777 people by religion 69,302 from Roman Catholic Church, 29,368 from None, 6386 from Evangelical Church, 5572 from Not found out, 720 from Greek Catholic Church, 428 from Ad hoc movements, 351 from Other, 294 from Christian Congregations in Slovakia, 208 from Eastern Orthodox Church, 200 from Other and not ascertained christian church, 190 from Buddhism, 112 from Islam, 105 from Jehovah's Witnesses, 90 from Paganism and natural spirituality, 88 from Apostolic Church, 84 from Calvinist Church, 84 from Seventh-day Adventist Church, 48 from Church of the Brethren, 32 from Jewish community, 30 from United Methodist Church, 22 from Old Catholic Church, 17 from Hinduism, 17 from Czechoslovak Hussite Church, 12 from Bahá'i Community, 8 from Church of Jesus Christ of Latter-day Saints, 8 from Baptists Church and 1 from New Apostolic Church.

== Municipalities ==
The district consists of 3 towns and 34 municipalities. The district seat is Trenčín, which is also the oldest (founded in 1111) and most populous town of the district with 55,698 inhabitants in 2015. The smallest municipality is Petrova Lehota with 183 inhabitants. The youngest municipality is Štvrtok, which was founded in 1477. The municipalities with the lowest elevation are Ivanovce and Štvrtok, at an elevation of 197 metres (646 ft) above sea level. The highest municipality is Dolná Poruba at 427 metres (1,401 ft) above sea level.

Municipality	Area [km^{2}]	Population
Adamovské Kochanovce	9.66	867
Bobot	16.07	739
Dolná Poruba	22.68	788
Dolná Súča	26.31	3,024
Drietoma	35.82	2,165
Dubodiel	20.19	1,042
Horňany	6.70	423
Horná Súča	53.82	3,274
Horné Srnie	27.06	2,648
Hrabovka	4.29	434
Chocholná-Velčice	27.89	1,648
Ivanovce	15.07	1,080
Kostolná-Záriečie	3.66	668
Krivosúd-Bodovka	8.08	344
Melčice-Lieskové	21.57	1,730
Mníchova Lehota	16.61	1,230
Motešice	17.39	781
Nemšová	33.44	6,132
Neporadza	14.21	791
Omšenie	18.57	1,809
Opatovce	2.89	425
Petrova Lehota	8.06	187
Selec	24.80	1,010
Skalka nad Váhom	8.68	1,318
Soblahov	17.38	2,391
Svinná	8.60	1,601
Štvrtok	4.08	481
Trenčianska Teplá	15.13	4,131
Trenčianska Turná	17.46	3,519
Trenčianske Jastrabie	12.25	1,416
Trenčianske Mitice	12.83	867
Trenčianske Stankovce	24.49	3,402
Trenčianske Teplice	16.23	3,925
Trenčín	81.99	54,104
Veľká Hradná	11.88	770
Veľké Bierovce	4.68	711
Zamarovce	3.92	1,182

Population and area values are current for year 2025.
