= Veľké Bierovce =

- Municipality
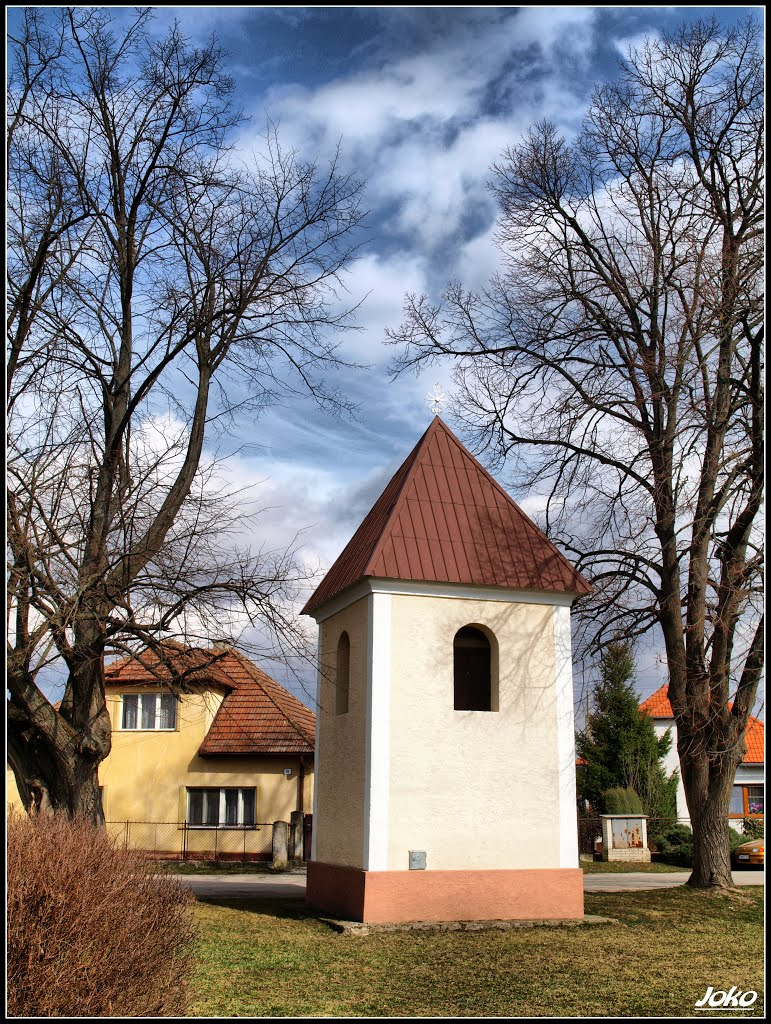

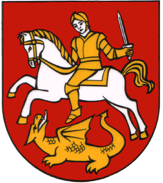
- Flag Coat of arms

- Location of Veľké Bierovce in the Trenčín Region Location of Veľké Bierovce in Slovakia
- Coordinates: 48.85°N 17.98°E
- Country: Slovakia
- Region: Trenčín Region
- District: Trenčín District
- First mentioned: 1332

Area
  - Total: 4.68 km^{2} (1.81 sq mi)
- Elevation: 200 m (660 ft)

Population (2025)
  - Total: 711
- Time zone: UTC+1 (CET)
  - Summer (DST): UTC+2 (CEST)
- Postal code: 913 11
- Area code: +421 32
- Vehicle registration plate (until 2022): TN
- Website: www.velkebierovce.sk

Veľké Bierovce (Hungarian: Nagybiróc) is a village and municipality in Trenčín District in the Trenčín Region of northwestern Slovakia.

== History ==
In historical records the village was first mentioned in 1332.

== Geography ==
The municipality lies at an altitude of 200 metres (660 ft) and covers an area of 4.68 km^{2} (1.81 sq mi) (2025).

== Population ==
Population statistic (10 years)
Year	1995	2005	2015	2025
Count	593	603	673	711
Difference		+1.68%	+11.60%	+5.64%

Population statistic
Year	2024	2025
Count	701	711
Difference		+1.42%

It has a population of 711 people (31 December 2025).

=== Ethnicity ===
Census 2021 (1+ %)
Ethnicity	Number	Fraction
Slovak	699	98.72%
Total	708	

In year 2021 was 708 people by ethnicity 699 as Slovak, 5 as Not found out, 4 as Other, 2 as Romani, 1 as Czech, 1 as Ukrainian, 1 as Rusyn and 1 as German.

Note on population: The difference values of population numbers in the table "Population statistic" and in the sections "Ethnicity" & "Religion" is caused by the use of various statistical methods.

=== Religion ===
Census 2021 (1+ %)
Religion	Number	Fraction
Roman Catholic Church	525	74.15%
None	85	12.01%
Evangelical Church	72	10.17%
Not found out	9	1.27%
Total	708	

In year 2021 was 708 people by religion 525 from Roman Catholic Church, 85 from None, 72 from Evangelical Church, 9 from Not found out, 5 from Christian Congregations in Slovakia, 5 from Greek Catholic Church, 2 from Other and not ascertained christian church, 1 from Calvinist Church, 1 from Eastern Orthodox Church, 1 from Buddhism, 1 from Apostolic Church and 1 from Ad hoc movements.
