= Selec =

Village in Trenčín region of Slovakia

- Municipality
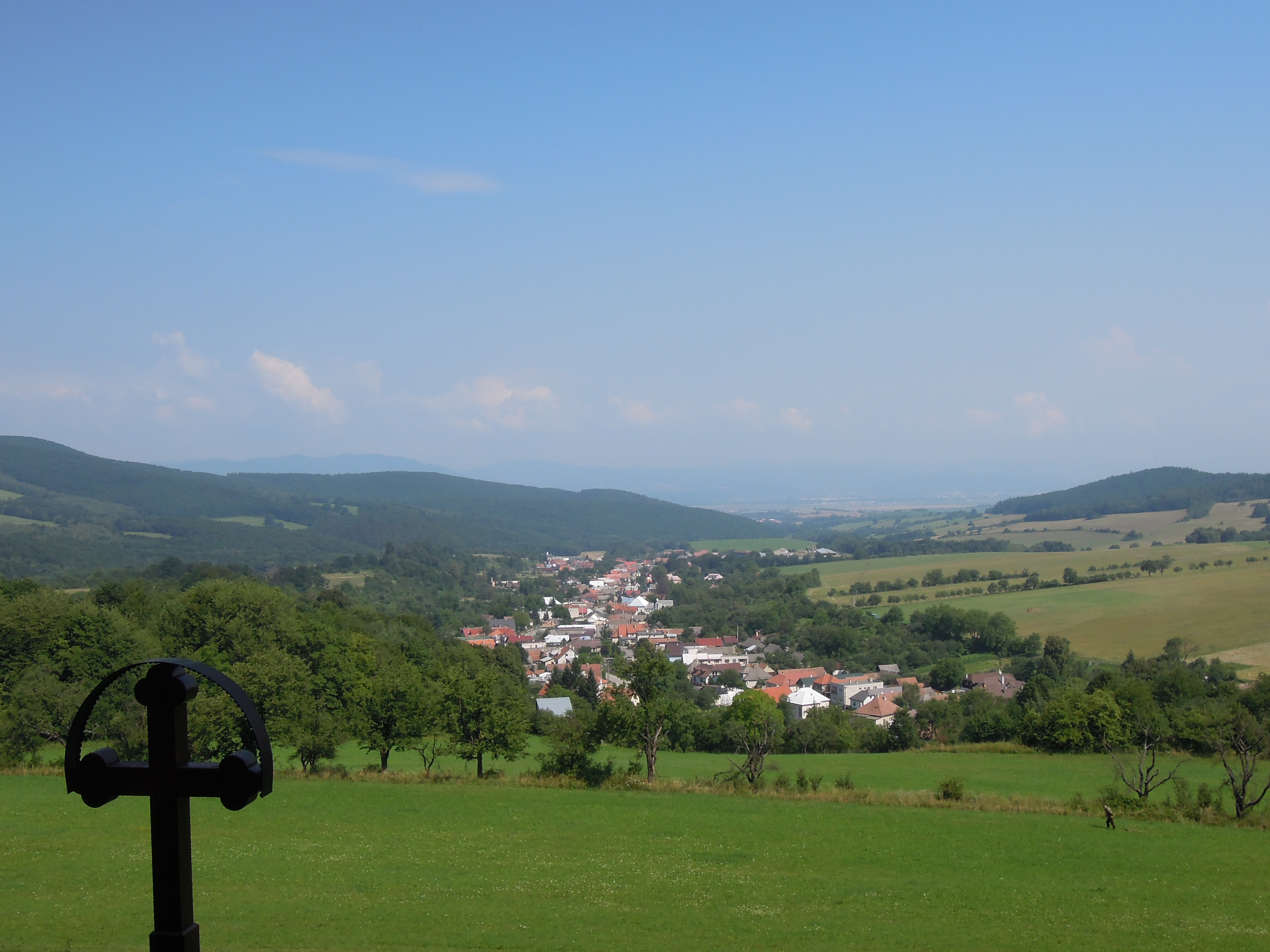

- Flag

- Location of Selec in the Trenčín Region Location of Selec in Slovakia
- Coordinates: 48.78°N 17.98°E
- Country: Slovakia
- Region: Trenčín Region
- District: Trenčín District
- First mentioned: 1439

Area
  - Total: 24.80 km^{2} (9.58 sq mi)
- Elevation: 323 m (1,060 ft)

Population (2025)
  - Total: 1,010
- Time zone: UTC+1 (CET)
  - Summer (DST): UTC+2 (CEST)
- Postal code: 913 36
- Area code: +421 32
- Vehicle registration plate (until 2022): TN
- Website: www.selec.sk

Selec (Hungarian: Szelec) is a village and municipality in Trenčín District in the Trenčín Region of north-western Slovakia.

== History ==
The village was first mentioned in historical records of 1439. During World War II, on the December 3, 1944, German troops invaded the village and arrested 56 men from the village for help to partisans. 50 from them have been later taken to the concentration camps where 45 of them died.

== Geography ==
The municipality lies at an altitude of 323 metres (1,060 ft) and covers an area of 24.80 km^{2} (9.58 sq mi) (2025). From a geomorphological point of view of the village lies in Fatra-Tatra Area in the northern part of the Považský Inovec Mts.

== Population ==
Population statistic (10 years)
Year	1995	2005	2015	2025
Count	897	969	1005	1010
Difference		+8.02%	+3.71%	+0.49%

Population statistic
Year	2024	2025
Count	1007	1010
Difference		+0.29%

It has a population of 1010 people (31 December 2025).

=== Ethnicity ===
Census 2021 (1+ %)
Ethnicity	Number	Fraction
Slovak	991	98.41%
Czech	16	1.58%
Total	1007	

In year 2021 was 1007 people by ethnicity 991 as Slovak, 16 as Czech, 9 as Not found out, 3 as Russian, 2 as Other, 1 as Turkish, 1 as Italian, 1 as Silesian and 1 as Hungarian.

Note on population: The difference values of population numbers in the table "Population statistic" and in the sections "Ethnicity" & "Religion" is caused by the use of various statistical methods.

=== Religion ===
Census 2021 (1+ %)
Religion	Number	Fraction
Roman Catholic Church	753	74.78%
None	142	14.1%
Evangelical Church	85	8.44%
Total	1007	

In year 2021 was 1007 people by religion 753 from Roman Catholic Church, 142 from None, 85 from Evangelical Church, 6 from Not found out, 6 from Greek Catholic Church, 4 from Other, 3 from Ad hoc movements, 1 from Jewish community, 1 from Old Catholic Church, 1 from Calvinist Church, 1 from Eastern Orthodox Church, 1 from Paganism and natural spirituality, 1 from Other and not ascertained christian church, 1 from United Methodist Church and 1 from Seventh-day Adventist Church.
