= Tatiana Korcová =

Slovak physicist (1937–1997)

- Born: 7 March 1937; Trenčianska Teplá, Czechoslovakia
- Died: 12 November 1997 (aged 60); Bratislava, Slovakia
- Occupation: Physicist

Academic background
- Education: Comenius University

Academic work
- Discipline: Physics
- Institutions: Constantine the Philosopher University in Nitra

Tatiana Korcová. (7 March 1937 – 12 November 1997) was a Slovak physicist specializing in the study of solar winds.

Tatiana Korcová was born on 7 March 1937 in Trenčianska Teplá. She studied Physics and Chemistry at the Comenius University, graduating in 1959. Following graduation she briefly worked as a high school teacher in Trenčín. In 1963 she joined the Constantine the Philosopher University in Nitra, where she spent her entire career.

Korcová studied cosmic radiation and high-energy particles in close cooperation with Slovak Academy of Sciences. In 1985 she was awarded the Candidate of Sciences degree by the academy. Korcová's habilitation thesis, which she passed in 1994, was on the issue of long-term solar wind variations.

Tatiana Korcová died on 12 November 1997 at the age of 60 in Bratislava.
