= Bobot, Trenčín District =

Village and municipality in Slovakia

Bobot
- Municipality
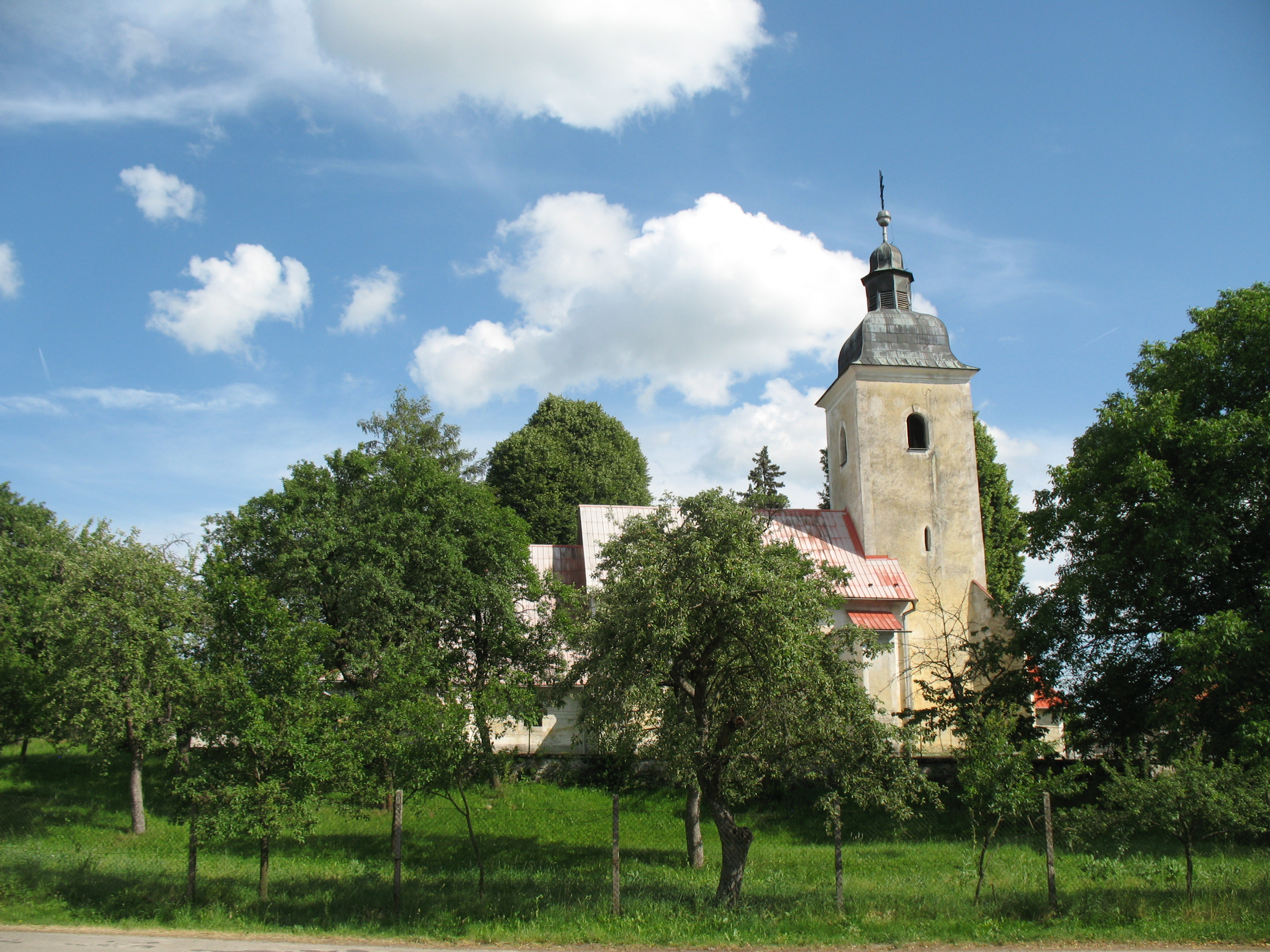

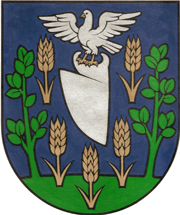
- Flag Coat of arms

- Location of Bobot in the Trenčín Region Location of Bobot in Slovakia
- Coordinates: 48°48′N 18°11′E
- Country: Slovakia
- Region: Trenčín Region
- District: Trenčín District
- First mentioned: 1332

Area
  - Total: 16.07 km^{2} (6.20 sq mi)
- Elevation: 241 m (791 ft)

Population (2025)
  - Total: 739
- Time zone: UTC+1 (CET)
  - Summer (DST): UTC+2 (CEST)
- Postal code: 913 25
- Area code: +421 32
- Vehicle registration plate (until 2022): TN
- Website: www.bobot.sk

Bobot (Hungarian: Bobót) is a village and municipality in Trenčín District in the Trenčín Region of north-western Slovakia.

== History ==
In historical records the village was first mentioned in 1332.

== Geography ==
The municipality lies at an altitude of 241 metres (791 ft) and covers an area of 16.07 km^{2} (6.20 sq mi) (2025).

== Population ==
Population statistic (10 years)
| Year | 1995 | 2005 | 2015 | 2025 |
|---|---|---|---|---|
| Count | 761 | 719 | 742 | 739 |
| Difference | | −5.51% | +3.19% | −0.40% |

Population statistic
| Year | 2024 | 2025 |
|---|---|---|
| Count | 719 | 739 |
| Difference | | +2.78% |

It has a population of 739 people (31 December 2025).

=== Ethnicity ===
Census 2021 (1+ %)
| Ethnicity | Number | Fraction |
|---|---|---|
| Slovak | 729 | 97.85% |
| Not found out | 12 | 1.61% |
| Total | 745 | |

In year 2021 was 745 people by ethnicity 729 as Slovak, 12 as Not found out, 4 as Czech, 2 as German, 2 as Moravian, 1 as Jewish, 1 as Russian, 1 as Austrian, 1 as Polish, 1 as Hungarian and 1 as Other.

Note on population: The difference values of population numbers in the table "Population statistic" and in the sections "Ethnicity" & "Religion" is caused by the use of various statistical methods.

=== Religion ===
Census 2021 (1+ %)
| Religion | Number | Fraction |
|---|---|---|
| Roman Catholic Church | 585 | 78.52% |
| None | 124 | 16.64% |
| Not found out | 17 | 2.28% |
| Evangelical Church | 10 | 1.34% |
| Total | 745 | |

In year 2021 was 745 people by religion 585 from Roman Catholic Church, 124 from None, 17 from Not found out, 10 from Evangelical Church, 3 from Greek Catholic Church, 2 from Other, 1 from Jewish community, 1 from Christian Congregations in Slovakia, 1 from Buddhism and 1 from Ad hoc movements.

== Genealogical resources ==
The records for genealogical research are available at the state archive "Statny Archiv in Bratislava, Nitra, Slovakia"

- Roman Catholic church records (births/marriages/deaths): 1725-1898 (parish A)

== Notable people ==
- Mikuláš Jozef Lexmann (1899 – 1952) Dominican priest

== See also ==
- List of municipalities and towns in Slovakia
