= Petrova Lehota =

- Municipality
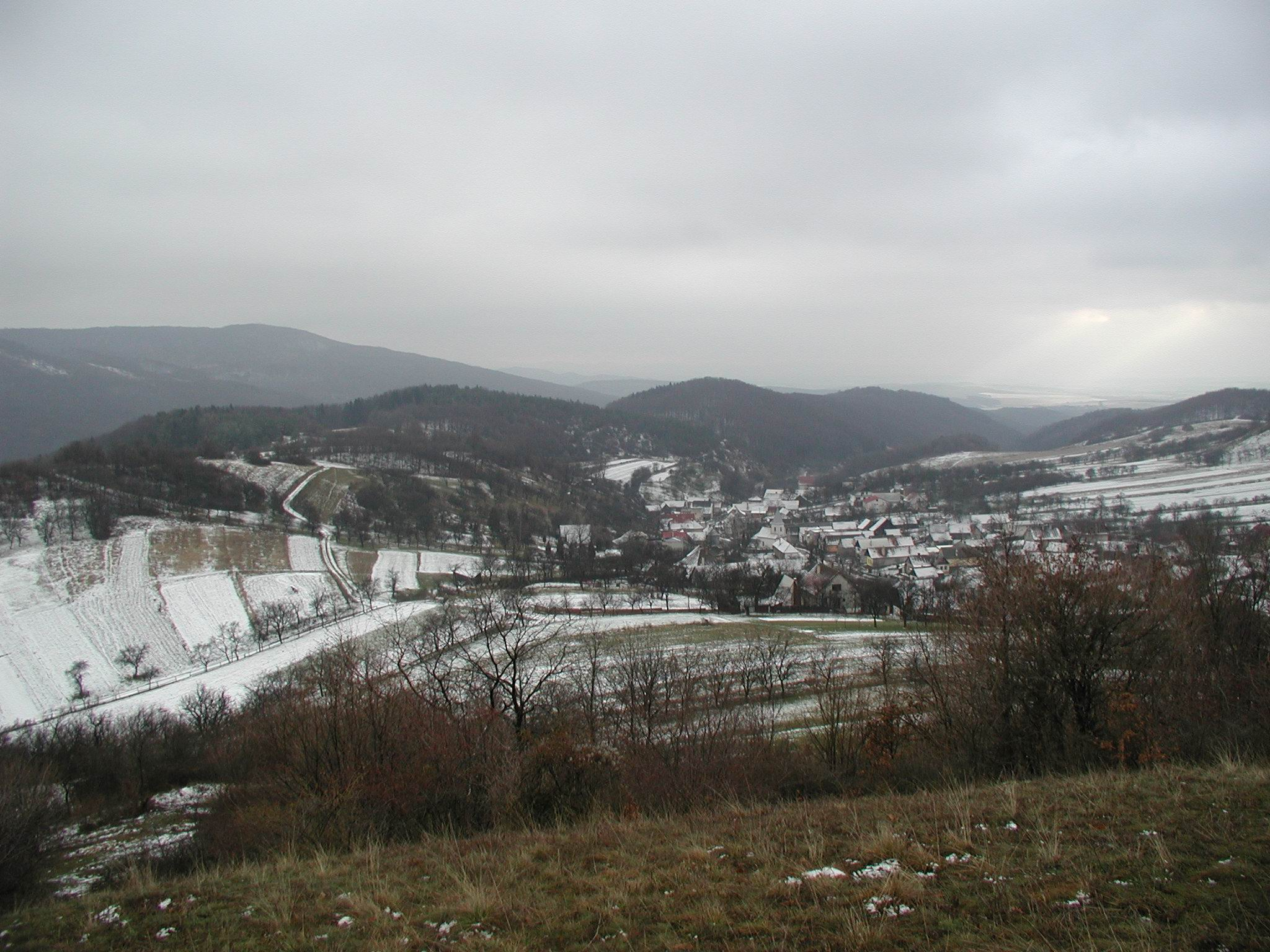

- Flag

- Location of Petrova Lehota in the Trenčín Region Location of Petrova Lehota in Slovakia
- Coordinates: 48.87°N 18.18°E
- Country: Slovakia
- Region: Trenčín Region
- District: Trenčín District
- First mentioned: 1346

Area
  - Total: 8.06 km^{2} (3.11 sq mi)
- Elevation: 402 m (1,319 ft)

Population (2025)
  - Total: 187
- Time zone: UTC+1 (CET)
  - Summer (DST): UTC+2 (CEST)
- Postal code: 913 26
- Area code: +421 32
- Vehicle registration plate (until 2022): TN
- Website: www.petrovalehota.sk

Petrova Lehota (Hungarian: Péterszabadja) is a village and municipality in Trenčín District in the Trenčín Region of north-western Slovakia.

== History ==
In historical records the village was first mentioned in 1346.

== Geography ==
The municipality lies at an altitude of 402 metres (1,319 ft) and covers an area of 8.06 km^{2} (3.11 sq mi) (2025).

== Population ==
Population statistic (10 years)
Year	1995	2005	2015	2025
Count	208	165	183	187
Difference		−20.67%	+10.90%	+2.18%

Population statistic
Year	2024	2025
Count	192	187
Difference		−2.60%

It has a population of 187 people (31 December 2025).

=== Ethnicity ===
Census 2021 (1+ %)
Ethnicity	Number	Fraction
Slovak	193	96.98%
Not found out	6	3.01%
Other	5	2.51%
Total	199	

In year 2021 was 199 people by ethnicity 193 as Slovak, 6 as Not found out, 5 as Other and 1 as German.

Note on population: The difference values of population numbers in the table "Population statistic" and in the sections "Ethnicity" & "Religion" is caused by the use of various statistical methods.

=== Religion ===
Census 2021 (1+ %)
Religion	Number	Fraction
Roman Catholic Church	158	79.4%
None	28	14.07%
Islam	5	2.51%
Not found out	4	2.01%
Christian Congregations in Slovakia	3	1.51%
Total	199	

In year 2021 was 199 people by religion 158 from Roman Catholic Church, 28 from None, 5 from Islam, 4 from Not found out, 3 from Christian Congregations in Slovakia and 1 from Ad hoc movements.
