= Horné Srnie =

Village and municipality in Slovakia

- Municipality
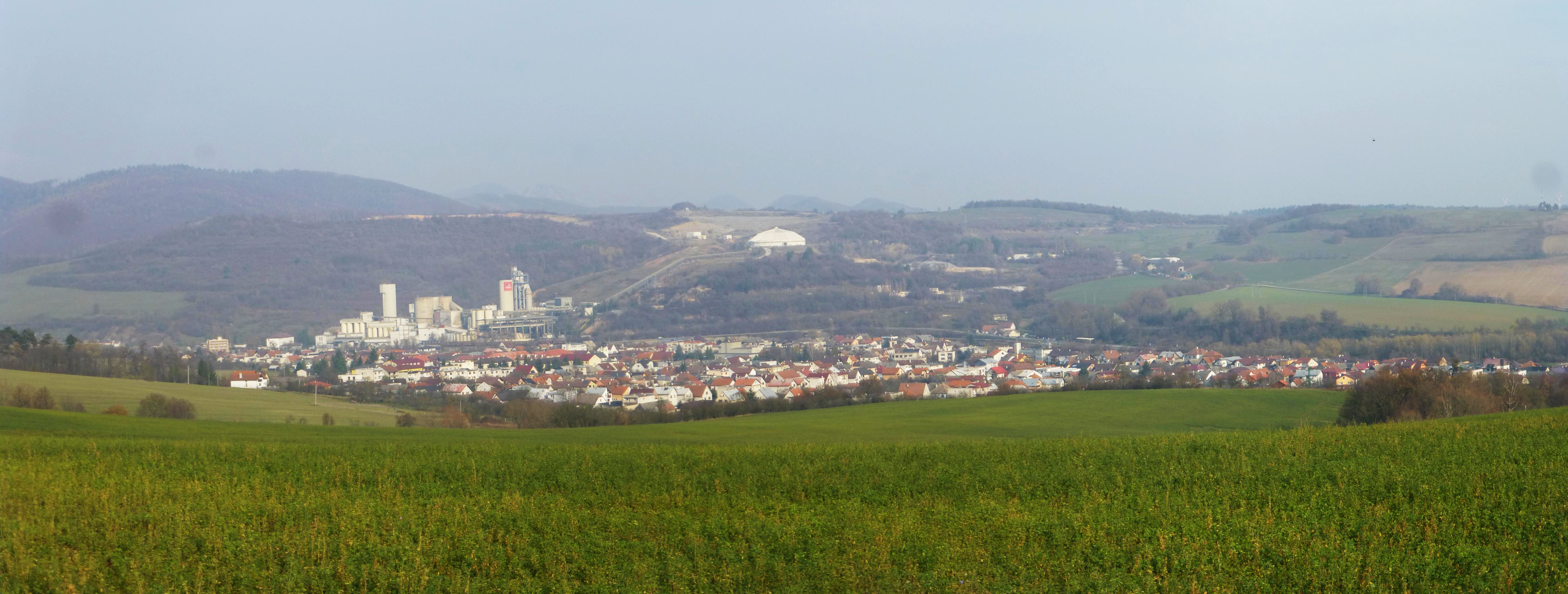

- Flag

- Location of Horné Srnie in the Trenčín Region Location of Horné Srnie in Slovakia
- Coordinates: 48.98°N 18.10°E
- Country: Slovakia
- Region: Trenčín Region
- District: Trenčín District
- First mentioned: 1439

Area
  - Total: 27.06 km^{2} (10.45 sq mi)
- Elevation: 242 m (794 ft)

Population (2025)
  - Total: 2,648
- Time zone: UTC+1 (CET)
  - Summer (DST): UTC+2 (CEST)
- Postal code: 914 42
- Area code: +421 32
- Vehicle registration plate (until 2022): TN
- Website: www.hornesrnie.sk

Horné Srnie (Hungarian: Felsőszernye) is a village and municipality in Trenčín District in the Trenčín Region of north-western Slovakia.

== History ==
In historical records the village was first mentioned in 1439.

== Geography ==
The municipality lies at an altitude of 242 metres (794 ft) and covers an area of 27.06 km^{2} (10.45 sq mi) (2025).

== Population ==
Population statistic (10 years)
| Year | 1995 | 2005 | 2015 | 2025 |
|---|---|---|---|---|
| Count | 2863 | 2890 | 2802 | 2648 |
| Difference | | +0.94% | −3.04% | −5.49% |

Population statistic
| Year | 2024 | 2025 |
|---|---|---|
| Count | 2679 | 2648 |
| Difference | | −1.15% |

It has a population of 2648 people (31 December 2025).

=== Ethnicity ===
Census 2021 (1+ %)
| Ethnicity | Number | Fraction |
|---|---|---|
| Slovak | 2564 | 94.71% |
| Not found out | 127 | 4.69% |
| Czech | 40 | 1.47% |
| Total | 2707 | |

In year 2021 was 2707 people by ethnicity 2564 as Slovak, 127 as Not found out, 40 as Czech, 8 as Other, 5 as Russian, 3 as Moravian, 1 as Ukrainian, 1 as Turkish, 1 as Romani, 1 as Austrian and 1 as English.

Note on population: The difference values of population numbers in the table "Population statistic" and in the sections "Ethnicity" & "Religion" is caused by the use of various statistical methods.

=== Religion ===
Census 2021 (1+ %)
| Religion | Number | Fraction |
|---|---|---|
| Roman Catholic Church | 2203 | 81.38% |
| None | 311 | 11.49% |
| Not found out | 125 | 4.62% |
| Total | 2707 | |

In year 2021 was 2707 people by religion 2203 from Roman Catholic Church, 311 from None, 125 from Not found out, 20 from Evangelical Church, 12 from Greek Catholic Church, 11 from Other, 8 from Ad hoc movements, 5 from Christian Congregations in Slovakia, 4 from Islam, 2 from Calvinist Church, 2 from Eastern Orthodox Church, 1 from Old Catholic Church, 1 from Paganism and natural spirituality, 1 from Hinduism and 1 from Buddhism.

== Points of interest ==
On Nad Oborou a mountain which belongs to Horné Srnie, there is a 122 metres tall broadcasting tower.

== Genealogical resources ==
The records for genealogical research are available at the state archive "Statny Archiv in Bratislava, Slovakia"

- Roman Catholic church records (births/marriages/deaths): 1789-1896 (parish A)

== See also ==
- List of municipalities and towns in Slovakia
