= Štvrtok =

- Municipality
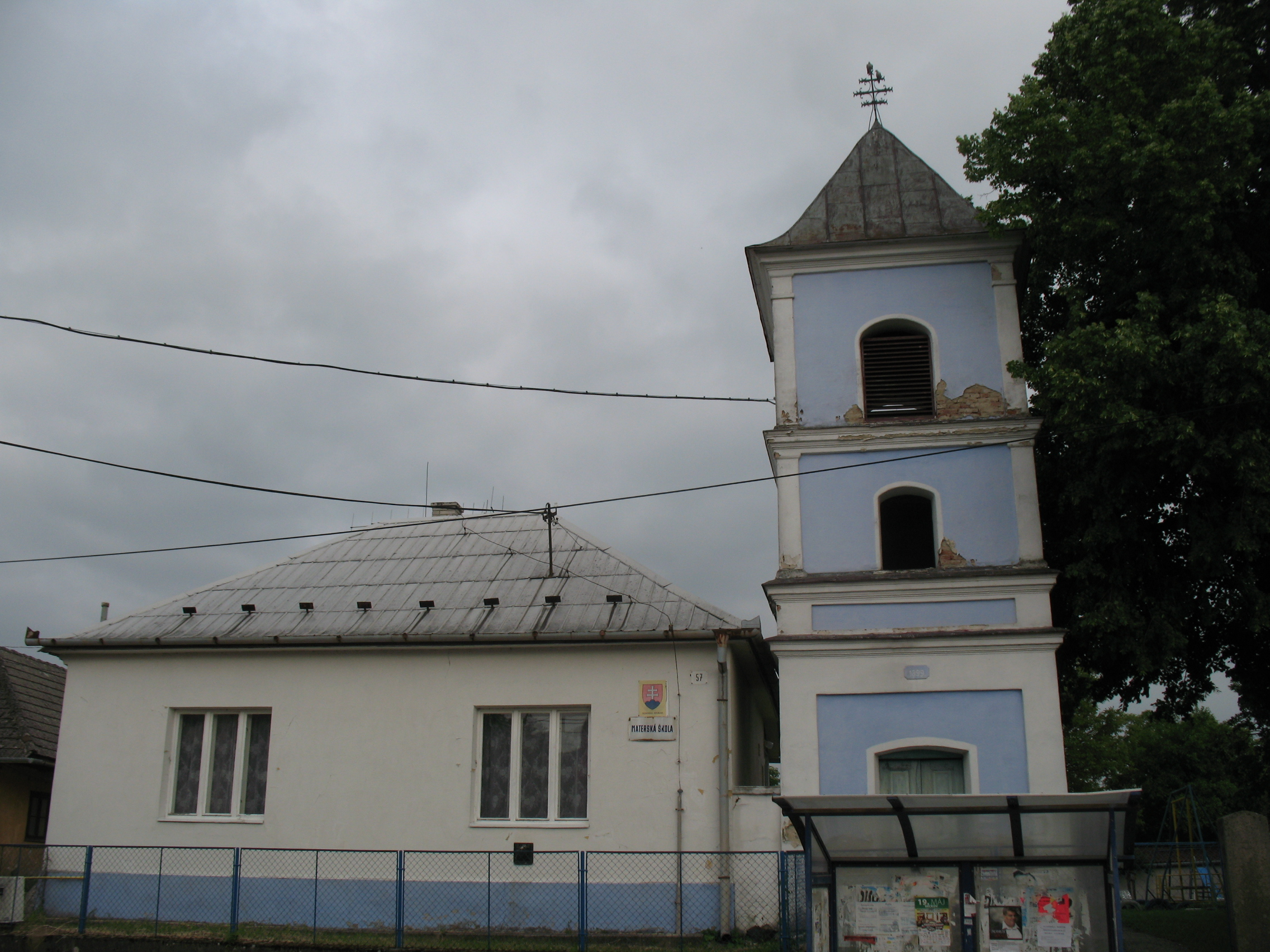

- Flag

- Location of Štvrtok in the Trenčín Region Location of Štvrtok in Slovakia
- Coordinates: 48.82°N 17.88°E
- Country: Slovakia
- Region: Trenčín Region
- District: Trenčín District
- First mentioned: 1477

Area
  - Total: 4.08 km^{2} (1.58 sq mi)
- Elevation: 197 m (646 ft)

Population (2025)
  - Total: 481
- Time zone: UTC+1 (CET)
  - Summer (DST): UTC+2 (CEST)
- Postal code: 913 05
- Area code: +421 32
- Vehicle registration plate (until 2022): TN
- Website: www.stvrtok.com

Štvrtok (Hungarian: Vágcsütörtök) is a village and municipality in Trenčín District in the Trenčín Region of north-western Slovakia.

== History ==
In historical records, the village was first mentioned in 1477.

The village was mainly occupied with agriculture, holding livestock and producing cereals, hops and grapes. In 1769, there were mentions of vineyards in Štvrtok, and surrounding villages. However, local vineyards disappeared in the second half of the 19th century, likely due to the spread of phylloxera.

== Geography ==
The municipality lies at an altitude of 197 metres (646 ft) and covers an area of 4.08 km^{2} (1.58 sq mi) (2025). It lies on the Váh river, at the foot of the White Carpathians, in the Považie basin and nearby the Bošácká valley.

== Population ==
Population statistic (10 years)
Year	1995	2005	2015	2025
Count	340	373	356	481
Difference		+9.70%	−4.55%	+35.11%

Population statistic
Year	2024	2025
Count	478	481
Difference		+0.62%

It has a population of 481 people (31 December 2025).

=== Ethnicity ===
Census 2021 (1+ %)
Ethnicity	Number	Fraction
Slovak	411	96.93%
Czech	10	2.35%
Not found out	6	1.41%
Total	424	

In year 2021 was 424 people by ethnicity 411 as Slovak, 10 as Czech, 6 as Not found out, 2 as Hungarian, 1 as Romani, 1 as Russian, 1 as Other and 1 as English.

Note on population: The difference values of population numbers in the table "Population statistic" and in the sections "Ethnicity" & "Religion" is caused by the use of various statistical methods.

=== Religion ===
Census 2021 (1+ %)
Religion	Number	Fraction
Roman Catholic Church	174	41.04%
None	119	28.07%
Evangelical Church	116	27.36%
Not found out	6	1.42%
Total	424	

In year 2021 was 424 people by religion 174 from Roman Catholic Church, 119 from None, 116 from Evangelical Church, 6 from Not found out, 4 from Other and not ascertained christian church, 3 from Ad hoc movements, 1 from Greek Catholic Church and 1 from United Methodist Church.

== Trivia ==
'Štvrtok' is the Slovak word for Thursday. 'Csütörtök' is the Hungarian word for Thursday.
