= Omšenie =

Village in Trenčín, Slovakia

- Municipality
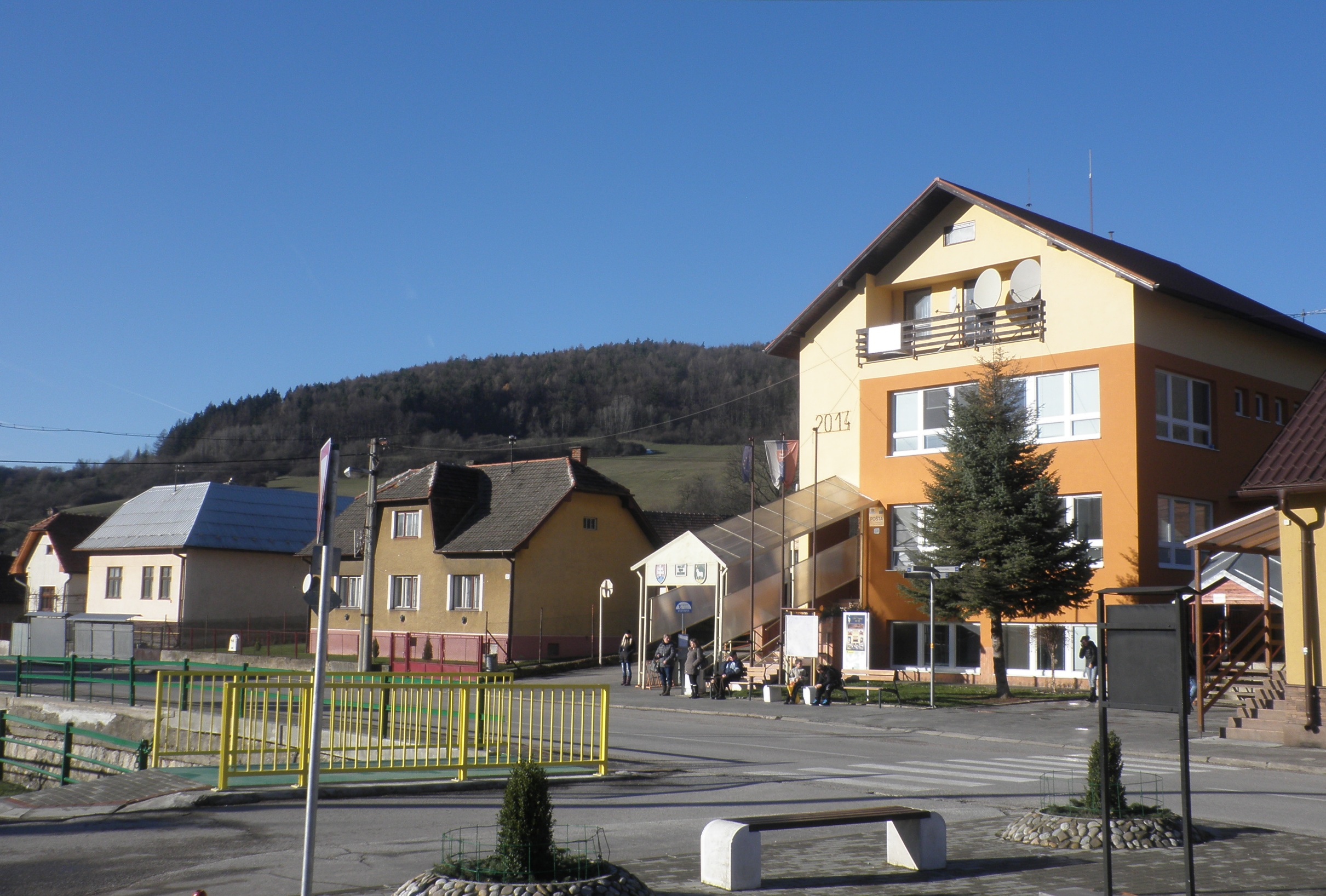

- Flag

- Location of Omšenie in the Trenčín Region Location of Omšenie in Slovakia
- Coordinates: 48.90°N 18.23°E
- Country: Slovakia
- Region: Trenčín Region
- District: Trenčín District
- First mentioned: 1332

Area
  - Total: 18.57 km^{2} (7.17 sq mi)
- Elevation: 325 m (1,066 ft)

Population (2025)
  - Total: 1,809
- Time zone: UTC+1 (CET)
  - Summer (DST): UTC+2 (CEST)
- Postal code: 914 43
- Area code: +421 32
- Vehicle registration plate (until 2022): TN
- Website: www.omsenie.sk

Omšenie (Hungarian: Nagysziklás) is a village and municipality in the Trenčín District of the Trenčín Region in northwestern Slovakia.

== History ==
Omšenie was first documented in papal tithe records dating from 1332 to 1337, which mention a priest serving the settlement. In 1348, King Louis I of Hungary granted the village, then recorded as "Missyn", to the brothers Mikuláš and Štefan of Baračka.

== Geography ==
The municipality lies at an altitude of 325 metres (1,066 ft) and covers an area of 18.57 km^{2} (7.17 sq mi) (2025).

== Population ==
Population statistic (10 years)
Year	1995	2005	2015	2025
Count	1940	1960	1971	1809
Difference		+1.03%	+0.56%	−8.21%

Population statistic
Year	2024	2025
Count	1816	1809
Difference		−0.38%

It has a population of 1809 people (31 December 2025).

=== Ethnicity ===
Census 2021 (1+%)
Ethnicity	Number	Fraction
Slovak	1829	97.02%
Not found out	48	2.54%
Total	1885	

In year 2021 was 1885 people by ethnicity 1829 as Slovak, 48 as Not found out, 13 as Czech, 4 as Polish, 3 as Italian, 3 as Other, 2 as Hungarian, 1 as Romani, 1 as Russian, 1 as German, 1 as French and 1 as Albanian.

Note on population: The difference values of population numbers in the table "Population statistic" and in the sections "Ethnicity" & "Religion" is caused by the use of various statistical methods.

=== Religion ===
Census 2021 (1+%)
Religion	Number	Fraction
Roman Catholic Church	1588	84.24%
None	212	11.25%
Not found out	54	2.86%
Total	1885	

In year 2021 was 1885 people by religion 1588 from Roman Catholic Church, 212 from None, 54 from Not found out, 11 from Evangelical Church, 6 from Greek Catholic Church, 4 from Ad hoc movements, 3 from Apostolic Church, 2 from Christian Congregations in Slovakia, 2 from Seventh-day Adventist Church, 1 from Jehovah's Witnesses, 1 from Hinduism and 1 from Church of Jesus Christ of Latter-day Saints.
