= Svinná =

- Municipality
- Flag

- Location of Svinná in the Trenčín Region Location of Svinná in Slovakia
- Coordinates: 48.7858°N 18.1631°E
- Country: Slovakia
- Region: Trenčín Region
- District: Trenčín District
- First mentioned: 1439

Area
  - Total: 8.60 km^{2} (3.32 sq mi)
- Elevation: 240 m (790 ft)

Population (2025)
  - Total: 1,601
- Time zone: UTC+1 (CET)
  - Summer (DST): UTC+2 (CEST)
- Postal code: 913 24
- Area code: +421 32
- Vehicle registration plate (until 2022): TN
- Website: www.svinna.sk

Svinná (Hungarian: Bercsény) is a village and municipality in Trenčín District in the Trenčín Region of north-western Slovakia.

== History ==
In historical records the village was first mentioned in 1439.

== Geography ==
The municipality lies at an altitude of 240 metres (790 ft) and covers an area of 8.60 km^{2} (3.32 sq mi) (2025).

== Population ==
Population statistic (10 years)
Year	1995	2005	2015	2025
Count	1509	1530	1594	1601
Difference		+1.39%	+4.18%	+0.43%

Population statistic
Year	2024	2025
Count	1594	1601
Difference		+0.43%

It has a population of 1601 people (31 December 2025).

=== Ethnicity ===
Census 2021 (1+ %)
Ethnicity	Number	Fraction
Slovak	1546	97.17%
Not found out	48	3.01%
Total	1591	

In year 2021 was 1591 people by ethnicity 1546 as Slovak, 48 as Not found out, 12 as Czech, 4 as Other, 3 as French, 2 as Italian, 2 as Russian, 2 as Polish, 2 as Moravian, 2 as Hungarian and 1 as Rusyn.

Note on population: The difference values of population numbers in the table "Population statistic" and in the sections "Ethnicity" & "Religion" is caused by the use of various statistical methods.

=== Religion ===
Census 2021 (1+ %)
Religion	Number	Fraction
Roman Catholic Church	1277	80.26%
None	191	12.01%
Not found out	72	4.53%
Evangelical Church	24	1.51%
Total	1591	

In year 2021 was 1591 people by religion 1277 from Roman Catholic Church, 191 from None, 72 from Not found out, 24 from Evangelical Church, 6 from Christian Congregations in Slovakia, 6 from Other, 5 from Ad hoc movements, 3 from Greek Catholic Church, 2 from Other and not ascertained christian church, 1 from Eastern Orthodox Church, 1 from Islam, 1 from Hinduism, 1 from United Methodist Church and 1 from Czechoslovak Hussite Church.
