= Opatovce =

Municipality of Slovakia

- Municipality
- Flag

- Location of Opatovce in the Trenčín Region Location of Opatovce in Slovakia
- Coordinates: 48.87°N 17.98°E
- Country: Slovakia
- Region: Trenčín Region
- District: Trenčín District
- First mentioned: 1113

Government
  - Mayor: Iveta Mondeková (Ind.)

Area
  - Total: 2.89 km^{2} (1.12 sq mi)
- Elevation: 199 m (653 ft)

Population (2025)
  - Total: 425
- Time zone: UTC+1 (CET)
  - Summer (DST): UTC+2 (CEST)
- Postal code: 913 11
- Area code: +421 32
- Vehicle registration plate (until 2022): TN
- Website: www.opatovce.sk

Opatovce (Hungarian: Vágapáti) is a village and municipality in Trenčín District in the Trenčín Region of northwestern Slovakia.

== History ==
The earliest surviving mention of the village in historical records dates to 1113.

In 1956 Opatove was voted Slovakia's best village in Slovakia's best village competition.

== Geography ==
The municipality lies at an altitude of 199 metres (653 ft) and covers an area of 2.89 km^{2} (1.12 sq mi) (2025).

== Population ==
Population statistic (10 years)
Year	1995	2005	2015	2025
Count	421	397	408	425
Difference		−5.70%	+2.77%	+4.16%

Population statistic
Year	2024	2025
Count	433	425
Difference		−1.84%

It has a population of 425 people (31 December 2025).

=== Ethnicity ===
Census 2021 (1+ %)
Ethnicity	Number	Fraction
Slovak	421	99.05%
Czech	5	1.17%
Total	425	

In year 2021 was 425 people by ethnicity 421 as Slovak, 5 as Czech, 4 as Not found out and 1 as Irish.

Note on population: The difference values of population numbers in the table "Population statistic" and in the sections "Ethnicity" & "Religion" is caused by the use of various statistical methods.

=== Religion ===
Census 2021 (1+ %)
Religion	Number	Fraction
Roman Catholic Church	344	80.94%
None	50	11.76%
Evangelical Church	21	4.94%
Greek Catholic Church	5	1.18%
Total	425	

In year 2021 was 425 people by religion 344 from Roman Catholic Church, 50 from None, 21 from Evangelical Church, 5 from Greek Catholic Church, 4 from Other and 1 from Not found out.
