= Trenčianska Teplá =

- Municipality
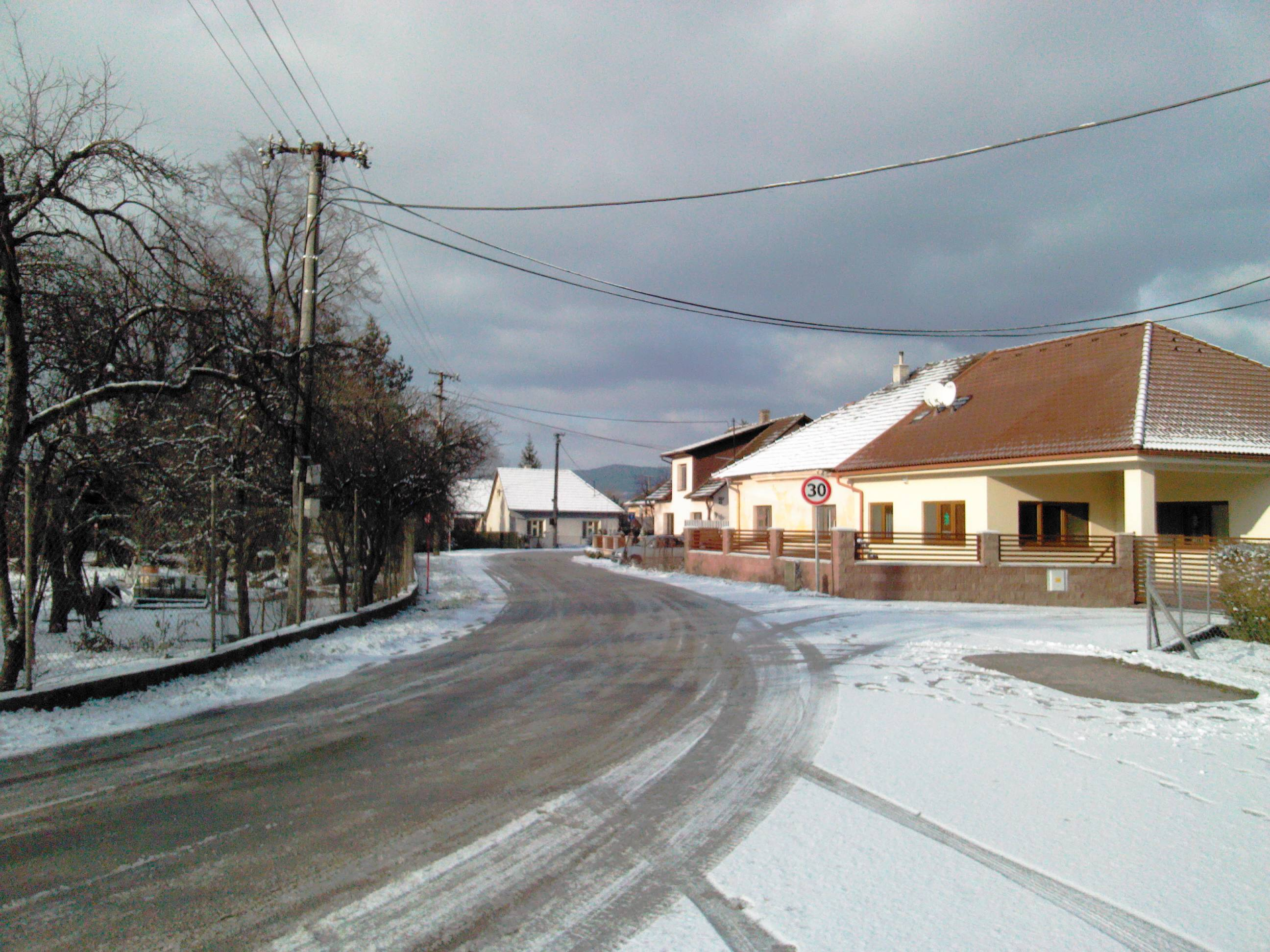

- Flag

- Location of Trenčianska Teplá in the Trenčín Region Location of Trenčianska Teplá in Slovakia
- Coordinates: 48.93°N 18.12°E
- Country: Slovakia
- Region: Trenčín Region
- District: Trenčín District
- First mentioned: 1155

Area
  - Total: 15.13 km^{2} (5.84 sq mi)
- Elevation: 224 m (735 ft)

Population (2025)
  - Total: 4,131
- Time zone: UTC+1 (CET)
  - Summer (DST): UTC+2 (CEST)
- Postal code: 914 01
- Area code: +421 32
- Vehicle registration plate (until 2022): TN
- Website: www.trencianskatepla.sk

Trenčianska Teplá (Hungarian: Hőlak) is a village and municipality in Trenčín District in the Trenčín Region of north-western Slovakia.

== History ==
In historical records the village was first mentioned in 1155.

== Geography ==
The municipality lies at an altitude of 224 metres (735 ft) and covers an area of 15.13 km^{2} (5.84 sq mi) (2025).

== Population ==
Population statistic (10 years)
Year	1995	2005	2015	2025
Count	3713	3919	4216	4131
Difference		+5.54%	+7.57%	−2.01%

Population statistic
Year	2024	2025
Count	4162	4131
Difference		−0.74%

It has a population of 4131 people (31 December 2025).

=== Ethnicity ===
Census 2021 (1+ %)
Ethnicity	Number	Fraction
Slovak	4109	97.32%
Not found out	83	1.96%
Total	4222	

In year 2021 was 4222 people by ethnicity 4109 as Slovak, 83 as Not found out, 32 as Czech, 14 as Other, 11 as Romani, 10 as Hungarian, 5 as Italian, 3 as Russian, 3 as Polish, 2 as Serbian, 2 as Rusyn, 2 as Canadian, 2 as Greek, 2 as Bulgarian, 1 as Jewish, 1 as Irish, 1 as Ukrainian and 1 as Croatian.

Note on population: The difference values of population numbers in the table "Population statistic" and in the sections "Ethnicity" & "Religion" is caused by the use of various statistical methods.

=== Religion ===
Census 2021 (1+ %)
Religion	Number	Fraction
Roman Catholic Church	2927	69.33%
None	951	22.52%
Not found out	149	3.53%
Evangelical Church	81	1.92%
Total	4222	

In year 2021 was 4222 people by religion 2927 from Roman Catholic Church, 951 from None, 149 from Not found out, 81 from Evangelical Church, 23 from Greek Catholic Church, 17 from Jehovah's Witnesses, 14 from Ad hoc movements, 10 from Other, 9 from Eastern Orthodox Church, 8 from Other and not ascertained christian church, 8 from Christian Congregations in Slovakia, 7 from Buddhism, 6 from Paganism and natural spirituality, 4 from Islam, 3 from Calvinist Church, 3 from Apostolic Church, 1 from Old Catholic Church and 1 from United Methodist Church.

== Notable people ==
- Tatiana Korcová (1937–1997), Physicist
