= Trenčianske Mitice =

- Municipality
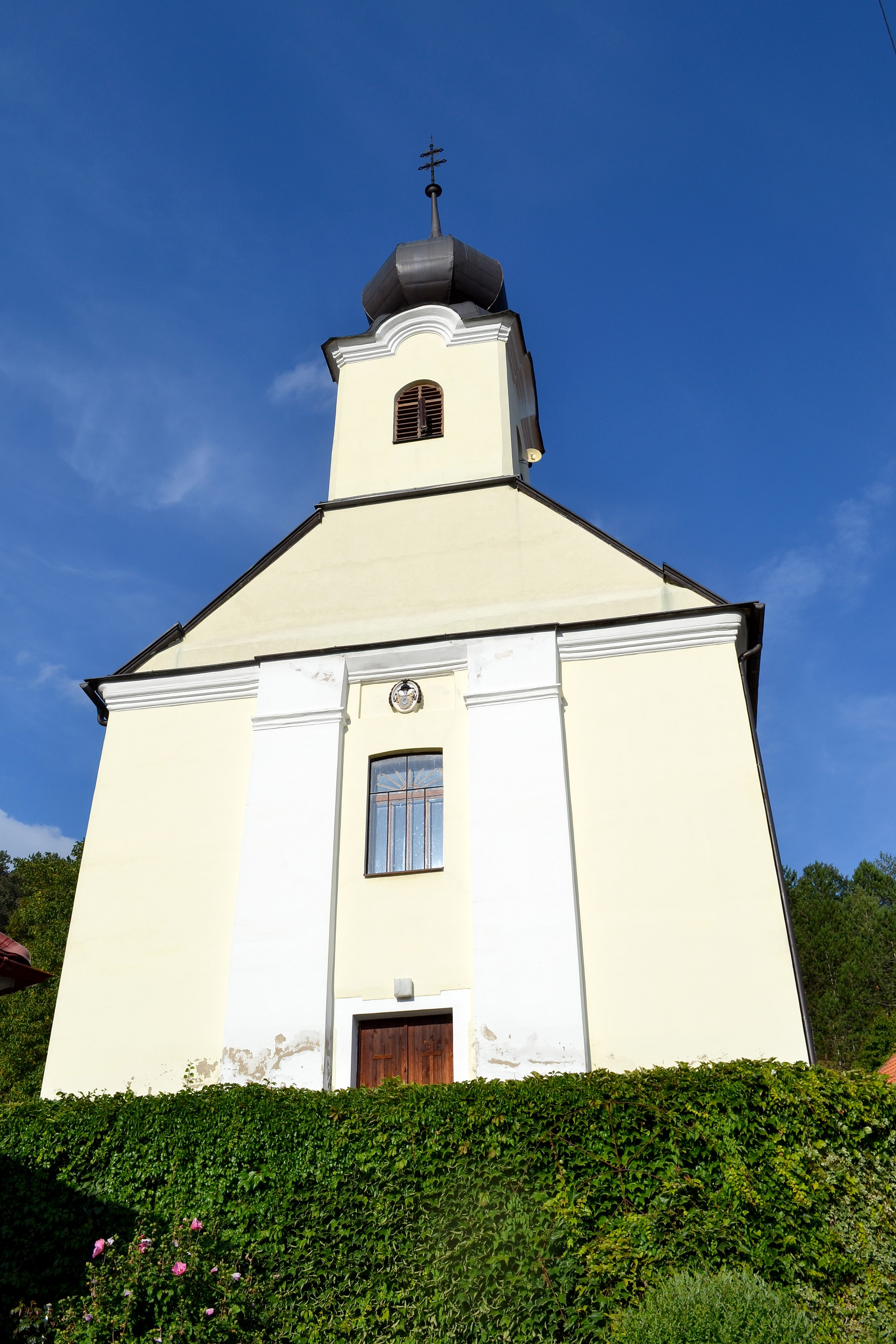

- Flag

- Location of Trenčianske Mitice in the Trenčín Region Location of Trenčianske Mitice in Slovakia
- Coordinates: 48.82°N 18.12°E
- Country: Slovakia
- Region: Trenčín Region
- District: Trenčín District
- First mentioned: 1269

Area
  - Total: 12.83 km^{2} (4.95 sq mi)
- Elevation: 328 m (1,076 ft)

Population (2025)
  - Total: 867
- Time zone: UTC+1 (CET)
  - Summer (DST): UTC+2 (CEST)
- Postal code: 913 22
- Area code: +421 32
- Vehicle registration plate (until 2022): TN
- Website: www.trencianskemitice.sk

Trenčianske Mitice (Hungarian: Trencsénmitta) is a village and municipality in Trenčín District in the Trenčín Region of north-western Slovakia.

== History ==
The current village was formed in 1960 through the merging of three villages - Zemianske Mitice, Kostolné Mitice a Rožňové Mitice. In historical records the village was first mentioned in 1269.

== Geography ==
The municipality lies at an altitude of 328 metres (1,076 ft) and covers an area of 12.83 km^{2} (4.95 sq mi) (2025).

== Population ==
Population statistic (10 years)
Year	1995	2005	2015	2025
Count	725	733	767	867
Difference		+1.10%	+4.63%	+13.03%

Population statistic
Year	2024	2025
Count	877	867
Difference		−1.14%

It has a population of 867 people (31 December 2025).

=== Ethnicity ===
Census 2021 (1+ %)
Ethnicity	Number	Fraction
Slovak	779	98.98%
Total	787	

In year 2021 was 787 people by ethnicity 779 as Slovak, 5 as Czech, 3 as Romani, 2 as Not found out, 2 as Hungarian, 2 as Other and 1 as Russian.

Note on population: The difference values of population numbers in the table "Population statistic" and in the sections "Ethnicity" & "Religion" is caused by the use of various statistical methods.

=== Religion ===
Census 2021 (1+ %)
Religion	Number	Fraction
Roman Catholic Church	621	78.91%
None	133	16.9%
Greek Catholic Church	8	1.02%
Total	787	

In year 2021 was 787 people by religion 621 from Roman Catholic Church, 133 from None, 8 from Greek Catholic Church, 7 from Not found out, 4 from Christian Congregations in Slovakia, 4 from Evangelical Church, 3 from Jehovah's Witnesses, 2 from Other and not ascertained christian church, 2 from Ad hoc movements, 1 from Paganism and natural spirituality, 1 from Other and 1 from Buddhism.
