= Trenčianske Jastrabie =

- Municipality
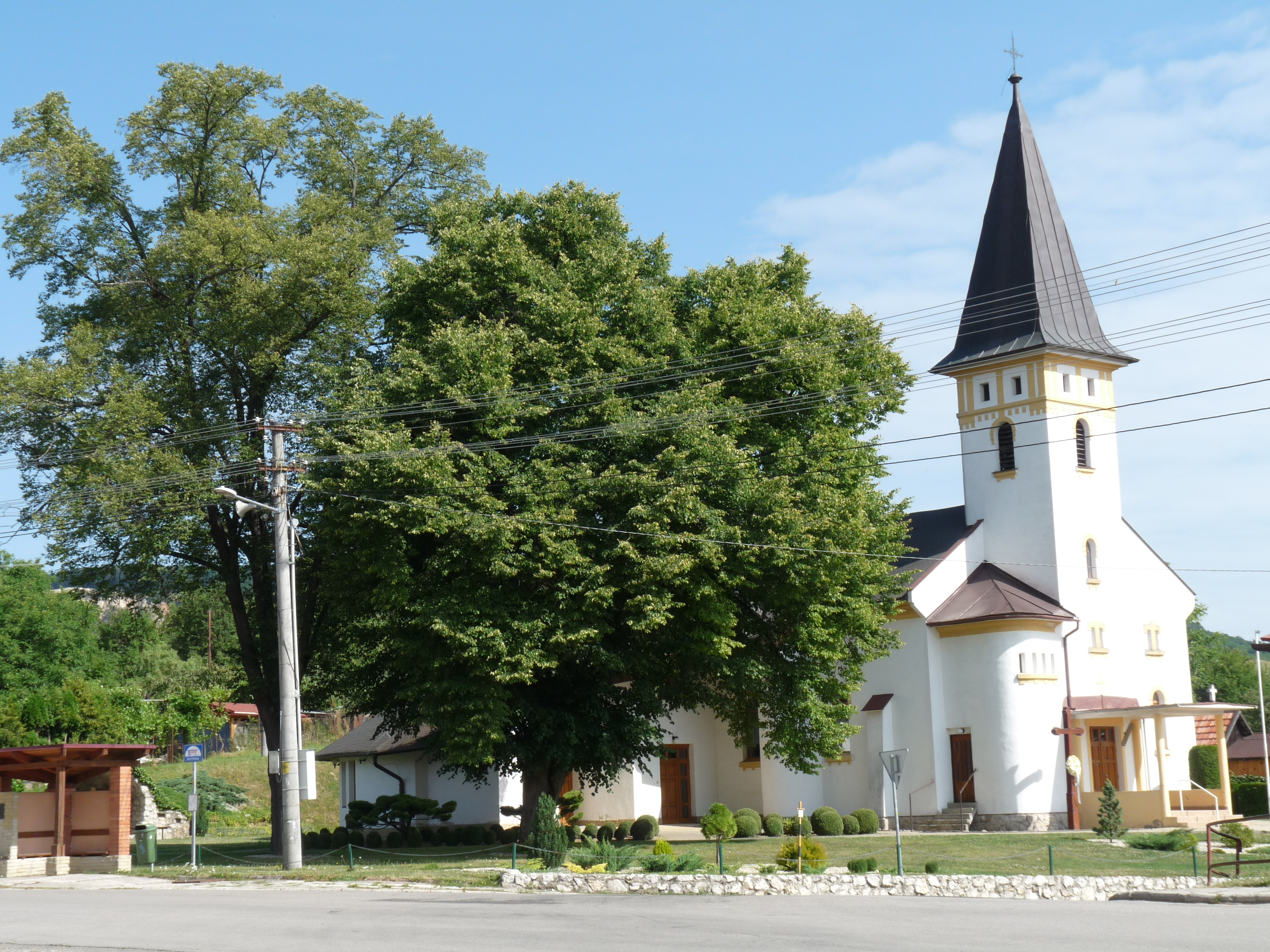

- Flag

- Location of Trenčianske Jastrabie in the Trenčín Region Location of Trenčianske Jastrabie in Slovakia
- Coordinates: 48.80°N 18.12°E
- Country: Slovakia
- Region: Trenčín Region
- District: Trenčín District
- First mentioned: 1269

Area
  - Total: 12.25 km^{2} (4.73 sq mi)
- Elevation: 284 m (932 ft)

Population (2025)
  - Total: 1,416
- Time zone: UTC+1 (CET)
  - Summer (DST): UTC+2 (CEST)
- Postal code: 913 22
- Area code: +421 32
- Vehicle registration plate (until 2022): TN
- Website: www.trencianskejastrabie.sk

Trenčianske Jastrabie (Hungarian: Ölved) is a village and municipality in Trenčín District in the Trenčín Region of northwestern Slovakia.

== Names and etymology ==
The name comes from Slovak Jastrab (hawk). Jastrabie (1439 Jaztreby) — a place with many hawks and/or a place where hawks are trained for falconry. Former official Slovak names were also Jastrabie pod Inovcom, Jastrabie pri Trenčíne, since 1946 Trenčianske Jastrabie.

== History ==
The village was first mentioned in historical records in 1269.

== Geography ==
The municipality lies at an altitude of 284 metres (932 ft) and covers an area of 12.25 km^{2} (4.73 sq mi) (2025).

== Population ==
Population statistic (10 years)
Year	1995	2005	2015	2025
Count	1219	1214	1212	1416
Difference		−0.41%	−0.16%	+16.83%

Population statistic
Year	2024	2025
Count	1391	1416
Difference		+1.79%

It has a population of 1416 people (31 December 2025).

=== Ethnicity ===
Census 2021 (1+ %)
Ethnicity	Number	Fraction
Slovak	1238	98.88%
Not found out	16	1.27%
Czech	14	1.11%
Total	1252	

In year 2021 was 1252 people by ethnicity 1238 as Slovak, 16 as Not found out, 14 as Czech, 2 as Other, 1 as Irish, 1 as Ukrainian, 1 as Moravian and 1 as English.

Note on population: The difference values of population numbers in the table "Population statistic" and in the sections "Ethnicity" & "Religion" is caused by the use of various statistical methods.

=== Religion ===
Census 2021 (1+ %)
Religion	Number	Fraction
Roman Catholic Church	1022	81.63%
None	163	13.02%
Not found out	27	2.16%
Greek Catholic Church	17	1.36%
Total	1252	

In year 2021 was 1252 people by religion 1022 from Roman Catholic Church, 163 from None, 27 from Not found out, 17 from Greek Catholic Church, 7 from Evangelical Church, 5 from Ad hoc movements, 2 from Jehovah's Witnesses, 2 from Christian Congregations in Slovakia, 2 from Other, 1 from Calvinist Church, 1 from Eastern Orthodox Church, 1 from Other and not ascertained christian church, 1 from Islam and 1 from Buddhism.
