= Trenčianske Stankovce =

- Municipality
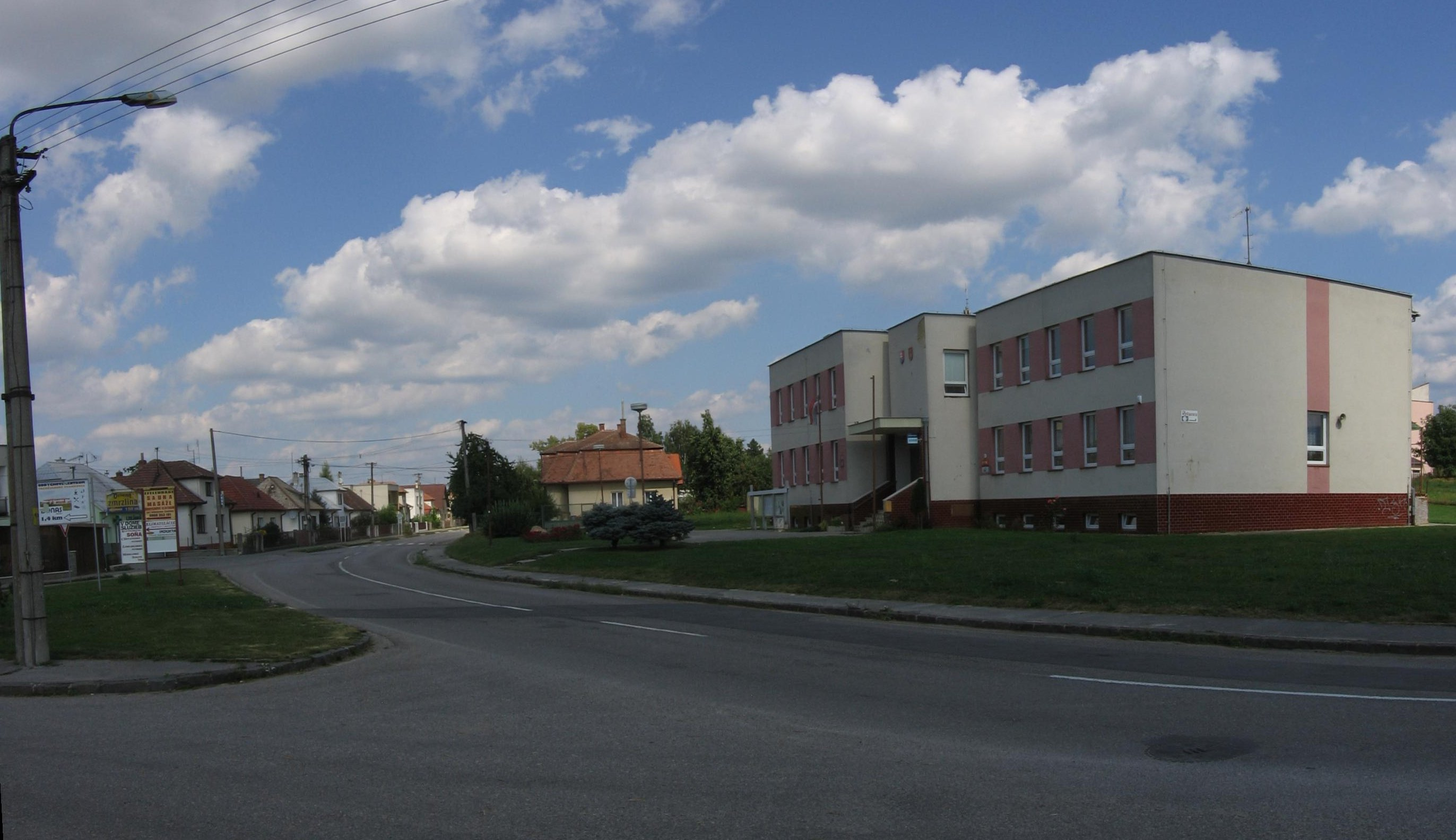

- Flag

- Location of Trenčianske Stankovce in the Trenčín Region Location of Trenčianske Stankovce in Slovakia
- Coordinates: 48.84°N 17.98°E
- Country: Slovakia
- Region: Trenčín Region
- District: Trenčín District
- First mentioned: 1345

Government
  - Mayor: Martin Markech (Ind.)

Area
  - Total: 24.49 km^{2} (9.46 sq mi)
- Elevation: 208 m (682 ft)

Population (2025)
  - Total: 3,402
- Time zone: UTC+1 (CET)
  - Summer (DST): UTC+2 (CEST)
- Postal code: 913 11
- Area code: +421 32
- Vehicle registration plate (until 2022): TN
- Website: www.trencianskestankovce.sk

Trenčianske Stankovce (Hungarian: Trencsénsztankóc) is a village and municipality in Trenčín District in the Trenčín Region of north-western Slovakia.

== Geography ==
The municipality lies at an altitude of 208 metres (682 ft) and covers an area of 24.49 km^{2} (9.46 sq mi) (2025).

== Population ==
Population statistic (10 years)
Year	1995	2005	2015	2025
Count	2679	3078	3203	3402
Difference		+14.89%	+4.06%	+6.21%

Population statistic
Year	2024	2025
Count	3404	3402
Difference		−0.05%

It has a population of 3402 people (31 December 2025).

=== Ethnicity ===
Census 2021 (1+ %)
Ethnicity	Number	Fraction
Slovak	3303	97.06%
Not found out	69	2.02%
Czech	36	1.05%
Total	3403	

In year 2021 was 3403 people by ethnicity 3303 as Slovak, 69 as Not found out, 36 as Czech, 8 as Other, 6 as Polish, 4 as Russian, 4 as Hungarian, 2 as Moravian, 2 as English, 1 as Jewish, 1 as Italian, 1 as Serbian, 1 as Romani, 1 as Rusyn, 1 as German and 1 as Croatian.

Note on population: The difference values of population numbers in the table "Population statistic" and in the sections "Ethnicity" & "Religion" is caused by the use of various statistical methods.

=== Religion ===
Census 2021 (1+ %)
Religion	Number	Fraction
Roman Catholic Church	1778	52.25%
Evangelical Church	824	24.21%
None	640	18.81%
Not found out	90	2.64%
Total	3403	

In year 2021 was 3403 people by religion 1778 from Roman Catholic Church, 824 from Evangelical Church, 640 from None, 90 from Not found out, 20 from Greek Catholic Church, 16 from Christian Congregations in Slovakia, 9 from Ad hoc movements, 6 from Other, 5 from Islam, 4 from Paganism and natural spirituality, 2 from Buddhism, 2 from Baptists Church, 1 from Jewish community, 1 from Eastern Orthodox Church, 1 from Other and not ascertained christian church, 1 from Jehovah's Witnesses, 1 from United Methodist Church, 1 from Czechoslovak Hussite Church and 1 from Apostolic Church.
