= Neporadza, Trenčín District =

Neporadza
- Municipality
- Flag

- Location of Neporadza in the Trenčín Region Location of Neporadza in Slovakia
- Coordinates: 48°49′20″N 18°09′15″E
- Country: Slovakia
- Region: Trenčín Region
- District: Trenčín District
- First mentioned: 1269

Area
  - Total: 14.21 km^{2} (5.49 sq mi)
- Elevation: 286 m (938 ft)

Population (2025)
  - Total: 791
- Time zone: UTC+1 (CET)
  - Summer (DST): UTC+2 (CEST)
- Postal code: 913 26
- Area code: +421 32
- Vehicle registration plate (until 2022): TN
- Website: www.neporadza.sk

Neporadza (Hungarian: Neporác) is a village and municipality in Trenčín District in the Trenčín Region of north-western Slovakia.

== History ==
Historical records first mention the village in 1269.

== Geography ==
The municipality lies at an altitude of 286 metres (938 ft) and covers an area of 14.21 km^{2} (5.49 sq mi) (2025).

== Population ==
Population statistic (10 years)
Year	1995	2005	2015	2025
Count	828	768	796	791
Difference		−7.24%	+3.64%	−0.62%

Population statistic
Year	2024	2025
Count	802	791
Difference		−1.37%

It has a population of 791 people (31 December 2025).

=== Ethnicity ===
Census 2021 (1+ %)
Ethnicity	Number	Fraction
Slovak	774	98.85%
Total	783	

In year 2021 was 783 people by ethnicity 774 as Slovak, 6 as Not found out, 5 as Czech, 5 as Russian, 1 as German, 1 as Hungarian and 1 as Other.

Note on population: The difference values of population numbers in the table "Population statistic" and in the sections "Ethnicity" & "Religion" is caused by the use of various statistical methods.

=== Religion ===
Census 2021 (1+ %)
Religion	Number	Fraction
Roman Catholic Church	658	84.04%
None	89	11.37%
Not found out	10	1.28%
Evangelical Church	8	1.02%
Total	783	

In year 2021 was 783 people by religion 658 from Roman Catholic Church, 89 from None, 10 from Not found out, 8 from Evangelical Church, 5 from Greek Catholic Church, 3 from Eastern Orthodox Church, 3 from Christian Congregations in Slovakia, 2 from Other, 2 from Ad hoc movements, 1 from Calvinist Church, 1 from Paganism and natural spirituality and 1 from Jehovah's Witnesses.
