= Mikuláš Jozef Lexmann =

Catholic priest (1899–1952)

- Born: 28 October 1899; Bobot, Austria-Hungary
- Died: 17 July 1952; Hora Matky Boží, Czechoslovakia

Mikuláš Jozef Lexmann, OP (28 October 1899 – 17 July 1952) was a Slovak Catholic priest, one of the most important figures of the Dominican Order in Slovakia.

He was an active man of wide interests, a pioneer of driving and a pilot. During World War II, Lexmann was hiding people in danger of their life in the crypt of the Dominican Church in Košice, and is thus registered among those who rescued Jews at the Holocaust Memorial Center in Budapest. At the beginning of the 1950s, he was interned by the communist government in several monasteries, where harsh living conditions deteriorated his health and hastened his death. Lexmann belonged to the martyrs of the Dominican Order of the 20th century. In 2013, the Slovak province of the Order approved to initiate a process of his beatification.

== Early life ==
Jozef Lexmann was born as the first of eight children; his father was a craftsman and his lay Dominican mother had a drapery business with was pious. Four of her children eventually chose religious life: Apart from Jozef, his brother Gregor and sister Mary joined the Dominicans, and sister Brigita became a member of the Congregation of Teaching Sisters of Notre Dame.

Lexmann went to the elementary school in Bobot and continued his studies in Bánovce nad Bebravou. He joined the Dominican juvenate in 1909. From 1912 to 1916, Lexmann studied at a grammar school in Budapest. He entered the Dominican Order in Graz and adopted the religious name Mikuláš (Nicholas) in 1917. He finished his novitiate and graduated in philosophy and theology in Graz and Vienna. He received priestly ordination on 29 July 1923. The following year, Lexmann began to work in the Dominican priory in Košice. On 4 July 1933 he became its superior.

== The first flying monk ==
Apart from all of his duties, Lexmann was interested in technical innovations. He became the first priest to hold a driving license in Košice and used to drive there in 1920s. Using a rental car, Lexmann ran a driving course for the unemployed and the poor. He was an executive director of the Autoclub for Eastern Slovakia. He also completed a pilot course in 1935, becoming the first priest-pilot in Czechoslovakia. He dropped a wreath of flowers from his plane in front of the Dominican church in Kosice for his brother Rafael's first Holy Mass. He was also Mayor of the Orol (a Christian Sports Association) He founded the Veritas Cultural Center in the city. Photography and filming were among his hobbies.

Lexmann was assigned by his superiors to Znojmo in 1936 and enrolled at Masaryk University in Brno. He continued his studies at Charles University in Prague in 1937, but did not finish his studies due to the threat of being arrested by the Gestapo. As a result, Lexmann fled to a monastery in Sopron and was assigned to Vasvar.

== Saving lives ==
Lexmann returned to Košice in 1944, after which he hid several people from the terror of the Arrow Cross Party saved their lives in the crypt of the Dominican Crunch until 1945. Therefore, Lexmann was registered at the Holocaust Memorial Center in Budapest as one of those who rescued the Jews during the War.

== Other activities ==
He founded Cyril-Methodian Scouting with the Order of Peachers. He founded the Holy Rosary magazine in Košice in 1946. He also learnt Esperanto and organized its courses. In 1948, Lexmann participated in organizing a congress of Slovak Esperanto students in Košice worked there as a monastery librarian, catechist or preacher of retreats.

== Interrogations and internment ==
Lexmann experienced his first interrogation at the Košice headquarters of the StB (Secret Service) in December 1947. On 20 February 1948, he was arrested for one month due to his contacts with Julius Patúc, who was accused of establishing an illegal organization Slovak National League, directed against communism. Lexmann was also mentioned in the investigation of the activities of Rodina founded by Croatian priest Tomislav Kolaković. Later that year, he published a statement in his magazine, saying “We need priests who, with a rosary in one hand and a cross in the other, fight for the rights of Christ and are not deterred by prison, adversity, or threats, but are ready to undergo martyrdom for Christ, like the apostles.” Despite StB's pressure, on 17 June 1949, he read during a Holy Mass a pastoral letter written by the secret bishops' conference in Prague.

In April 1950, Lexmann was arrested and transported from Košice during the Akcia K and transferred to internment monasteries in Pezinok, Báč and Podolínec. On 29 November 1950, he was considered officially as a "reactionary and incorrigible" religious and transferred to the monastery in Králíky. In the internment monasteries, living conditions were generally very harsh. In Králíky, Lexmann had already serious heart problems, high blood pressure and breathing difficulties.

== Death and legacy ==
Lexmann died of stroke on 17 July 1952 at the age of 52 and was buried in his native village of Bobot. He Lexmann was included on the international list of Dominican martyrs of the 20th century. In 2013, the Slovak province of Dominicans approved the initiation of the process of his beatification.

In 2012, a memorial plaque was placed at the front of the church at Bobot where he was buried.

On August 16, 2013, a memorial plaque was placed at the front of the “Veritas” Cultural Center in Košice.
