= Trenčianske Teplice =

- Municipality
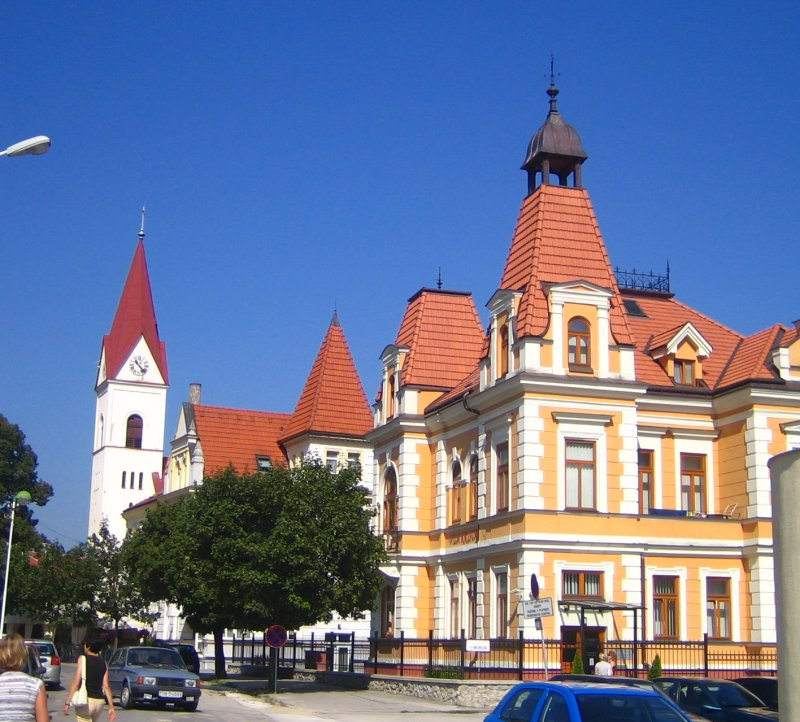
- Town centre

- Flag Coat of arms

- Location of Trenčianske Teplice in the Trenčín Region Location of Trenčianske Teplice in Slovakia
- Coordinates: 48.91°N 18.17°E
- Country: Slovakia
- Region: Trenčín Region
- District: Trenčín District
- First mentioned: 1379

Government
  - Mayor: Zuzana Frajková Ďurmeková

Area
  - Total: 16.23 km^{2} (6.27 sq mi)
- Elevation: 276 m (906 ft)

Population (2025)
  - Total: 3,925
- Time zone: UTC+1 (CET)
  - Summer (DST): UTC+2 (CEST)
- Postal code: 914 51
- Area code: +421 32
- Vehicle registration plate (until 2022): TN
- Website: www.teplice.sk

Trenčianske Teplice (German: Trentschin-Teplitz; Hungarian: Trencsénteplic) is a health resort and small spa town in western Slovakia, in the valley of the river Teplička, at the foothills of the Strážovské vrchy mountains, a few kilometres away from the city of Trenčín.

== Characteristics ==
The town of Trenčianske Teplice is known not only for its thermal springs and the health resorts, but also for an international film festival Art film and the Bridge of Fame. Not far from the town is also a small village Motešice, known very well for horse-breeding farm and horse racing. 'Green Frog' is a name for sport/recreational complex, very popular by locals, which was renovated and reopened in 2015.

== Geography ==
The municipality lies at an altitude of 276 metres (906 ft) and covers an area of 16.23 km^{2} (6.27 sq mi) (2025).

== Legend ==
A legend says that the healing springs were discovered by a gammy shepherd while he was looking for a lost sheep. He found a small hot water pool with a sulphuric smell and after several days, he recovered.

== History ==
In the middle of the 13th century as terra Teplicza, it was property of the Cseszneky de Milvány family. It has been a spa site since the 14th century. As early as the 16th century, the spa was known all over Europe, and was mentioned as the most important of the Kingdom of Hungary. The spa was owned by the Illésházy, an aristocratic family of the Kingdom of Hungary, from 1582 onwards. In 1835, it was bought by the Viennese financier Jozef Sina, who developed the area. The spa was nationalised after the Second World War.

== Artfilm ==
Film festival Art Film Fest was held for first time 1993, the year when "Slovak republic" was founded. Artfilm is the longest active international film related festival in Slovakia. The festival was founded by "Peter Hledik", who is also the director. As Mr. Hledik said, the reason for founding the festival was affected by the time, early 90s. The time when film studios in Slovakia had significant financial problems and they stopped filming. Artfilm wanted to replace live cinematography. The first years of the festival begins 14 June 1993 in Trenčianske Teplice with "UNESCO" support. It was a small review of documentary movies in one cinema hall for just 200 people. By the time, festival has been growing and has become one of the most iconic cultural events in Slovakia. While in 1993 the festival welcomed just 300 visitors, in 2009 it was 25 000 visitors. Due to increased demand, in 2016 the event was moved from Trenčianske Teplice to the second biggest city in Slovakia Košice.

== Carpathian Jewel ==
Long before the era of the film festival was kicked off, Trenčianske Teplice became famous as a spa resort. The town is nested amid nature in the Teplicka Valley, and due to its location and healing springs, it was given a Romanic attribute – 'Carpatian Jewel'. When lords of Trenčin Castle learned about this natural jewel in the past, they chose to protect and aggrandise it. Palatine Štefan Zápoľský in the 16th century laid the foundation stone of what later became the spa resort area. The spa is open year-round, and is visited by people looking for a cure for diseases of locomotive organs and nervous system. The resort lies in a natural environment protected against wind and frequently has sunny days. Traditional curative methods have been joined by the modern methods of comprehensive balneotherapy. This features the use of curative effects of thermal mineral springs along with healing effects of mineralised mud. Thermal water rises from the depth of around 1200 meters, and before it comes out on the surface, it flows through limy soil and layers of magnesium, which results in its intense mineralization and warming. Other than the healing springs, visitors to the spa have a chance to see an architecture of the own of Trenčianske Teplice. The most popular is a bath called hammam, which can be taken in a spa house called Sina. The house is decorated in an Oriental (Arabic/Moorish) style of late 19th century. The surroundings of the spa houses are glamorised by a Romantic English park with a small pond.

A hydroelectric power station (it was producing polyphase AC of 5250 V) was built between 1886 and 1888 and supplied the town's streetlights as well as surrounding communities (Trenčianska Teplá, Košeca, Ladce) with electricity. It also powered a special narrow-gauged public electric railway opened on 29 July 1909. The railway has a length of 5.9 km (4 mi) and connects Trenčianske Teplice with a railway junction at Trenčianska Teplá. Regular service on the railway was discontinued, seasonal trains still operate.

== Sport ==
Slovak Bandy Association has its seat in Trenčianske Teplice.

== Population ==
Population statistic (10 years)
Year	1995	2005	2015	2025
Count	4604	4309	4178	3925
Difference		−6.40%	−3.04%	−6.05%

Population statistic
Year	2024	2025
Count	3909	3925
Difference		+0.40%

It has a population of 3925 people (31 December 2025).

=== Ethnicity ===
Census 2021 (1+%)
Ethnicity	Number	Fraction
Slovak	3671	92.23%
Not found out	250	6.28%
Czech	54	1.35%
Total	3980	

In year 2021 was 3980 people by ethnicity 3671 as Slovak, 250 as Not found out, 54 as Czech, 31 as Other, 18 as Romani, 11 as Hungarian, 10 as German, 8 as Italian, 7 as Serbian, 7 as Russian, 5 as Ukrainian, 5 as Polish, 5 as Moravian, 4 as Chinese, 4 as Rusyn, 3 as Austrian, 3 as Greek, 3 as English, 2 as French, 2 as Croatian, 1 as Vietnamese and 1 as Canadian.

Note on population: The difference values of population numbers in the table "Population statistic" and in the sections "Ethnicity" & "Religion" is caused by the use of various statistical methods.

=== Religion ===
Census 2021 (1+%)
Religion	Number	Fraction
Roman Catholic Church	2345	58.92%
None	1071	26.91%
Not found out	305	7.66%
Evangelical Church	145	3.64%
Total	3980	

In year 2021 was 3980 people by religion 2345 from Roman Catholic Church, 1071 from None, 305 from Not found out, 145 from Evangelical Church, 21 from Greek Catholic Church, 20 from Other, 17 from Eastern Orthodox Church, 10 from Islam, 10 from Buddhism, 10 from Apostolic Church, 8 from Ad hoc movements, 7 from Christian Congregations in Slovakia, 4 from Other and not ascertained christian church, 2 from Old Catholic Church, 2 from Calvinist Church, 2 from Paganism and natural spirituality and 1 from Jehovah's Witnesses.

According to the 2001 census, the town had 4,438 inhabitants. 96.6% of inhabitants were Slovaks, 1.7% Czechs and 0.2% Hungarians. The religious makeup was 77.7% Roman Catholics, 13.6% people with no religious affiliation, and 4.6% Lutherans.

== Twin towns – sister cities ==
Trenčianske Teplice is twinned with:

- Aschersleben, Germany
- Tuzla, Turkey
- Vsetín, Czech Republic
- Wilamowice, Poland

== Gallery ==
Spa pool hall with a domed lantern, between 1890 and 1921, photo by Rudolf Bruner-Dvořák

Bathers in a spa pool, between 1890 and 1921, photo by Rudolf Bruner-Dvořák
