= Kameničany =

- Municipality
- Flag

- Location of Kameničany in the Trenčín Region Location of Kameničany in Slovakia
- Coordinates: 48.99°N 18.17°E
- Country: Slovakia
- Region: Trenčín Region
- District: Ilava District
- First mentioned: 1193

Area
  - Total: 5.07 km^{2} (1.96 sq mi)
- Elevation: 233 m (764 ft)

Population (2025)
  - Total: 553
- Time zone: UTC+1 (CET)
  - Summer (DST): UTC+2 (CEST)
- Postal code: 185 4
- Area code: +421 42
- Vehicle registration plate (until 2022): IL
- Website: www.kamenicany.sk

Kameničany (Hungarian: Köveskő) is a village and municipality in Ilava District in the Trenčín Region of north-western Slovakia.

== History ==
In historical records the village was first mentioned in 1193.

== Geography ==
The municipality lies at an altitude of 233 metres (764 ft) and covers an area of 5.07 km^{2} (1.96 sq mi) (2025).

== Population ==
Population statistic (10 years)
Year	1995	2005	2015	2025
Count	441	469	545	553
Difference		+6.34%	+16.20%	+1.46%

Population statistic
Year	2024	2025
Count	550	553
Difference		+0.54%

It has a population of 553 people (31 December 2025).

=== Ethnicity ===
Census 2021 (1+ %)
Ethnicity	Number	Fraction
Slovak	555	98.57%
Not found out	8	1.42%
Total	563	

In year 2021 was 563 people by ethnicity 555 as Slovak, 8 as Not found out, 3 as Czech, 3 as Other, 1 as Polish and 1 as English.

Note on population: The difference values of population numbers in the table "Population statistic" and in the sections "Ethnicity" & "Religion" is caused by the use of various statistical methods.

=== Religion ===
Census 2021 (1+ %)
Religion	Number	Fraction
Roman Catholic Church	484	85.97%
None	64	11.37%
Not found out	9	1.6%
Total	563	

In year 2021 was 563 people by religion 484 from Roman Catholic Church, 64 from None, 9 from Not found out, 3 from Evangelical Church, 1 from Calvinist Church, 1 from Jehovah's Witnesses and 1 from Christian Congregations in Slovakia.

== Genealogical resources ==
The records for genealogical research are available at the state archive "Statny Archiv in Bratislava, Bytca, Slovakia"

- Roman Catholic church records (births/marriages/deaths): 1700-1896 (parish B)
- Lutheran church records (births/marriages/deaths): 1783-1895 (parish B)

== See also ==
- List of municipalities and towns in Slovakia
