= Slavnica =

- Municipality
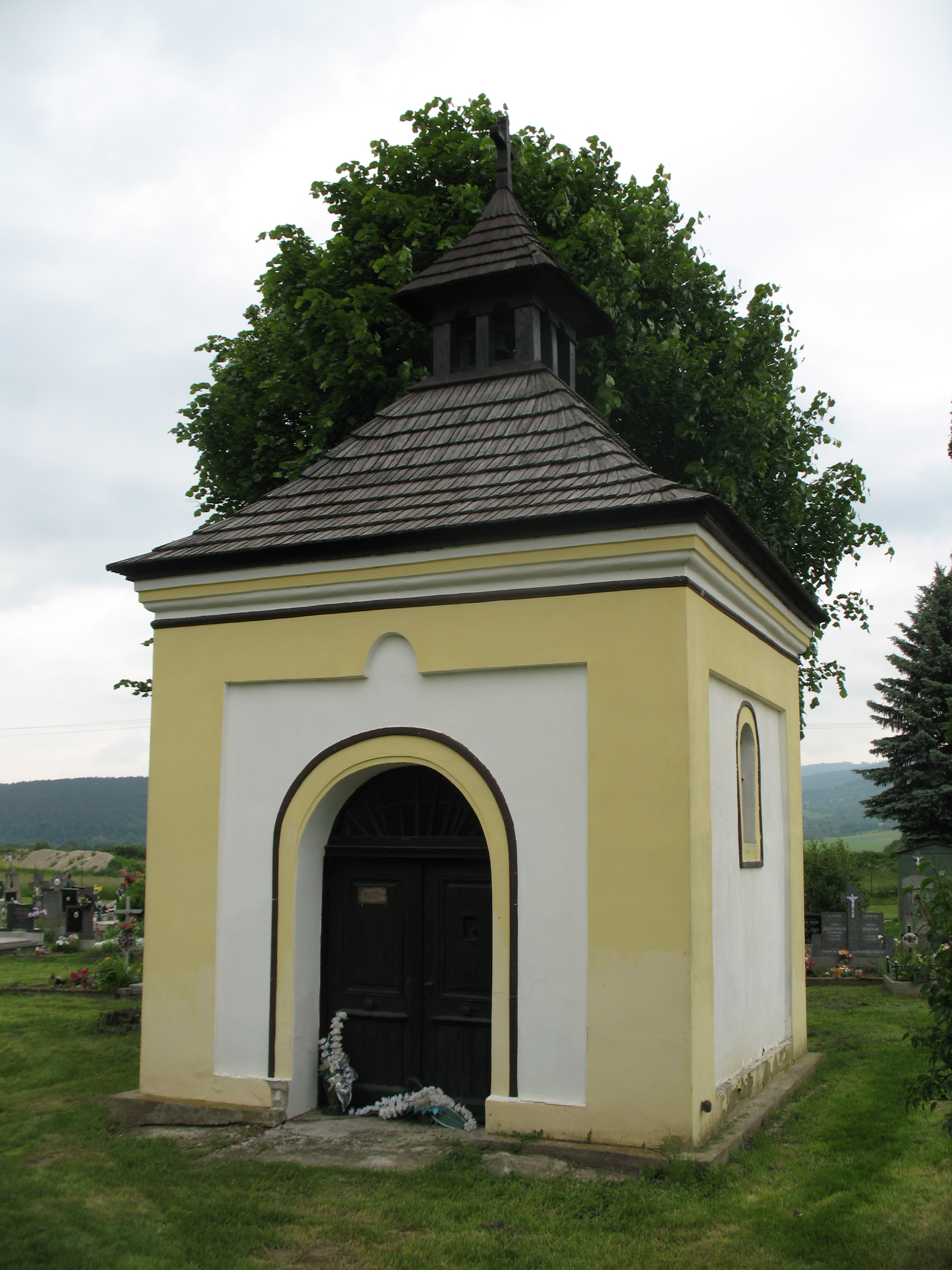

- Location of Slavnica in the Trenčín Region Location of Slavnica in Slovakia
- Coordinates: 49.00°N 18.18°E
- Country: Slovakia
- Region: Trenčín Region
- District: Ilava District
- First mentioned: 1379

Government
  - Mayor: Anna Prekopová (KDH)

Area
  - Total: 7.81 km^{2} (3.02 sq mi)
- Elevation: 295 m (968 ft)

Population (2025)
  - Total: 869
- Time zone: UTC+1 (CET)
  - Summer (DST): UTC+2 (CEST)
- Postal code: 185 4
- Area code: +421 42
- Vehicle registration plate (until 2022): IL
- Website: www.slavnica.sk

Slavnica (Hungarian: Szalonca) is a village and municipality in Ilava District in the Trenčín Region of north-western Slovakia.

== History ==
In historical records the village was first mentioned in 1379.

== Geography ==
The municipality lies at an altitude of 295 metres (968 ft) and covers an area of 7.81 km^{2} (3.02 sq mi) (2025).

== Population ==
Population statistic (10 years)
Year	1995	2005	2015	2025
Count	843	814	839	869
Difference		−3.44%	+3.07%	+3.57%

Population statistic
Year	2024	2025
Count	864	869
Difference		+0.57%

It has a population of 869 people (31 December 2025).

=== Ethnicity ===
Census 2021 (1+ %)
Ethnicity	Number	Fraction
Slovak	814	98.66%
Total	825	

In year 2021 was 825 people by ethnicity 814 as Slovak, 8 as Not found out, 5 as Czech, 2 as Romani, 2 as French, 1 as Ukrainian, 1 as Russian and 1 as German.

Note on population: The difference values of population numbers in the table "Population statistic" and in the sections "Ethnicity" & "Religion" is caused by the use of various statistical methods.

=== Religion ===
Census 2021 (1+ %)
Religion	Number	Fraction
Roman Catholic Church	693	84%
None	106	12.85%
Evangelical Church	13	1.58%
Total	825	

In year 2021 was 825 people by religion 693 from Roman Catholic Church, 106 from None, 13 from Evangelical Church, 6 from Not found out, 3 from Greek Catholic Church, 1 from Eastern Orthodox Church, 1 from Paganism and natural spirituality, 1 from Jehovah's Witnesses and 1 from Ad hoc movements.
