= Mikušovce =

Mikušovce may refer to:

- Mikušovce in Ilava District
- Mikušovce in Lučenec District
