= Bolešov =

- Municipality
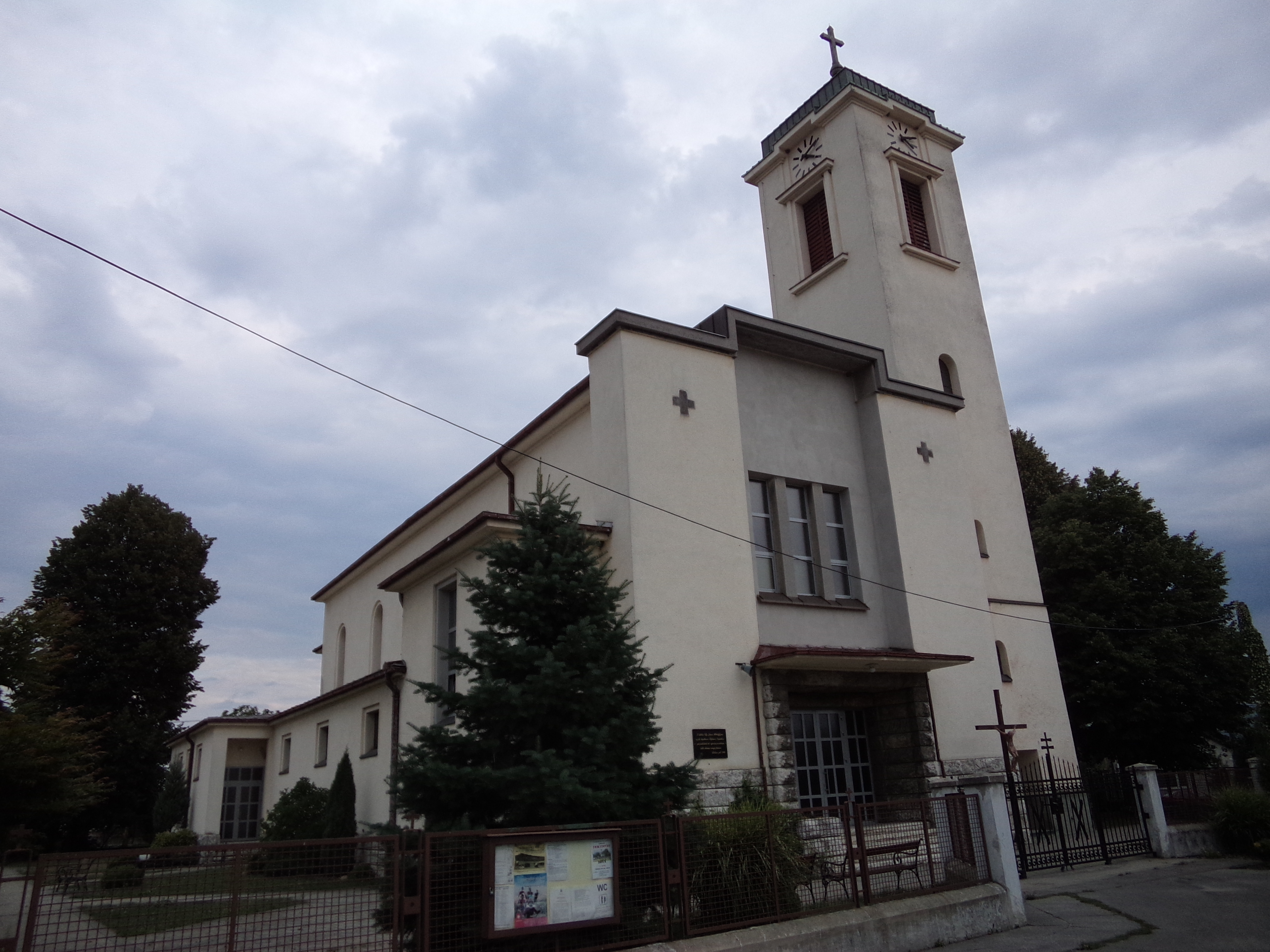

- Flag

- Location of Bolešov in the Trenčín Region Location of Bolešov in Slovakia
- Coordinates: 48.98°N 18.15°E
- Country: Slovakia
- Region: Trenčín Region
- District: Ilava District
- First mentioned: 1331

Area
  - Total: 14.95 km^{2} (5.77 sq mi)
- Elevation: 230 m (750 ft)

Population (2025)
  - Total: 1,618
- Time zone: UTC+1 (CET)
  - Summer (DST): UTC+2 (CEST)
- Postal code: 185 3
- Area code: +421 42
- Vehicle registration plate (until 2022): IL
- Website: www.bolesov.eu

Bolešov (Slovak pronunciation: [ˈbɔleʂɔw]; Hungarian: Bolesó) is a village and municipality in Ilava District in the Trenčín Region of north-western Slovakia.

== History ==
In historical records the village was first mentioned in 1331.

== Geography ==
The municipality lies at an altitude of 230 metres (750 ft) and covers an area of 14.95 km^{2} (5.77 sq mi) (2025).

== Population ==
Population statistic (10 years)
Year	1995	2005	2015	2025
Count	1405	1471	1553	1618
Difference		+4.69%	+5.57%	+4.18%

Population statistic
Year	2024	2025
Count	1584	1618
Difference		+2.14%

It has a population of 1618 people (31 December 2025).

=== Ethnicity ===
Census 2021 (1+ %)
Ethnicity	Number	Fraction
Slovak	1499	97.65%
Not found out	29	1.88%
Total	1535	

In year 2021 was 1535 people by ethnicity 1499 as Slovak, 29 as Not found out, 13 as Czech, 3 as Jewish, 3 as Romani, 3 as Hungarian, 3 as Croatian, 2 as Rusyn, 1 as Austrian and 1 as Moravian.

Note on population: The difference values of population numbers in the table "Population statistic" and in the sections "Ethnicity" & "Religion" is caused by the use of various statistical methods.

=== Religion ===
Census 2021 (1+ %)
Religion	Number	Fraction
Roman Catholic Church	1243	80.98%
None	208	13.55%
Not found out	28	1.82%
Evangelical Church	16	1.04%
Total	1535	

In year 2021 was 1535 people by religion 1243 from Roman Catholic Church, 208 from None, 28 from Not found out, 16 from Evangelical Church, 11 from Other, 11 from Greek Catholic Church, 4 from Other and not ascertained christian church, 4 from Ad hoc movements, 3 from United Methodist Church, 3 from Apostolic Church, 2 from Paganism and natural spirituality, 1 from Jewish community and 1 from Hinduism.

== Genealogical resources ==
The records for genealogical research are available at the state archive "Statny Archiv in Bytca, Slovakia"

- Roman Catholic church records (births/marriages/deaths): 1700-1896 (parish A)

== See also ==
- List of municipalities and towns in Slovakia
