= Sedmerovec =

- Municipality
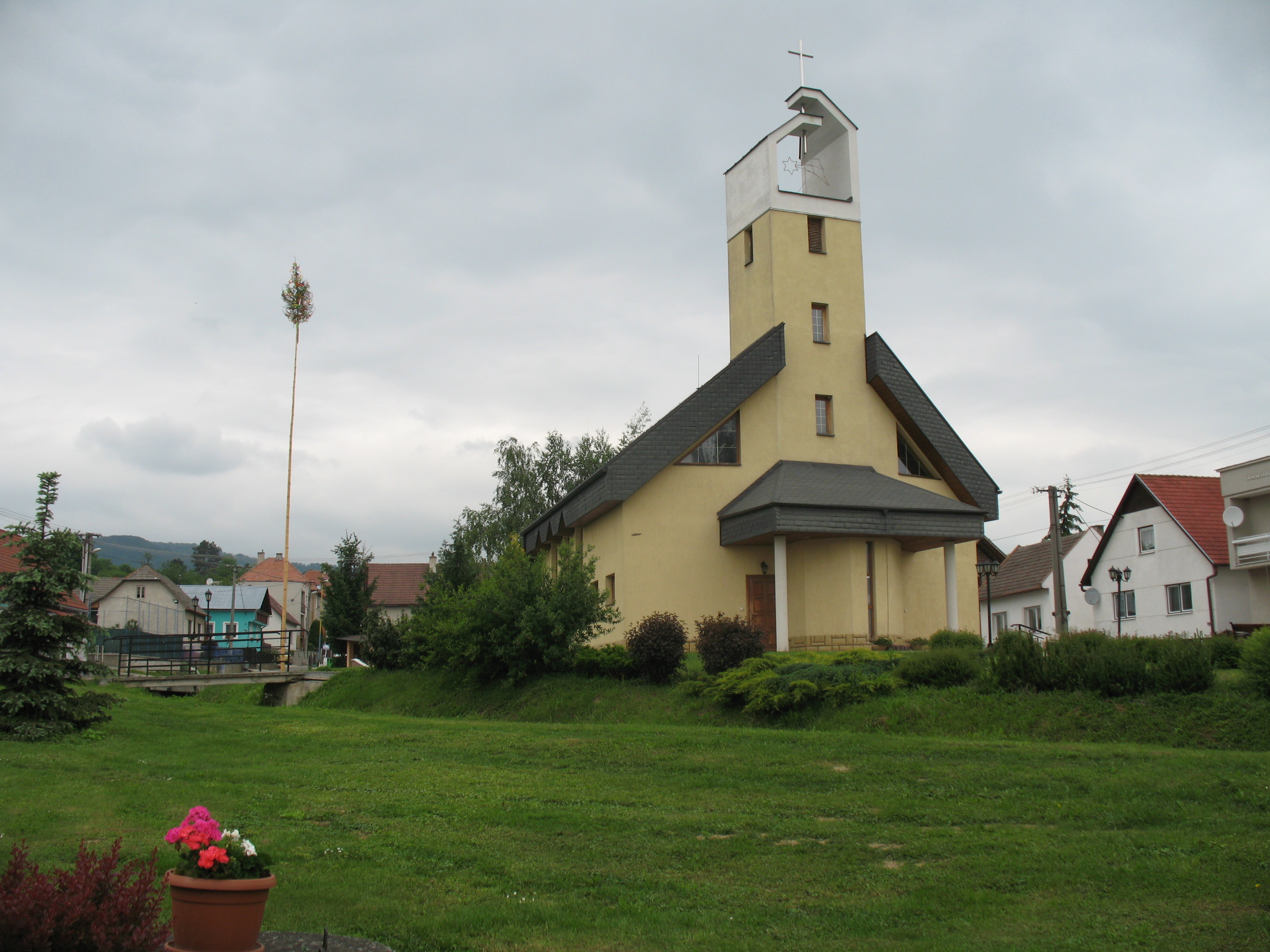

- Flag

- Location of Sedmerovec in the Trenčín Region Location of Sedmerovec in Slovakia
- Coordinates: 49.02°N 18.17°E
- Country: Slovakia
- Region: Trenčín Region
- District: Ilava District
- First mentioned: 1229

Area
  - Total: 6.00 km^{2} (2.32 sq mi)
- Elevation: 244 m (801 ft)

Population (2025)
  - Total: 416
- Time zone: UTC+1 (CET)
  - Summer (DST): UTC+2 (CEST)
- Postal code: 185 4
- Area code: +421 42
- Vehicle registration plate (until 2022): IL
- Website: www.sedmerovec.sk

Sedmerovec (Hungarian: Szedmerőc) is a village and municipality in Ilava District in the Trenčín Region of north-western Slovakia.

== History ==
In historical records the village was first mentioned in 1229.

== Geography ==
The municipality lies at an altitude of 244 metres (801 ft) and covers an area of 6.00 km^{2} (2.32 sq mi) (2025).

== Population ==
Population statistic (10 years)
Year	1995	2005	2015	2025
Count	393	416	429	416
Difference		+5.85%	+3.12%	−3.03%

Population statistic
Year	2024	2025
Count	419	416
Difference		−0.71%

It has a population of 416 people (31 December 2025).

=== Ethnicity ===
Census 2021 (1+ %)
Ethnicity	Number	Fraction
Slovak	423	99.29%
Total	426	

In year 2021 was 426 people by ethnicity 423 as Slovak, 3 as Not found out and 2 as Russian.

Note on population: The difference values of population numbers in the table "Population statistic" and in the sections "Ethnicity" & "Religion" is caused by the use of various statistical methods.

=== Religion ===
Census 2021 (1+ %)
Religion	Number	Fraction
Roman Catholic Church	377	88.5%
None	38	8.92%
Not found out	6	1.41%
Total	426	

In year 2021 was 426 people by religion 377 from Roman Catholic Church, 38 from None, 6 from Not found out, 3 from Christian Congregations in Slovakia, 1 from Greek Catholic Church and 1 from Evangelical Church.
