= Borčice =

- Municipality
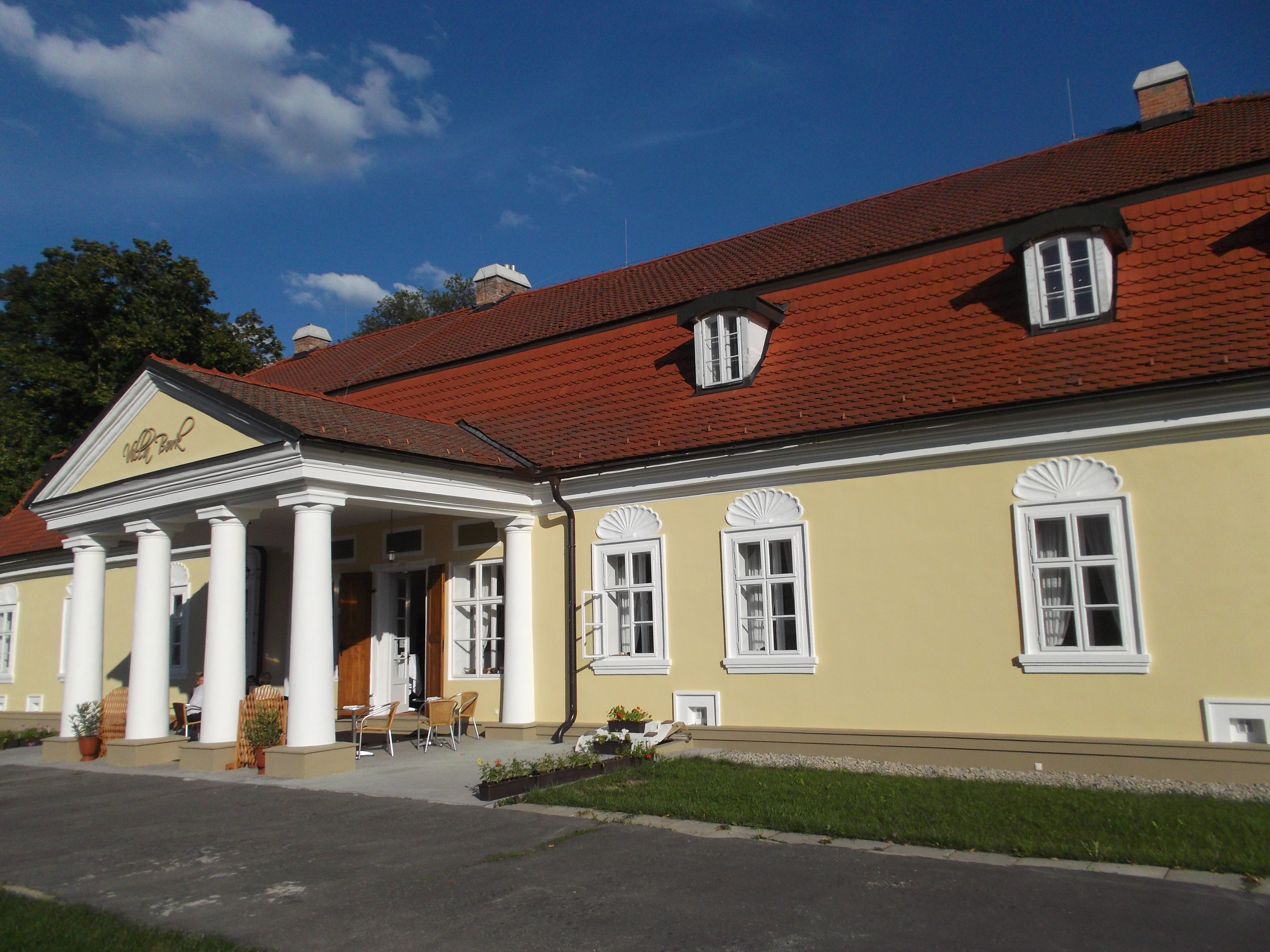

- Flag

- Location of Borčice in the Trenčín Region Location of Borčice in Slovakia
- Coordinates: 48.98°N 18.13°E
- Country: Slovakia
- Region: Trenčín Region
- District: Ilava District
- First mentioned: 1238

Area
  - Total: 4.13 km^{2} (1.59 sq mi)
- Elevation: 228 m (748 ft)

Population (2025)
  - Total: 762
- Time zone: UTC+1 (CET)
  - Summer (DST): UTC+2 (CEST)
- Postal code: 185 3
- Area code: +421 42
- Vehicle registration plate (until 2022): IL
- Website: www.obecborcice.sk

Borčice (Hungarian: Borcsic) is a village and municipality in Ilava District in the Trenčín Region of north-western Slovakia.

== History ==
In historical records the village was first mentioned in 1238.

== Geography ==
The municipality lies at an altitude of 228 metres (748 ft) and covers an area of 4.13 km^{2} (1.59 sq mi) (2025).

== Population ==
Population statistic (10 years)
Year	1995	2005	2015	2025
Count	378	379	560	762
Difference		+0.26%	+47.75%	+36.07%

Population statistic
Year	2024	2025
Count	752	762
Difference		+1.32%

It has a population of 762 people (31 December 2025).

=== Ethnicity ===
Census 2021 (1+ %)
Ethnicity	Number	Fraction
Slovak	672	94.38%
Not found out	37	5.19%
Total	712	

In year 2021 was 712 people by ethnicity 672 as Slovak, 37 as Not found out, 6 as Czech, 5 as Other and 1 as Rusyn.

Note on population: The difference values of population numbers in the table "Population statistic" and in the sections "Ethnicity" & "Religion" is caused by the use of various statistical methods.

=== Religion ===
Census 2021 (1+ %)
Religion	Number	Fraction
Roman Catholic Church	507	71.21%
None	158	22.19%
Not found out	35	4.92%
Total	712	

In year 2021 was 712 people by religion 507 from Roman Catholic Church, 158 from None, 35 from Not found out, 4 from Greek Catholic Church, 3 from Evangelical Church, 3 from Ad hoc movements and 2 from Paganism and natural spirituality.

== Genealogical resources ==
The records for genealogical research are available at the state archive "Statny Archiv in Bytca, Slovakia"

- Roman Catholic church records (births/marriages/deaths): 1705-1896 (parish B)

== See also ==
- List of municipalities and towns in Slovakia
