= Bohunice, Ilava District =

Bohunice
- Municipality
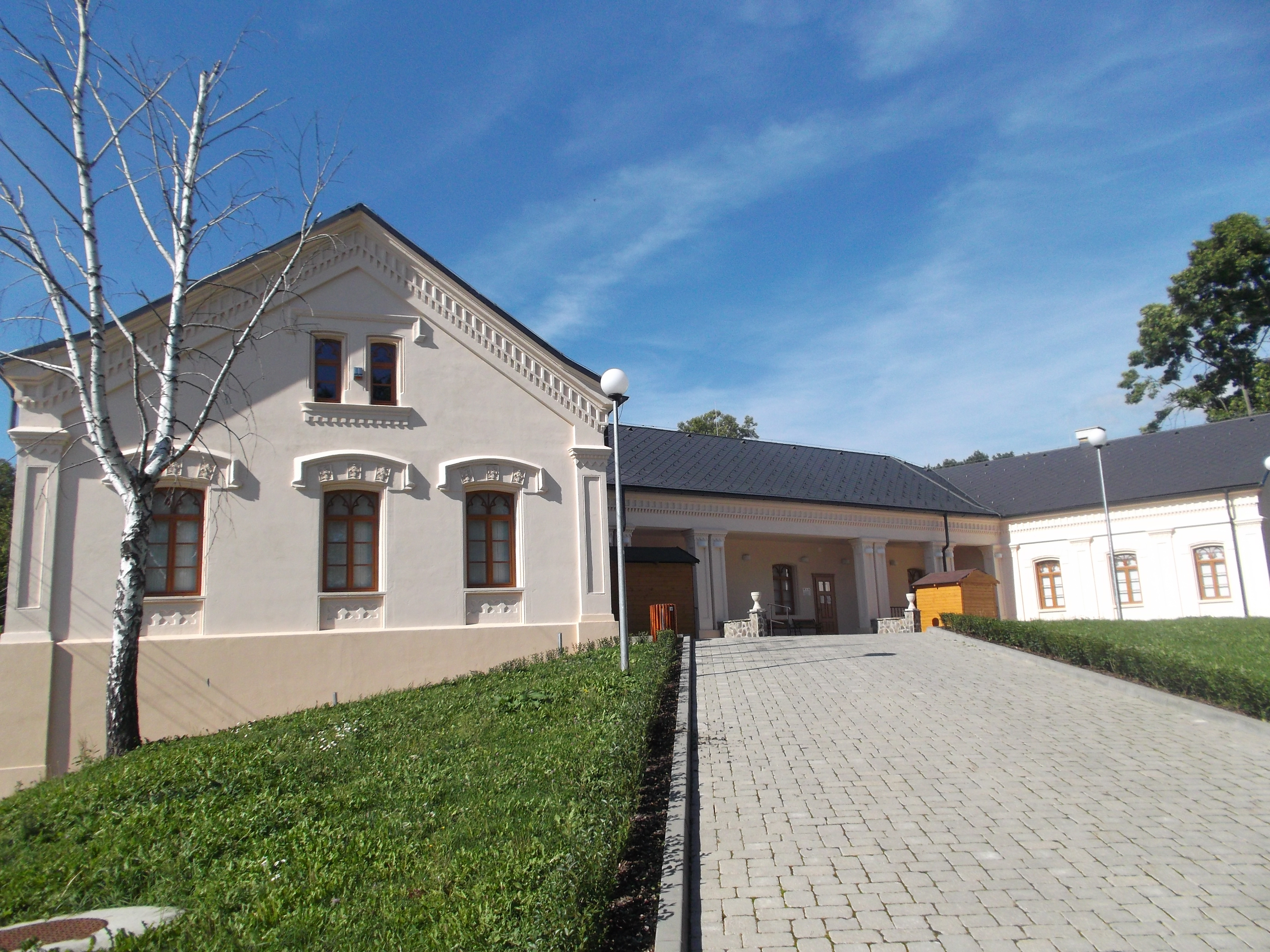

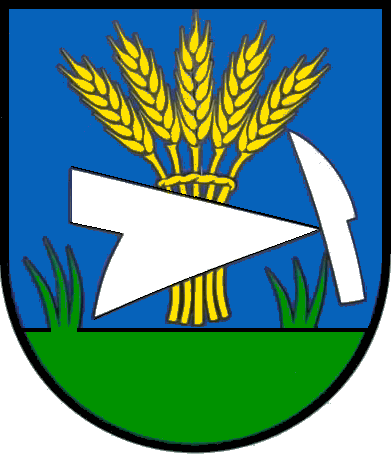
- Flag Coat of arms

- Location of Bohunice in the Trenčín Region Location of Bohunice in Slovakia
- Coordinates: 49°01′12″N 18°11′44″E
- Country: Slovakia
- Region: Trenčín Region
- District: Ilava District
- First mentioned: 1229

Area
  - Total: 0.00 km^{2} (0 sq mi)
- Elevation: 241 m (791 ft)

Population (2025)
  - Total: 775
- Time zone: UTC+1 (CET)
  - Summer (DST): UTC+2 (CEST)
- Postal code: 185 2
- Area code: +421 42
- Vehicle registration plate (until 2022): IL
- Website: www.obecbohunice.sk

Bohunice (Hungarian: Vágbanya) is a village and municipality in Ilava District in the Trenčín Region of north-western Slovakia.

== History ==
In historical records the village was first mentioned in 1229.

== Geography ==
The municipality lies at an altitude of 241 metres (791 ft) and covers an area of 0.00 km^{2} (0 sq mi) (2025).

== Population ==
Population statistic (10 years)
Year	1995	2005	2015	2025
Count	0	745	765	775
Difference		–	+2.68%	+1.30%

Population statistic
Year	2024	2025
Count	785	775
Difference		−1.27%

It has a population of 775 people (31 December 2025).

=== Ethnicity ===
Census 2021 (1+ %)
Ethnicity	Number	Fraction
Slovak	766	99.09%
Total	773	

In year 2021 was 773 people by ethnicity 766 as Slovak, 6 as Not found out, 5 as Czech, 3 as Other, 2 as Romani, 2 as Hungarian and 1 as Russian.

Note on population: The difference values of population numbers in the table "Population statistic" and in the sections "Ethnicity" & "Religion" is caused by the use of various statistical methods.

=== Religion ===
Census 2021 (1+ %)
Religion	Number	Fraction
Roman Catholic Church	670	86.68%
None	79	10.22%
Not found out	9	1.16%
Total	773	

In year 2021 was 773 people by religion 670 from Roman Catholic Church, 79 from None, 9 from Not found out, 6 from Greek Catholic Church, 3 from Christian Congregations in Slovakia, 2 from Ad hoc movements, 1 from Eastern Orthodox Church, 1 from Paganism and natural spirituality, 1 from Church of Jesus Christ of Latter-day Saints and 1 from Buddhism.

== Genealogical resources ==
The records for genealogical research are available at the state archive "Statny Archiv in Bratislava, Slovakia"

- Roman Catholic church records (births/marriages/deaths): 1768-1896 (parish A)

== See also ==
- List of municipalities and towns in Slovakia
