= Horná Poruba =

- Municipality
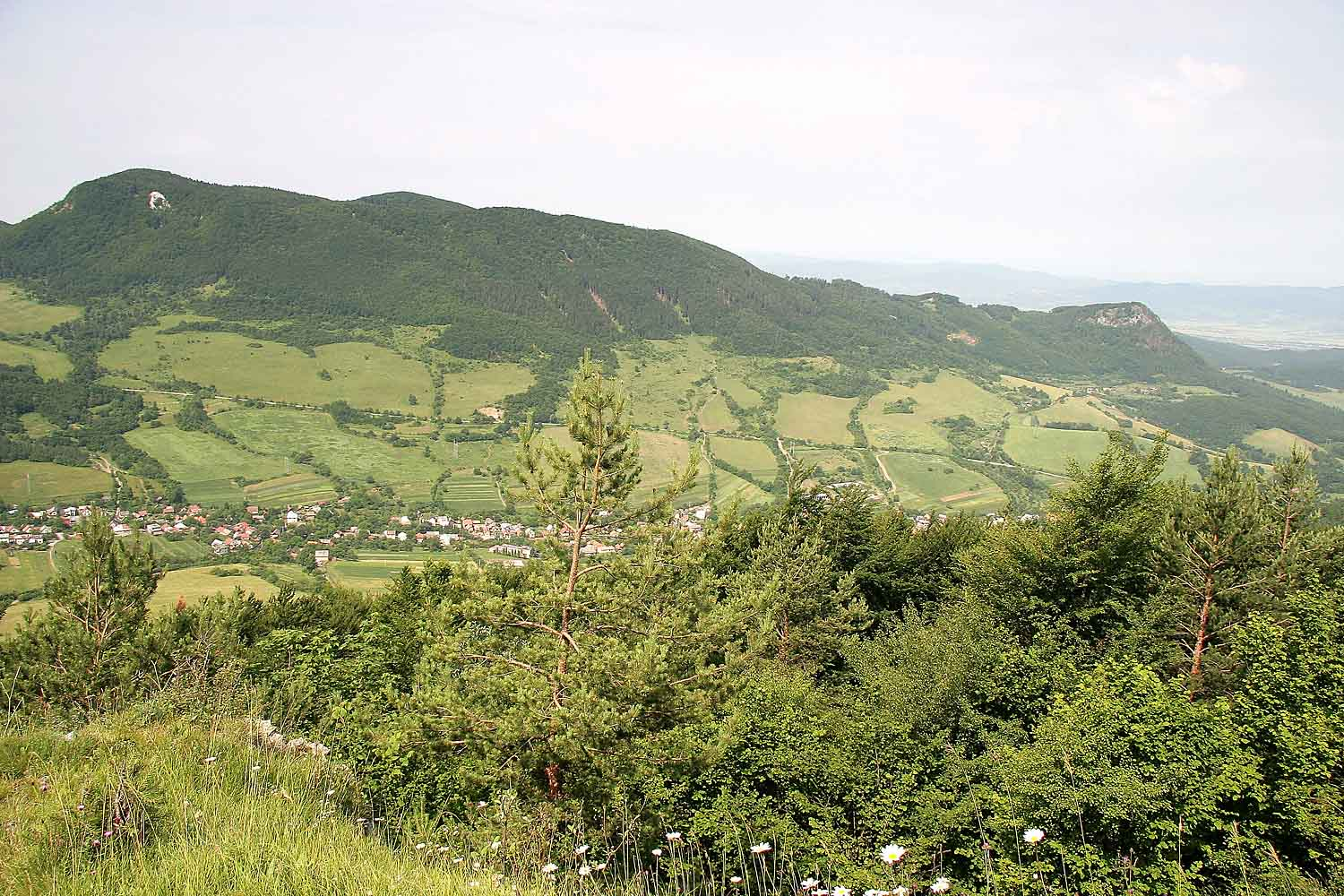

- Flag

- Location of Horná Poruba in the Trenčín Region Location of Horná Poruba in Slovakia
- Coordinates: 48.95°N 18.30°E
- Country: Slovakia
- Region: Trenčín Region
- District: Ilava District
- First mentioned: 1355

Area
  - Total: 13.69 km^{2} (5.29 sq mi)
- Elevation: 410 m (1,350 ft)

Population (2025)
  - Total: 1,111
- Time zone: UTC+1 (CET)
  - Summer (DST): UTC+2 (CEST)
- Postal code: 183 5
- Area code: +421 42
- Vehicle registration plate (until 2022): IL
- Website: {{URL|example.com|optional display text}}

Horná Poruba (Hungarian: Felsőtölgyes) is a village and municipality in Ilava District in the Trenčín Region of north-western Slovakia.

== History ==
In historical records the village was first mentioned in 1335.

== Geography ==
The municipality lies at an altitude of 410 metres (1,350 ft) and covers an area of 13.69 km^{2} (5.29 sq mi) (2025).

== Population ==
Population statistic (10 years)
Year	1995	2005	2015	2025
Count	1105	1097	1090	1111
Difference		−0.72%	−0.63%	+1.92%

Population statistic
Year	2024	2025
Count	1104	1111
Difference		+0.63%

It has a population of 1111 people (31 December 2025).

=== Ethnicity ===
Census 2021 (1+ %)
Ethnicity	Number	Fraction
Slovak	1075	99.16%
Total	1084	

In year 2021 was 1084 people by ethnicity 1075 as Slovak, 8 as Czech, 8 as Not found out, 3 as Other, 2 as Russian and 1 as Rusyn.

Note on population: The difference values of population numbers in the table "Population statistic" and in the sections "Ethnicity" & "Religion" is caused by the use of various statistical methods.

=== Religion ===
Census 2021 (1+ %)
Religion	Number	Fraction
Roman Catholic Church	961	88.65%
None	91	8.39%
Total	1084	

In year 2021 was 1084 people by religion 961 from Roman Catholic Church, 91 from None, 7 from Evangelical Church, 6 from Not found out, 6 from Greek Catholic Church, 5 from Ad hoc movements, 3 from Christian Congregations in Slovakia, 2 from Calvinist Church, 2 from Other and 1 from Old Catholic Church.

== Genealogical resources ==
The records for genealogical research are available at the state archive "Statny Archiv in Bytca, Slovakia"

- Roman Catholic church records (births/marriages/deaths): 1831-1895 (parish A)

== See also ==
- List of municipalities and towns in Slovakia
