= Tuchyňa =

- Municipality
- Flag

- Location of Tuchyňa in the Trenčín Region Location of Tuchyňa in Slovakia
- Coordinates: 49.03°N 18.22°E
- Country: Slovakia
- Region: Trenčín Region
- District: Ilava District
- First mentioned: 1243

Area
  - Total: 5.54 km^{2} (2.14 sq mi)
- Elevation: 265 m (869 ft)

Population (2025)
  - Total: 884
- Time zone: UTC+1 (CET)
  - Summer (DST): UTC+2 (CEST)
- Postal code: 185 5
- Area code: +421 42
- Vehicle registration plate (until 2022): IL
- Website: www.tuchyna.eu

Tuchyňa (Hungarian: Tohány) is a village and municipality in Ilava District in the Trenčín Region of north-western Slovakia.

== History ==
In historical records the village was first mentioned in 1243.

== Geography ==
The municipality lies at an altitude of 265 metres (869 ft) and covers an area of 5.54 km^{2} (2.14 sq mi) (2025).

== Population ==
Population statistic (10 years)
Year	1995	2005	2015	2025
Count	741	805	775	884
Difference		+8.63%	−3.72%	+14.06%

Population statistic
Year	2024	2025
Count	866	884
Difference		+2.07%

It has a population of 884 people (31 December 2025).

=== Ethnicity ===
Census 2021 (1+ %)
Ethnicity	Number	Fraction
Slovak	795	98.63%
Not found out	12	1.48%
Total	806	

In year 2021 was 806 people by ethnicity 795 as Slovak, 12 as Not found out, 6 as Czech, 1 as Serbian and 1 as Hungarian.

Note on population: The difference values of population numbers in the table "Population statistic" and in the sections "Ethnicity" & "Religion" is caused by the use of various statistical methods.

=== Religion ===
Census 2021 (1+ %)
Religion	Number	Fraction
Roman Catholic Church	711	88.21%
None	67	8.31%
Not found out	16	1.99%
Total	806	

In year 2021 was 806 people by religion 711 from Roman Catholic Church, 67 from None, 16 from Not found out, 5 from Evangelical Church, 3 from Greek Catholic Church, 2 from Other, 1 from Buddhism and 1 from Ad hoc movements.
