= Vršatské Podhradie =

- Municipality
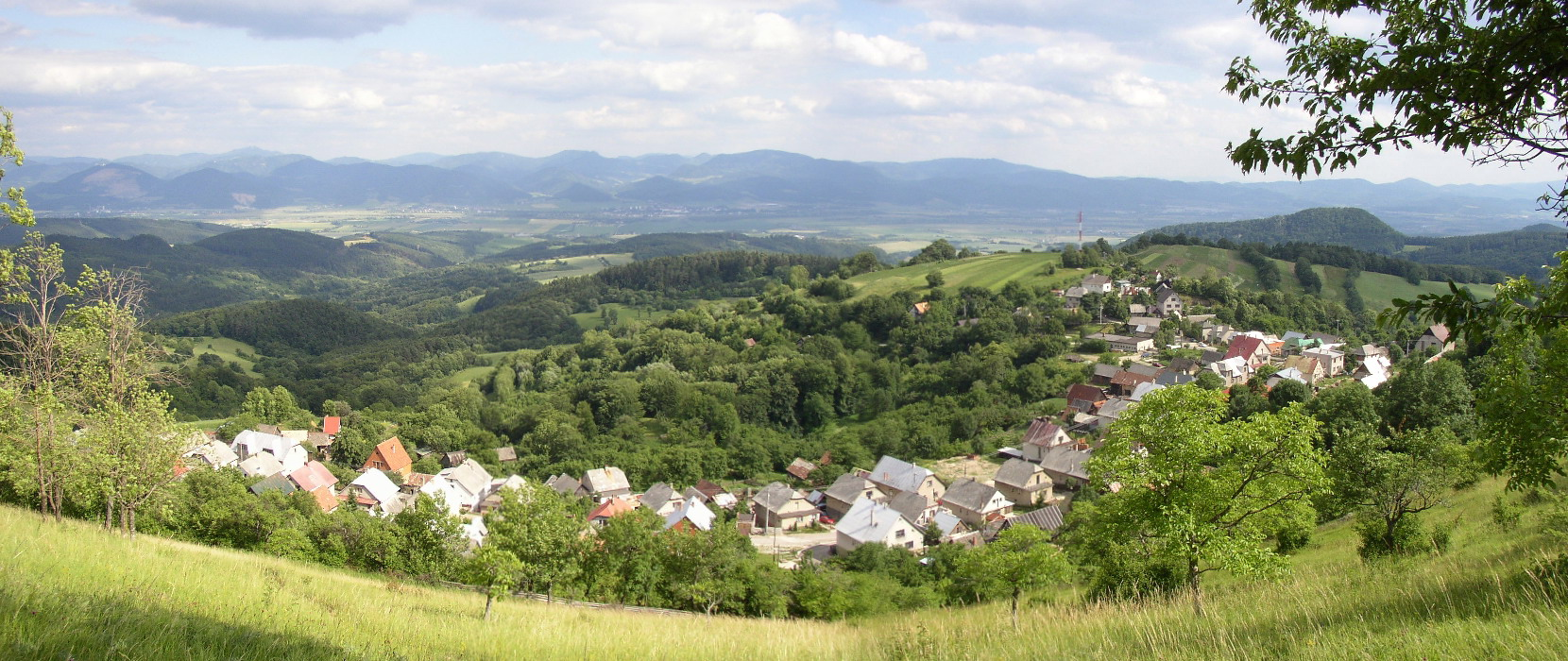

- Flag Coat of arms

- Location of Vršatské Podhradie in the Trenčín Region Location of Vršatské Podhradie in Slovakia
- Coordinates: 49.07°N 18.15°E
- Country: Slovakia
- Region: Trenčín Region
- District: Ilava District
- First mentioned: 1439

Area
  - Total: 13.43 km^{2} (5.19 sq mi)
- Elevation: 659 m (2,162 ft)

Population (2025)
  - Total: 213
- Time zone: UTC+1 (CET)
  - Summer (DST): UTC+2 (CEST)
- Postal code: 185 2
- Area code: +421 42
- Vehicle registration plate (until 2022): IL
- Website: www.vrsatskepodhradie.sk

Vršatské Podhradie (Hungarian: Oroszlánkő) is a village and municipality in Ilava District in the Trenčín Region of north-western Slovakia.

== History ==
In historical records the village was first mentioned in 1439.

== Geography ==
The municipality lies at an altitude of 659 metres (2,162 ft) and covers an area of 13.43 km^{2} (5.19 sq mi) (2025).

== Population ==
Population statistic (10 years)
Year	1995	2005	2015	2025
Count	284	254	232	213
Difference		−10.56%	−8.66%	−8.18%

Population statistic
Year	2024	2025
Count	217	213
Difference		−1.84%

It has a population of 213 people (31 December 2025).

=== Ethnicity ===
Census 2021 (1+ %)
Ethnicity	Number	Fraction
Slovak	216	97.29%
Not found out	6	2.7%
Czech	3	1.35%
Total	222	

In year 2021 was 222 people by ethnicity 216 as Slovak, 6 as Not found out, 3 as Czech, 1 as Rusyn and 1 as Hungarian.

Note on population: The difference values of population numbers in the table "Population statistic" and in the sections "Ethnicity" & "Religion" is caused by the use of various statistical methods.

=== Religion ===
Census 2021 (1+ %)
Religion	Number	Fraction
Roman Catholic Church	184	82.88%
None	24	10.81%
Not found out	5	2.25%
Christian Congregations in Slovakia	4	1.8%
Total	222	

In year 2021 was 222 people by religion 184 from Roman Catholic Church, 24 from None, 5 from Not found out, 4 from Christian Congregations in Slovakia, 1 from Calvinist Church, 1 from Other and not ascertained christian church, 1 from Greek Catholic Church, 1 from Buddhism and 1 from Ad hoc movements.

== Economy and infrastructure ==
There is a hotel (Hotel Vrsatec) located by the Vrsatec cliffs that provides employment for the village residents.

== Notable personalities ==
- Anton Svoboda (1861–1928), pedagogue, schoolman

== See also ==
- Vršatec castle
