= Dulov =

- Municipality
- Flag Coat of arms

- Location of Dulov in the Trenčín Region Location of Dulov in Slovakia
- Coordinates: 49.03°N 18.25°E
- Country: Slovakia
- Region: Trenčín Region
- District: Ilava District
- First mentioned: 1259

Area
  - Total: 5.53 km^{2} (2.14 sq mi)
- Elevation: 246 m (807 ft)

Population (2025)
  - Total: 889
- Time zone: UTC+1 (CET)
  - Summer (DST): UTC+2 (CEST)
- Postal code: 185 2
- Area code: +421 42
- Vehicle registration plate (until 2022): IL
- Website: www.dulov.sk

Dulov (Hungarian: Dúlóújfalu) is a village and municipality in the Ilava District of the Trenčín Region of Slovakia.

== Geography ==
The municipality lies at an altitude of 246 metres (807 ft) and covers an area of 5.53 km^{2} (2.14 sq mi) (2025).

== Population ==
Population statistic (10 years)
Year	1995	2005	2015	2025
Count	904	916	917	889
Difference		+1.32%	+0.10%	−3.05%

Population statistic
Year	2024	2025
Count	888	889
Difference		+0.11%

It has a population of 889 people (31 December 2025).

=== Ethnicity ===
Census 2021 (1+ %)
Ethnicity	Number	Fraction
Slovak	890	96.94%
Not found out	33	3.59%
Total	918	

In year 2021 was 918 people by ethnicity 890 as Slovak, 33 as Not found out, 7 as Czech, 4 as Romani and 1 as English.

Note on population: The difference values of population numbers in the table "Population statistic" and in the sections "Ethnicity" & "Religion" is caused by the use of various statistical methods.

=== Religion ===
Census 2021 (1+ %)
Religion	Number	Fraction
Roman Catholic Church	794	86.49%
None	63	6.86%
Not found out	35	3.81%
Christian Congregations in Slovakia	14	1.53%
Total	918	

In year 2021 was 918 people by religion 794 from Roman Catholic Church, 63 from None, 35 from Not found out, 14 from Christian Congregations in Slovakia, 6 from Evangelical Church, 3 from Other and not ascertained christian church, 2 from Ad hoc movements and 1 from Old Catholic Church.

== Genealogical resources ==
The records for genealogical research are available at the state archive "Statny Archiv in Bytca, Slovakia"

- Roman Catholic church records (births/marriages/deaths): 1671-1918 (parish B)

== See also ==
- List of municipalities and towns in Slovakia
