= Košeca =

- Municipality
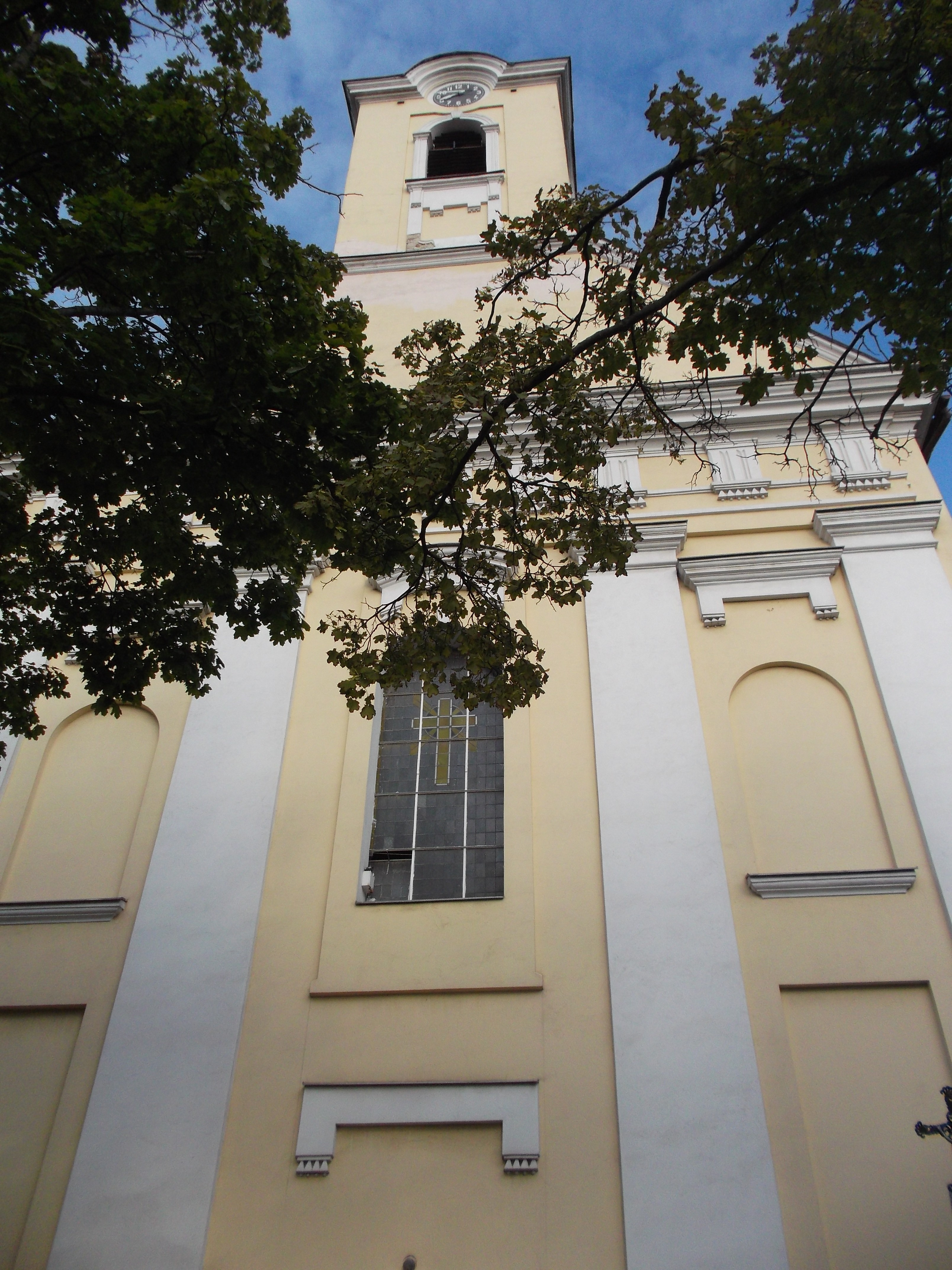
- Church of the Assumption of the Virgin Mary

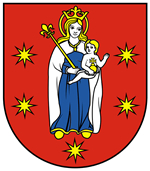
- Flag Coat of arms

- Location of Košeca in the Trenčín Region Location of Košeca in Slovakia
- Coordinates: 49.02°N 18.27°E
- Country: Slovakia
- Region: Trenčín Region
- District: Ilava District
- First mentioned: 1272

Area
  - Total: 18.94 km^{2} (7.31 sq mi)
- Elevation: 253 m (830 ft)

Population (2025)
  - Total: 2,868
- Time zone: UTC+1 (CET)
  - Summer (DST): UTC+2 (CEST)
- Postal code: 186 4
- Area code: +421 42
- Vehicle registration plate (until 2022): IL
- Website: www.koseca.sk

Košeca (Hungarian: Kasza) is a village and municipality in Ilava District in the Trenčín Region of north-western Slovakia.

== History ==
In historical records the village was first mentioned in 1272.

== Geography ==
The municipality lies at an altitude of 253 metres (830 ft) and covers an area of 18.94 km^{2} (7.31 sq mi) (2025).

Part of the cadastral municipality of Košeca is also Nozdrovice.

== Population ==
Population statistic (10 years)
Year	1995	2005	2015	2025
Count	2406	2475	2606	2868
Difference		+2.86%	+5.29%	+10.05%

Population statistic
Year	2024	2025
Count	2826	2868
Difference		+1.48%

It has a population of 2868 people (31 December 2025).

=== Ethnicity ===
Census 2021 (1+ %)
Ethnicity	Number	Fraction
Slovak	2668	97.58%
Not found out	61	2.23%
Total	2734	

In year 2021 was 2734 people by ethnicity 2668 as Slovak, 61 as Not found out, 26 as Romani, 15 as Czech, 5 as Italian, 5 as Other, 4 as Hungarian, 3 as Polish, 3 as German, 2 as Russian, 2 as English, 1 as Jewish, 1 as Vietnamese and 1 as French.

Note on population: The difference values of population numbers in the table "Population statistic" and in the sections "Ethnicity" & "Religion" is caused by the use of various statistical methods.

=== Religion ===
Census 2021 (1+ %)
Religion	Number	Fraction
Roman Catholic Church	1904	69.64%
None	535	19.57%
Evangelical Church	124	4.54%
Not found out	87	3.18%
Total	2734	

In year 2021 was 2734 people by religion 1904 from Roman Catholic Church, 535 from None, 124 from Evangelical Church, 87 from Not found out, 15 from Other, 13 from Greek Catholic Church, 13 from Apostolic Church, 9 from Christian Congregations in Slovakia, 8 from Other and not ascertained christian church, 6 from Ad hoc movements, 5 from Jehovah's Witnesses, 4 from Islam, 3 from Paganism and natural spirituality, 3 from Seventh-day Adventist Church, 2 from Calvinist Church, 1 from Eastern Orthodox Church, 1 from Buddhism and 1 from Baptists Church.

== Genealogical resources ==
The records for genealogical research are available at the state archive "Statny Archiv in Bytca, Slovakia"

- Roman Catholic church records (births/marriages/deaths): 1750-1895 (parish A)
- Lutheran church records (births/marriages/deaths): 1783-1895 (parish B)

== See also ==
- List of municipalities and towns in Slovakia
