= Ladce =

- Municipality
- Flag

- Location of Ladce in the Trenčín Region Location of Ladce in Slovakia
- Coordinates: 49.03°N 18.28°E
- Country: Slovakia
- Region: Trenčín Region
- District: Ilava District
- First mentioned: 1496

Area
  - Total: 15.69 km^{2} (6.06 sq mi)
- Elevation: 248 m (814 ft)

Population (2025)
  - Total: 2,458
- Time zone: UTC+1 (CET)
  - Summer (DST): UTC+2 (CEST)
- Postal code: 186 3
- Area code: +421 42
- Vehicle registration plate (until 2022): IL
- Website: www.ladce.sk/sk/

Ladce (Hungarian: Lédec) is a village and municipality in Ilava District in the Trenčín Region of north-western Slovakia.

== History ==
In historical records the village was first mentioned in 1496.

== Geography ==
The municipality lies at an altitude of 248 metres (814 ft) and covers an area of 15.69 km^{2} (6.06 sq mi) (2025).

== Population ==
Population statistic (10 years)
| Year | 1995 | 2005 | 2015 | 2025 |
|---|---|---|---|---|
| Count | 2603 | 2605 | 2606 | 2458 |
| Difference | | +0.07% | +0.03% | −5.67% |

Population statistic
| Year | 2024 | 2025 |
|---|---|---|
| Count | 2462 | 2458 |
| Difference | | −0.16% |

It has a population of 2458 people (31 December 2025).

=== Ethnicity ===
Census 2021 (1+ %)
| Ethnicity | Number | Fraction |
|---|---|---|
| Slovak | 2365 | 94.07% |
| Not found out | 137 | 5.44% |
| Total | 2514 | |

In year 2021 was 2514 people by ethnicity 2365 as Slovak, 137 as Not found out, 19 as Czech, 11 as Romani, 7 as Russian, 6 as Moravian, 4 as Rusyn, 2 as Vietnamese, 2 as Italian, 2 as Polish, 2 as Hungarian, 2 as Other, 1 as Jewish, 1 as Romanian, 1 as Austrian, 1 as Canadian and 1 as Greek.

Note on population: The difference values of population numbers in the table "Population statistic" and in the sections "Ethnicity" & "Religion" is caused by the use of various statistical methods.

=== Religion ===
Census 2021 (1+ %)
| Religion | Number | Fraction |
|---|---|---|
| Roman Catholic Church | 1665 | 66.23% |
| None | 559 | 22.24% |
| Not found out | 183 | 7.28% |
| Evangelical Church | 38 | 1.51% |
| Total | 2514 | |

In year 2021 was 2514 people by religion 1665 from Roman Catholic Church, 559 from None, 183 from Not found out, 38 from Evangelical Church, 25 from Apostolic Church, 8 from Christian Congregations in Slovakia, 8 from Greek Catholic Church, 8 from Ad hoc movements, 6 from Other, 4 from Other and not ascertained christian church, 3 from Buddhism, 2 from Calvinist Church, 1 from Eastern Orthodox Church, 1 from Jehovah's Witnesses, 1 from New Apostolic Church, 1 from Islam and 1 from United Methodist Church.

== Famous people ==
Rastislav Blaško, former vice-chairman of Social Democratic Party of Slovakia lived in Ladce from 1971 to 1979 (he was born in 1971 in Ilava). He is holder of twice bronze medal for 3rd place as the staff member of Slovak FootGolf National Team at the 2. European Team FootGolf Championship EURO FOOTGOLF 2019 in United Kingdom, England and 2021 in Hungary.
