= Krivoklat =

Krivoklat may refer to:

- Krivoklát, a municipality and village in Slovakia
- Křivoklát, a market town in the Czech Republic
  - Křivoklát Castle in the market town
