= Mikušovce, Ilava District =

Mikušovce
- Municipality
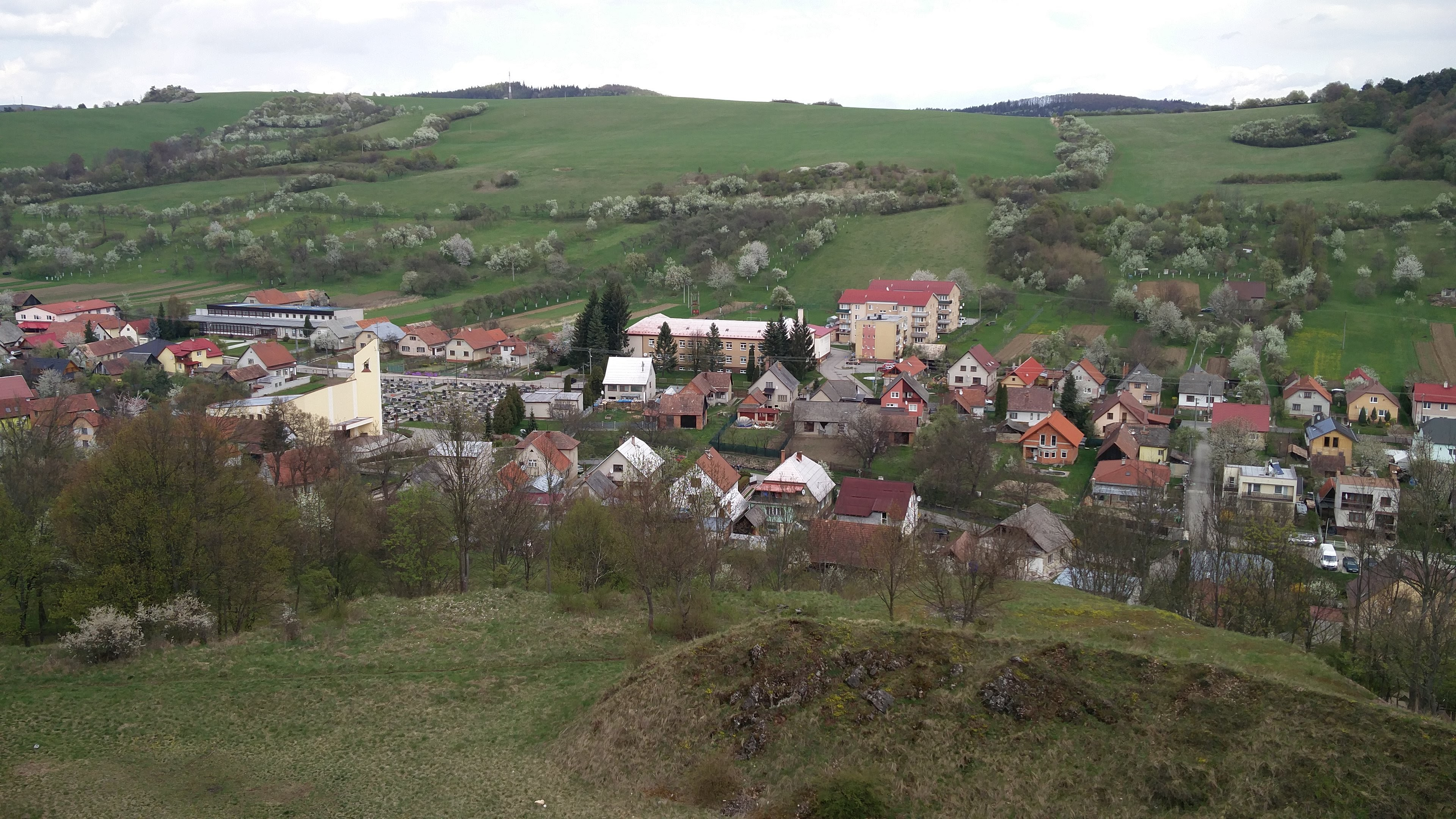

- Flag

- Location of Mikušovce in the Trenčín Region Location of Mikušovce in Slovakia
- Coordinates: 49°04′00″N 18°12′20″E
- Country: Slovakia
- Region: Trenčín Region
- District: Ilava District
- First mentioned: 1259

Area
  - Total: 8.49 km^{2} (3.28 sq mi)
- Elevation: 308 m (1,010 ft)

Population (2025)
  - Total: 1,048
- Time zone: UTC+1 (CET)
  - Summer (DST): UTC+2 (CEST)
- Postal code: 185 7
- Area code: +421 42
- Vehicle registration plate (until 2022): IL
- Website: www.mikusovce.sk

Mikušovce (Slovak pronunciation: [ˈmikuʂɔwtse]; Hungarian: Mikosfalva) is a village and municipality in Ilava District in the Trenčín Region of north-western Slovakia.

== History ==
In historical records the village was first mentioned in 1259.

== Geography ==
The municipality lies at an altitude of 308 metres (1,010 ft) and covers an area of 8.49 km^{2} (3.28 sq mi) (2025).

== Population ==
Population statistic (10 years)
Year	1995	2005	2015	2025
Count	996	1011	1033	1048
Difference		+1.50%	+2.17%	+1.45%

Population statistic
Year	2024	2025
Count	1044	1048
Difference		+0.38%

It has a population of 1048 people (31 December 2025).

=== Ethnicity ===
Census 2021 (1+ %)
Ethnicity	Number	Fraction
Slovak	1010	96.19%
Not found out	25	2.38%
Czech	21	2%
Total	1050	

In year 2021 was 1050 people by ethnicity 1010 as Slovak, 25 as Not found out, 21 as Czech, 4 as Russian, 2 as Rusyn, 2 as Other, 1 as Jewish, 1 as Italian, 1 as Romani, 1 as Moravian and 1 as Hungarian.

Note on population: The difference values of population numbers in the table "Population statistic" and in the sections "Ethnicity" & "Religion" is caused by the use of various statistical methods.

=== Religion ===
Census 2021 (1+ %)
Religion	Number	Fraction
Roman Catholic Church	882	84%
None	114	10.86%
Not found out	32	3.05%
Total	1050	

In year 2021 was 1050 people by religion 882 from Roman Catholic Church, 114 from None, 32 from Not found out, 4 from Christian Congregations in Slovakia, 4 from Other, 4 from Greek Catholic Church, 3 from Calvinist Church, 3 from Ad hoc movements, 2 from Buddhism, 1 from Paganism and natural spirituality and 1 from Evangelical Church.
