= Pruské =

- Municipality
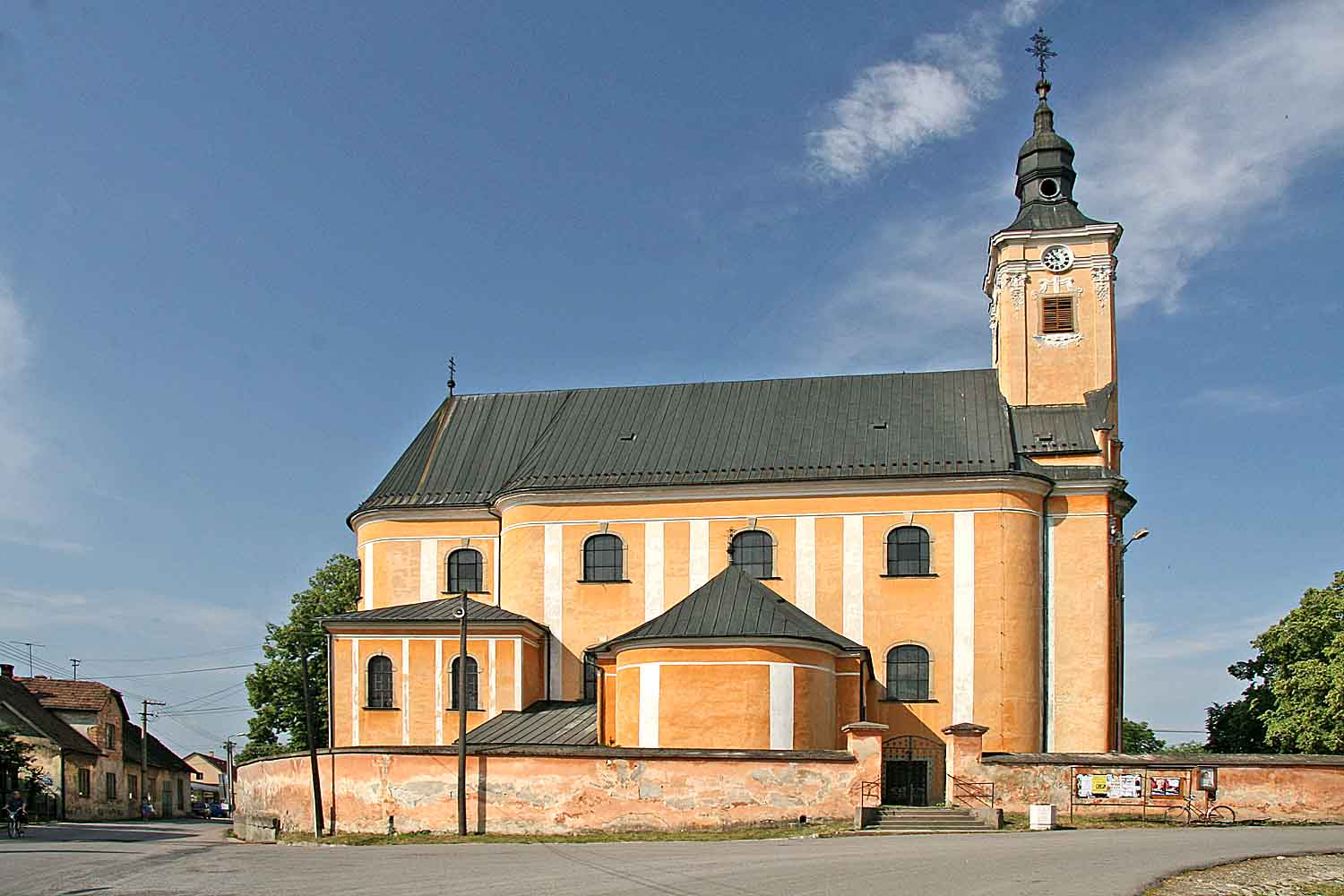

- Flag Coat of arms

- Location of Pruské in the Trenčín Region Location of Pruské in Slovakia
- Coordinates: 49.03°N 18.22°E
- Country: Slovakia
- Region: Trenčín Region
- District: Ilava District
- First mentioned: 1224

Area
  - Total: 19.96 km^{2} (7.71 sq mi)
- Elevation: 242 m (794 ft)

Population (2025)
  - Total: 2,295
- Time zone: UTC+1 (CET)
  - Summer (DST): UTC+2 (CEST)
- Postal code: 185 2
- Area code: +421 42
- Vehicle registration plate (until 2022): IL
- Website: www.obecpruske.sk

Pruské (Hungarian: Poroszka) is a village and municipality in Ilava District in the Trenčín Region of north-western Slovakia.

== History ==
In historical records the village was first mentioned in 1224.

== Geography ==
The municipality lies at an altitude of 242 metres (794 ft) and covers an area of 19.96 km^{2} (7.71 sq mi) (2025).

== Population ==
Population statistic (10 years)
Year	1995	2005	2015	2025
Count	2683	2083	2274	2295
Difference		−22.36%	+9.16%	+0.92%

Population statistic
Year	2024	2025
Count	2290	2295
Difference		+0.21%

It has a population of 2295 people (31 December 2025).

=== Ethnicity ===
Census 2021 (1+ %)
Ethnicity	Number	Fraction
Slovak	2183	94.5%
Not found out	124	5.36%
Total	2310	

In year 2021 was 2310 people by ethnicity 2183 as Slovak, 124 as Not found out, 21 as Czech, 5 as Romani, 5 as Moravian, 5 as Other, 3 as Romanian, 2 as Hungarian, 2 as English, 1 as Irish, 1 as Ukrainian, 1 as Rusyn, 1 as Polish and 1 as Albanian.

Note on population: The difference values of population numbers in the table "Population statistic" and in the sections "Ethnicity" & "Religion" is caused by the use of various statistical methods.

=== Religion ===
Census 2021 (1+ %)
Religion	Number	Fraction
Roman Catholic Church	1832	79.31%
None	292	12.64%
Not found out	121	5.24%
Total	2310	

In year 2021 was 2310 people by religion 1832 from Roman Catholic Church, 292 from None, 121 from Not found out, 20 from Evangelical Church, 9 from Greek Catholic Church, 7 from Other, 6 from Christian Congregations in Slovakia, 6 from Ad hoc movements, 3 from Calvinist Church, 2 from Paganism and natural spirituality, 2 from Jehovah's Witnesses, 2 from Seventh-day Adventist Church, 2 from Buddhism, 1 from Eastern Orthodox Church, 1 from Other and not ascertained christian church, 1 from Islam, 1 from Church of the Brethren, 1 from Baptists Church and 1 from Apostolic Church.
