= Vršatec castle =

Historic site in Slovakia

Vršatské Castle
- Vršatské Podhradie, Slovakia
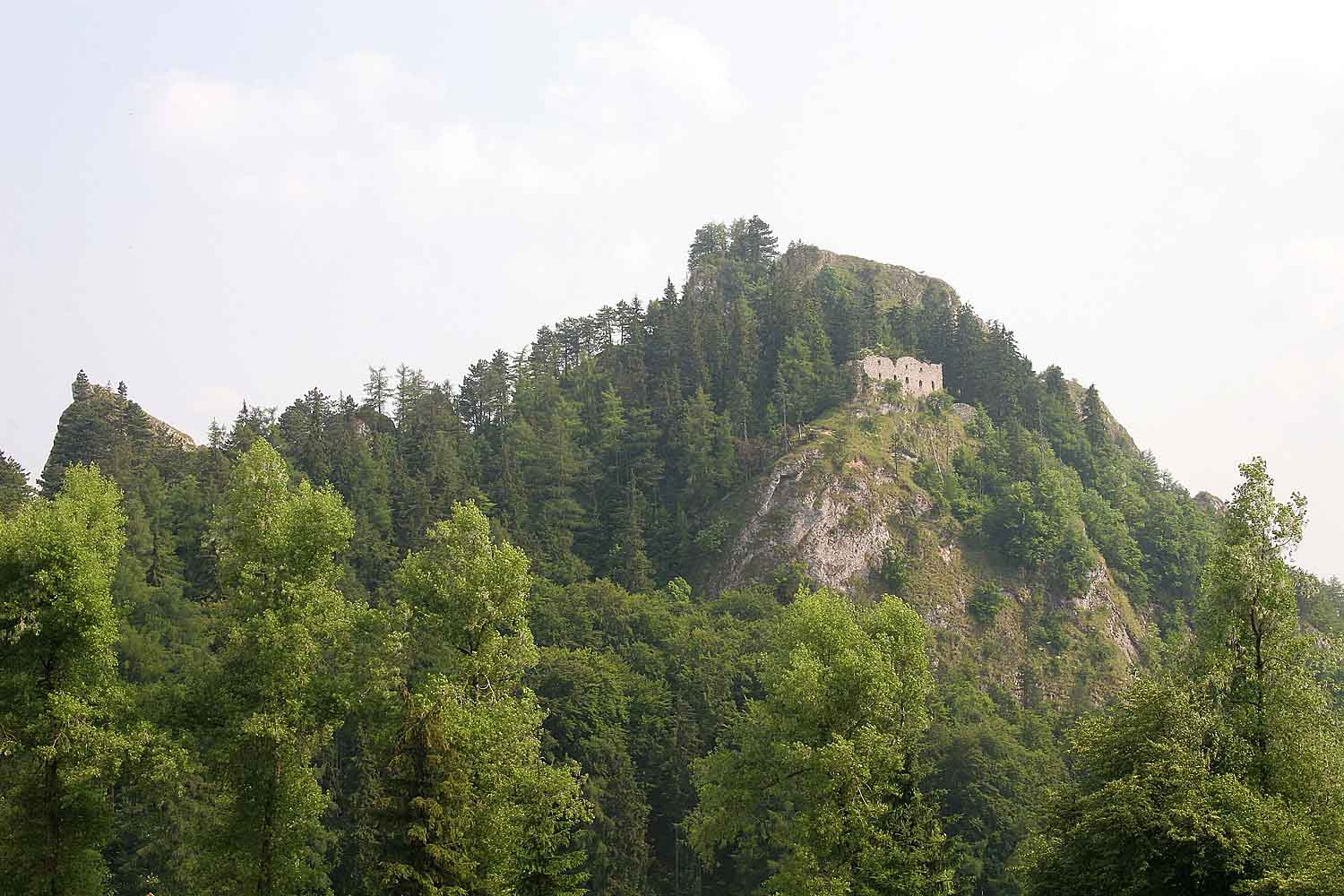
- View of the castle

Site information
- Type: Castle

Location
- Coordinates: 49.0665°N 18.15079°E

Vršatec Castle (Slovak: Vršatec hrad) are the ruins of a castle located on the Vršatec ridge, above the village of Vršatské Podhradie in the White Carpathians.

== History ==
The area was inhabited earlier by people from the Lusatian and Púchov cultures, and from the 9th to the 10th century by Slavic tribes. The construction of the castle, which belonged to the line defending the northwestern border of Hungary, began in the 13th century after the Mongol invasion. The castle's foundation consisted of an upper castle with an inner tower, which was the dominant defensive structure of the entire complex. At the end of the 13th century, the castle became part of the estate of Matthew III Csák. In 1396, it was acquired by Stibor of Stiboricz. In the 15th century, the castle underwent extensive reconstruction, and in 1439 the first written mention of Vršatské Podhradíe, then known as Podhradhye, appeared. Later, the castle changed hands several times, belonging to, Barbara of Cilli, her daughter Elizabeth of Luxembourg, or minor nobility. In the 17th century, further modifications were made to the castle, but it gradually began to decline, as the nobility began to prefer lower-lying residences, especially the manor house in Pruske.

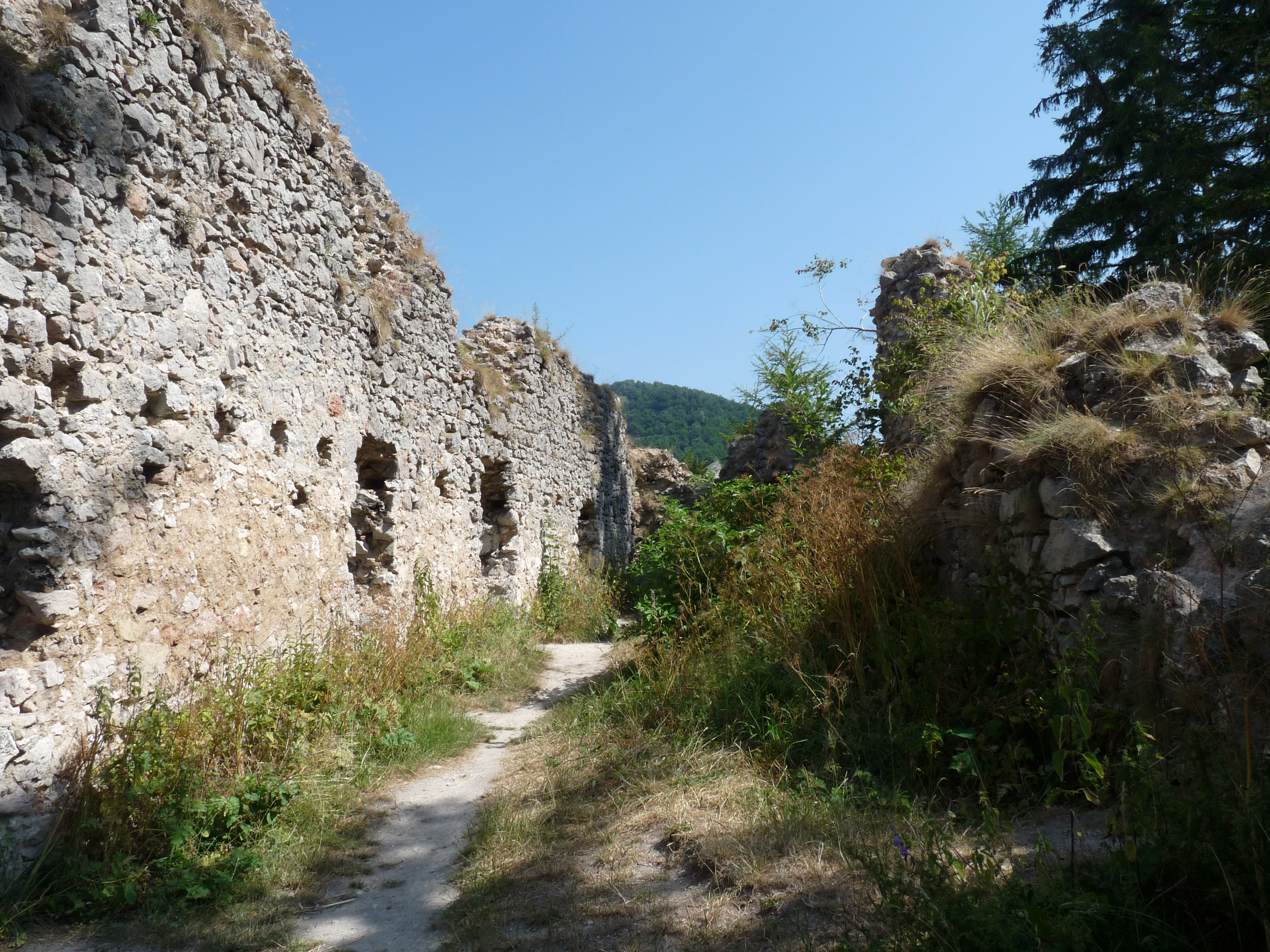
Walls of the castle

In 1680, the castle was burned down by the imperial army on the orders of the Emperor Leopold I. However, after reconstruction, the castle burned down in 1707, and during the Rákóczi Uprising, the imperial troops deliberately destroyed it with explosives. The owners did not proceed with further reconstruction. Nowadays, the castle is a ruin. Local volunteers are working to preserve and make it accessible.

== See also ==
- List of castles in Slovakia
