= Krivoklát =

- Municipality
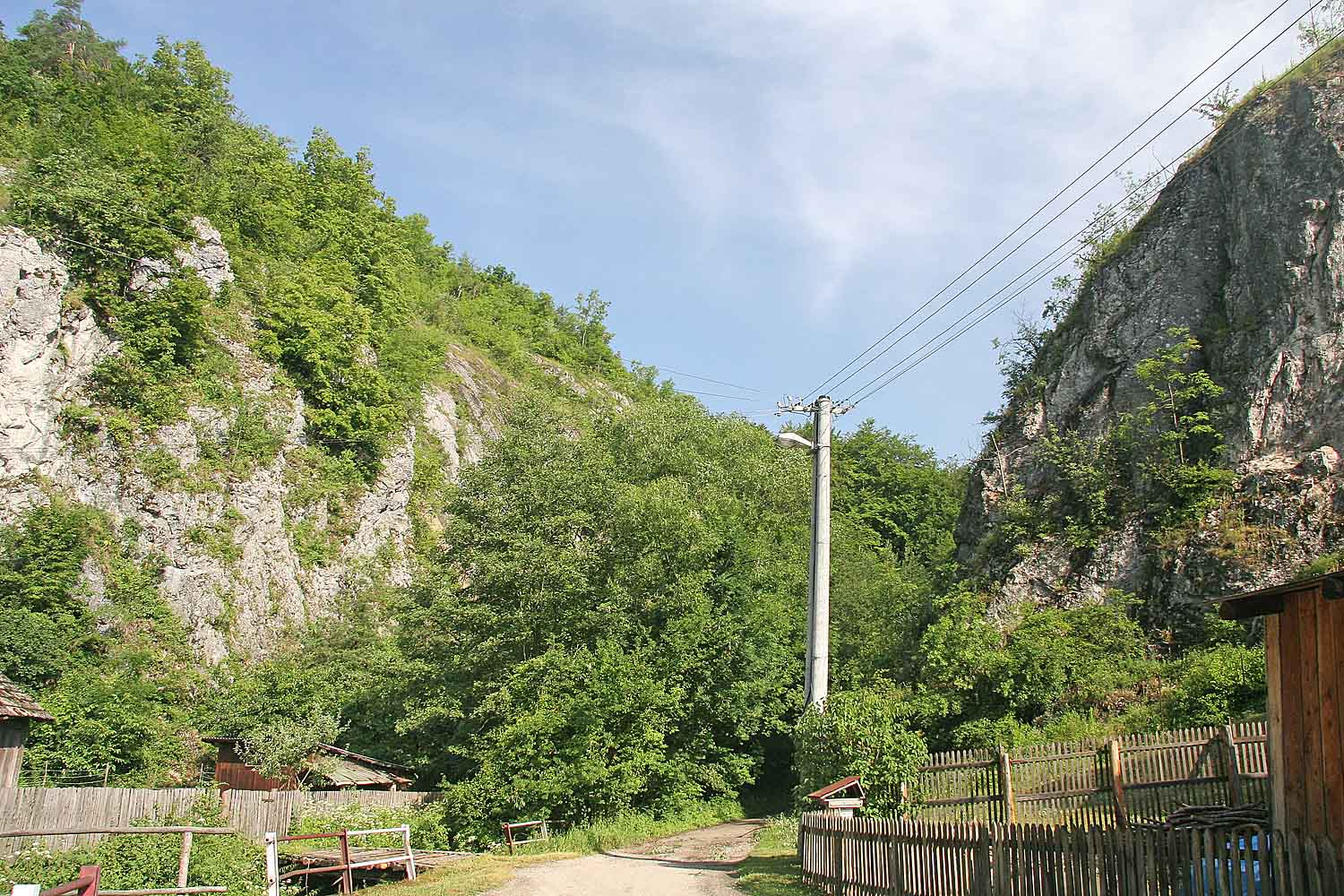

- Flag

- Location of Krivoklát in the Trenčín Region Location of Krivoklát in Slovakia
- Coordinates: 49.05°N 18.17°E
- Country: Slovakia
- Region: Trenčín Region
- District: Ilava District
- First mentioned: 1439

Area
  - Total: 10.66 km^{2} (4.12 sq mi)
- Elevation: 322 m (1,056 ft)

Population (2025)
  - Total: 219
- Time zone: UTC+1 (CET)
  - Summer (DST): UTC+2 (CEST)
- Postal code: 185 2
- Area code: +421 42
- Vehicle registration plate (until 2022): IL
- Website: obeckrivoklat.sk

Krivoklát (Hungarian: Széppatak) is a village and municipality in Ilava District in the Trenčín Region of north-western Slovakia.

== History ==
In historical records the village was first mentioned in 1439.

== Geography ==
The municipality lies at an altitude of 322 metres (1,056 ft) and covers an area of 10.66 km^{2} (4.12 sq mi) (2025).

== Population ==
Population statistic (10 years)
Year	1995	2005	2015	2025
Count	326	289	247	219
Difference		−11.34%	−14.53%	−11.33%

Population statistic
Year	2024	2025
Count	218	219
Difference		+0.45%

It has a population of 219 people (31 December 2025).

=== Ethnicity ===
Census 2021 (1+ %)
Ethnicity	Number	Fraction
Slovak	233	97.89%
Not found out	6	2.52%
Total	238	

In year 2021 was 238 people by ethnicity 233 as Slovak, 6 as Not found out, 2 as Czech and 2 as Other.

Note on population: The difference values of population numbers in the table "Population statistic" and in the sections "Ethnicity" & "Religion" is caused by the use of various statistical methods.

=== Religion ===
Census 2021 (1+ %)
Religion	Number	Fraction
Roman Catholic Church	204	85.71%
None	23	9.66%
Not found out	9	3.78%
Total	238	

In year 2021 was 238 people by religion 204 from Roman Catholic Church, 23 from None, 9 from Not found out, 1 from Other and not ascertained christian church and 1 from Other.
