= Slovak Bandy Association =

Sports governing body in Slovakia

Logo.

Slovak Bandy Association (Slovenská asociácia Bandy) is the governing body of bandy in Slovakia. It was founded 12 May 2017 and is based in Trenčianske Teplice, Trenčin Region. It was admitted to the Federation of International Bandy the same year.

== National team ==
- Slovakia
