= Ilava District =

Coordinates: 48°59′55″N 18°14′6″E

- District
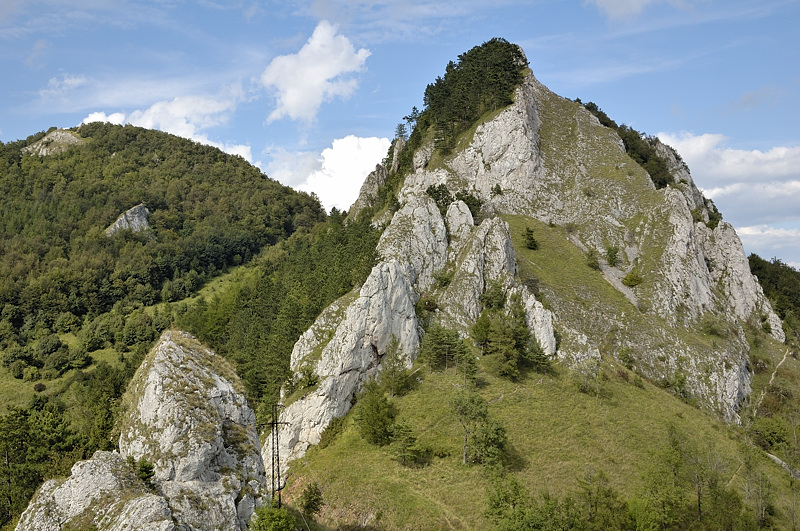
- Country: Slovakia
- Region (kraj): Trenčín Region
- Seat: Ilava

Area
  - Total: 358.50 km^{2} (138.42 sq mi)

Population (2025)
  - Total: 56,166
- Time zone: UTC+1 (CET)
  - Summer (DST): UTC+2 (CEST)
- Telephone prefix: 042
- Vehicle registration plate (until 2022): IL
- Municipalities: 21

Ilava District (Slovak: okres Ilava, Hungarian: Illavai járás) is a district in the Trenčín Region of western Slovakia. Until 1918, the district was part of the county of Kingdom of Hungary of Trencsén.

== Population ==
Historical population
Year	Pop.	±%
1970	47,353	—
1980	53,879	+13.8%
1991	61,047	+13.3%
2001	62,042	+1.6%
2011	60,578	−2.4%
2021	58,058	−4.2%
Source: Censuses

Population statistic (10 years)
Year	1995	2005	2015	2025
Count	62,283	61,251	59,952	56,166
Difference		−1.65%	−2.12%	−6.31%

Population statistic
Year	2024	2025
Count	56,647	56,166
Difference		−0.84%

It has a population of 56,166 people (31 December 2025).

=== Ethnicity ===
Census 2021 (1+ %)
Ethnicity	Number	Fraction
Slovak	54,722	92.5%
Not found out	2958	5%
Czech	697	1.17%
Total	59,156	

In year 2021 was 59,156 people by ethnicity 54,722 as Slovak, 2958 as Not found out, 697 as Czech, 148 as Other, 95 as Romani, 90 as Hungarian, 80 as Russian, 42 as German, 42 as Moravian, 36 as Rusyn, 34 as Ukrainian, 34 as Polish, 31 as Italian, 20 as English, 14 as Bulgarian, 13 as Jewish, 13 as Vietnamese, 12 as Serbian, 11 as Canadian, 9 as Austrian, 8 as Korean, 8 as Croatian, 7 as Irish, 7 as French, 7 as Albanian, 6 as Romanian, 4 as Iranian, 3 as Chinese, 3 as Greek, 1 as Turkish and 1 as Silesian.

Note on population: The difference values of population numbers in the table "Population statistic" and in the sections "Ethnicity" & "Religion" is caused by the use of various statistical methods.

=== Religion ===
Census 2021 (1+ %)
Religion	Number	Fraction
Roman Catholic Church	38,063	65.56%
None	13,802	23.77%
Not found out	3771	6.5%
Evangelical Church	961	1.66%
Total	58,058	

In year 2021 was 58,058 people by religion 38,063 from Roman Catholic Church, 13,802 from None, 3771 from Not found out, 961 from Evangelical Church, 234 from Greek Catholic Church, 202 from Ad hoc movements, 192 from Christian Congregations in Slovakia, 189 from Other, 115 from Apostolic Church, 103 from Other and not ascertained christian church, 76 from Jehovah's Witnesses, 63 from Buddhism, 60 from Calvinist Church, 59 from Paganism and natural spirituality, 56 from Eastern Orthodox Church, 38 from Islam, 12 from United Methodist Church, 12 from Seventh-day Adventist Church, 10 from Czechoslovak Hussite Church, 8 from Jewish community, 7 from Church of Jesus Christ of Latter-day Saints, 6 from Old Catholic Church, 6 from Hinduism, 5 from Church of the Brethren, 5 from Baptists Church, 2 from New Apostolic Church and 1 from Bahá'i Community.

== Municipalities ==
The district has 21 municipalities.

Municipality	Area [km^{2}]	Population
Bohunice	0.00	775
Bolešov	14.95	1,618
Borčice	4.13	762
Červený Kameň	32.59	628
Dubnica nad Váhom	49.13	21,356
Dulov	5.53	889
Horná Poruba	13.69	1,111
Ilava	24.30	5,455
Kameničany	5.07	553
Košeca	18.94	2,868
Košecké Podhradie	36.90	1,063
Krivoklát	10.66	219
Ladce	15.69	2,458
Mikušovce	8.49	1,048
Nová Dubnica	11.25	10,130
Pruské	19.96	2,295
Sedmerovec	6.00	416
Slavnica	7.81	869
Tuchyňa	5.54	884
Vršatské Podhradie	13.43	213
Zliechov	54.37	556

Population and area values are current for year 2025.
