= Vehicle registration plates of Slovakia =

Slovak Republic
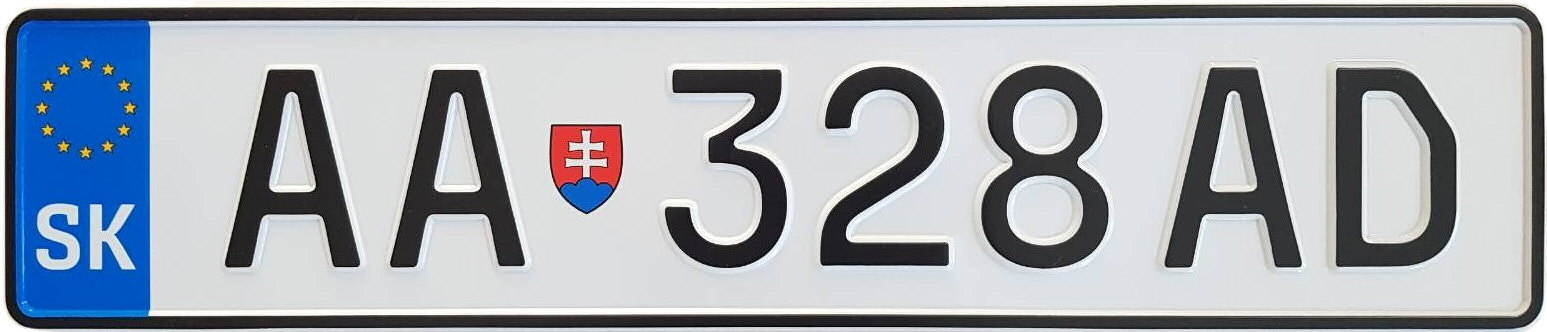
- An example of a Slovak car registration plate issued in January 2023, state-wide numbering scheme.
- Country: Slovakia
- Country code: SK

Current series
- Size: 520 mm × 110 mm 20.5 in × 4.3 in
- Serial format: AB123CD
- Colour (front): Black on white
- Colour (rear): Black on white

Vehicles registered in Slovakia were generally assigned to one of the districts (okres) and from 1997 until 2022, the license plate coding (Slovak: EČV, evidenčné číslo vozidla) generally consisted of seven characters and takes the form XX-NNNLL, where XX was a two letter code corresponding to the district, NNN was a three digit number and LL were two additional letters (assigned alphabetically).

From January 2023, a new state-wide numbering scheme was introduced, preserving the same layout, but replacing the initial two-letter district code with arbitrary letters of the alphabet (assigned alphabetically, starting with AA). Other changes include new font and a smaller coat of arms.

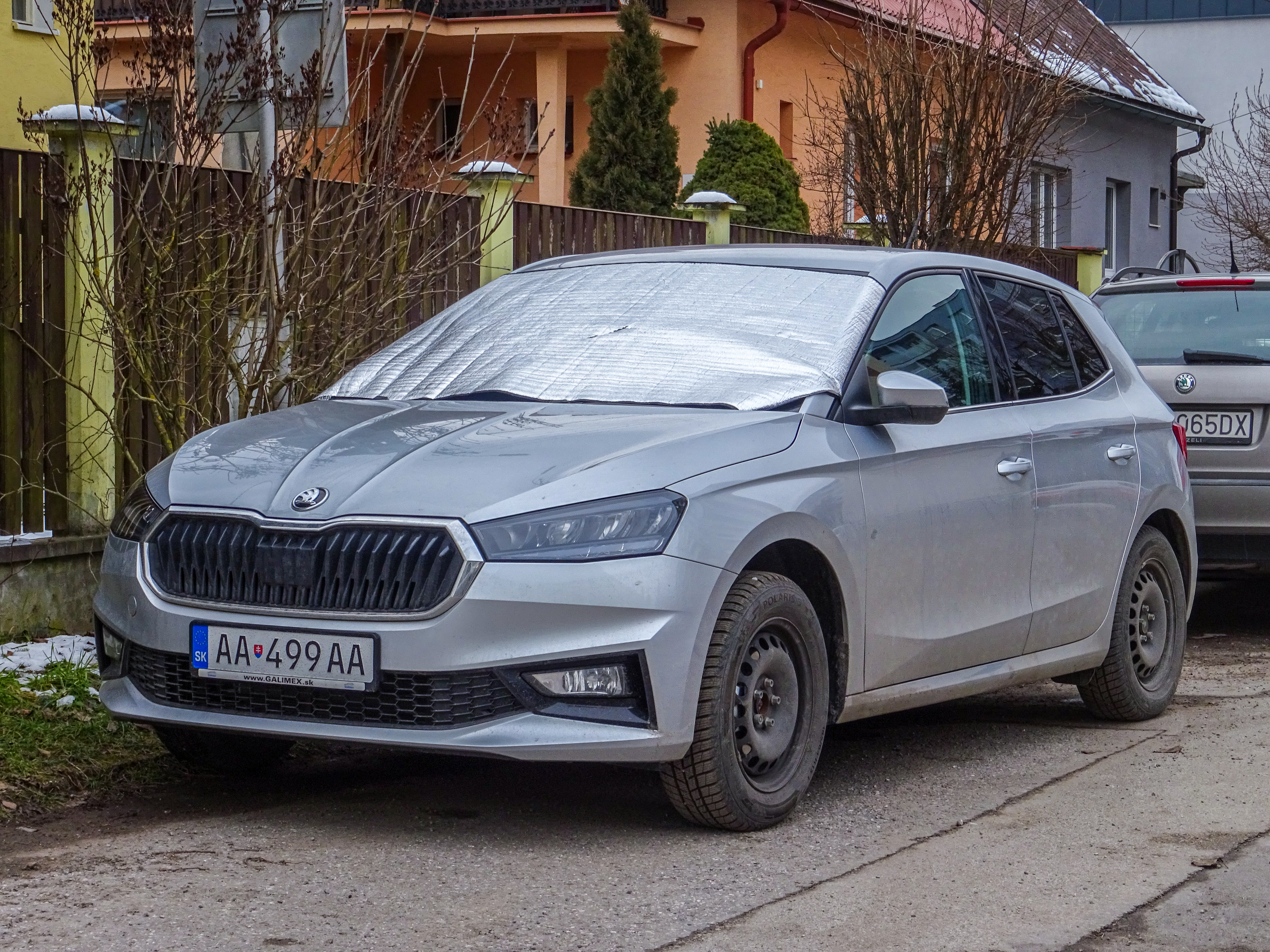
Škoda Fabia with new statewide license plate introduced in 2023

== Appearance ==
There are three design varieties that are in valid use.

- Between 1 April 1997 and 30 April 2004, the plates contained the Coat of Arms of Slovakia in the top left corner and the country code SK in the bottom left. The two district identifiers were separated from the serials by a dash.

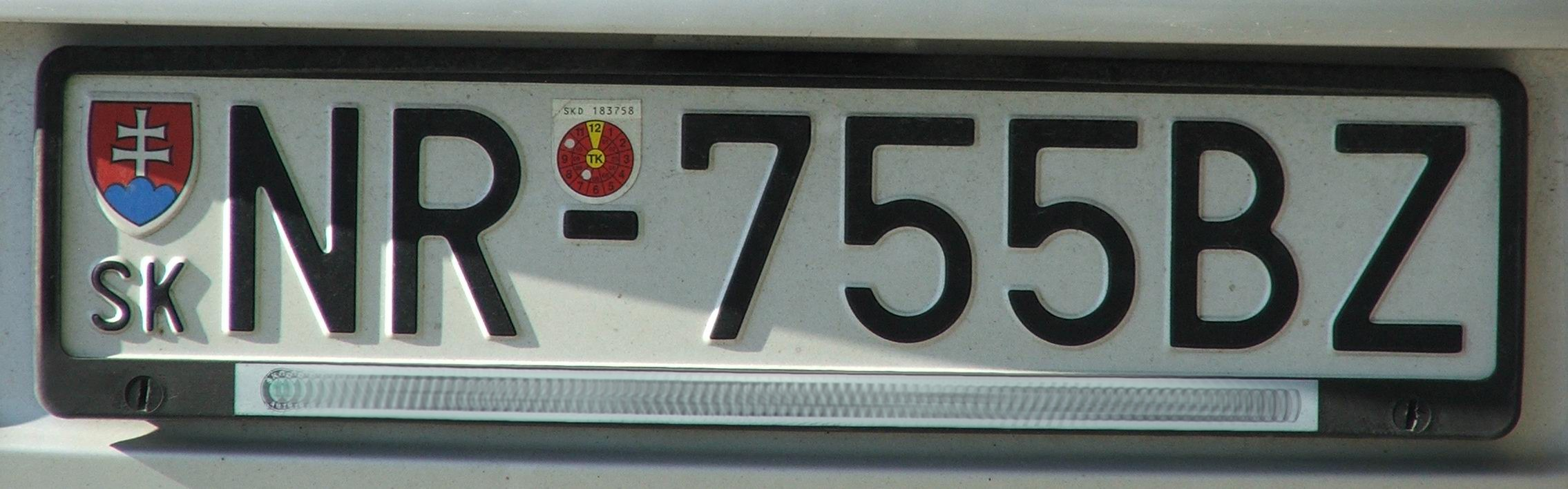
An example of Slovak car registration plate before entry of Slovakia to the EU - NR stands for Nitra District

- On 1 May 2004, Slovakia joined the European Union. In order to harmonise the visual look of the plates with the rest of the EU, the Slovak Coat of Arms was replaced by the so-called euroband, a vertical blue bar with representing the Flag of the EU. The country code SK was inserted into the euroband. The number 0 and letter O have been differentiated as well, the number has a stroke through it (similar to the German font.)

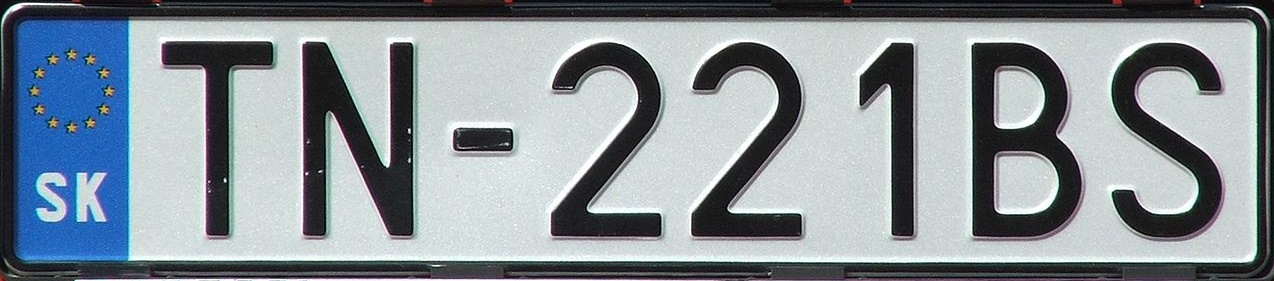
An example of Slovak car registration plate after entry of Slovakia to the EU without coats of arms - TN stands for Trenčín District

- The latest type has been used since 1 June 2006. The Slovak Coat of Arms has returned to the plates replacing the dash while keeping the EU part intact.

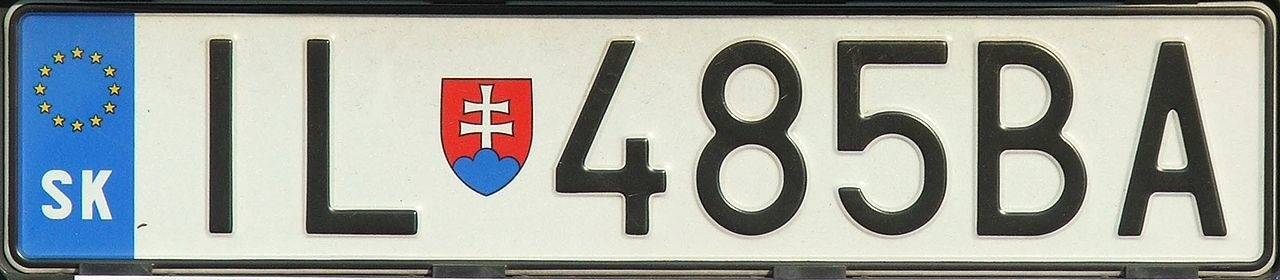
An example of Slovak car registration plate after entry of Slovakia to the EU with coats of arms - IL stands for Ilava District

- Starting from 2023, there is no longer an abbreviation of the district on the license plate. The composition of the registration numbers remains the same (2 letters - 3 digits - 2 letters), but registration numbers starts to be generated again starting at AA-001AA.

== Types ==
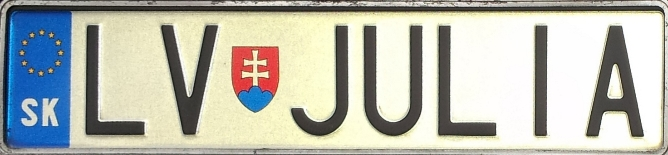
Personalized plate

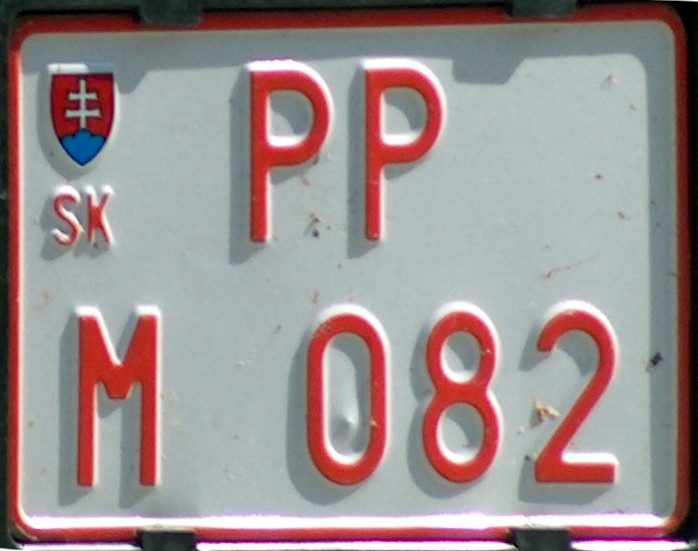
Slovak dealer plate

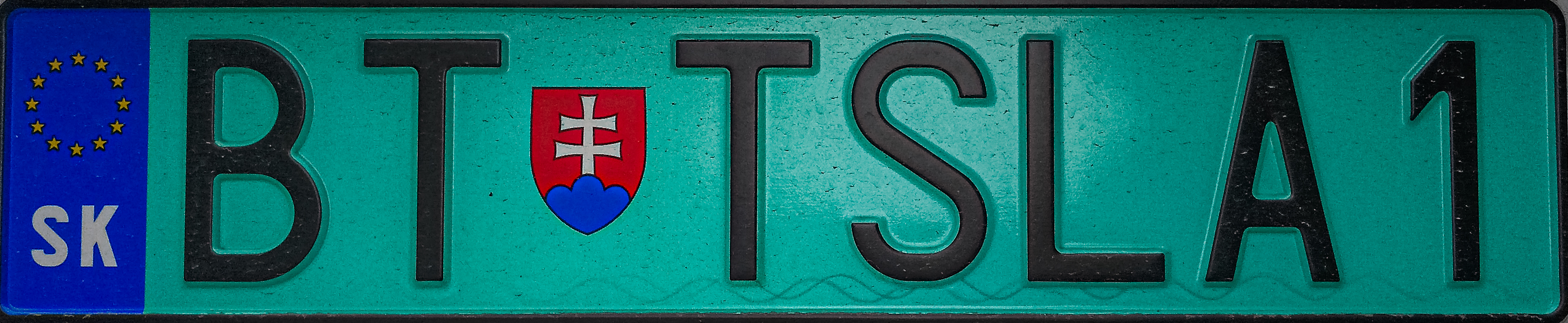
Slovak electric personalized vehicle plate, BT is Bratislava

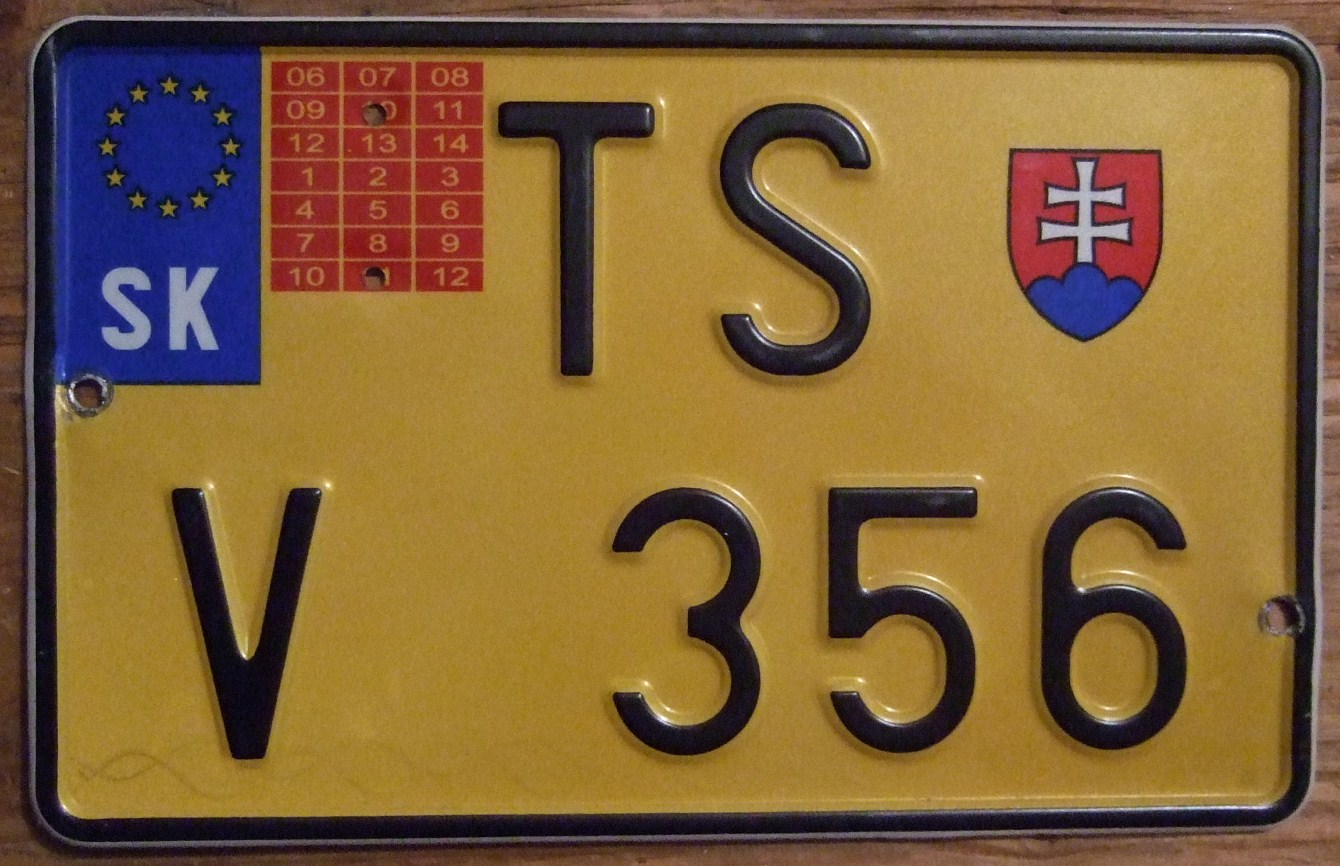
Slovak export/temporary plate

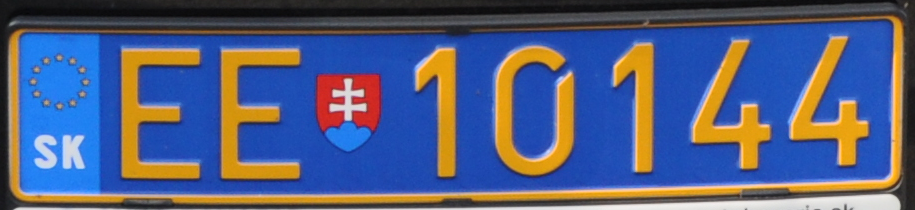
Diplomatic plate

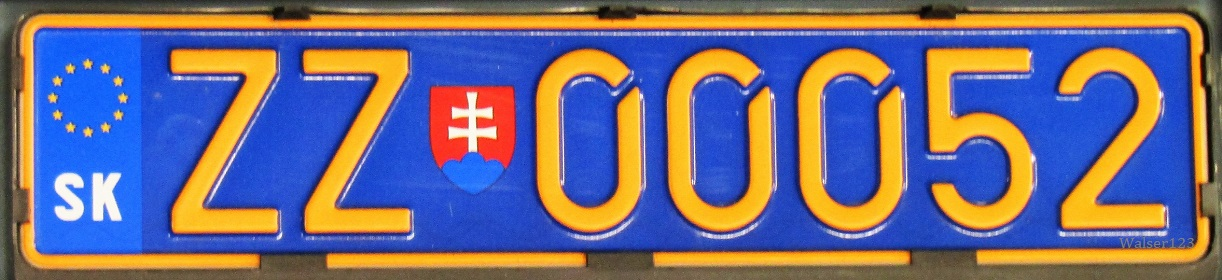
Diplomatic plate

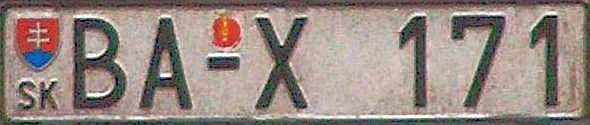
Slovak license plates for officials

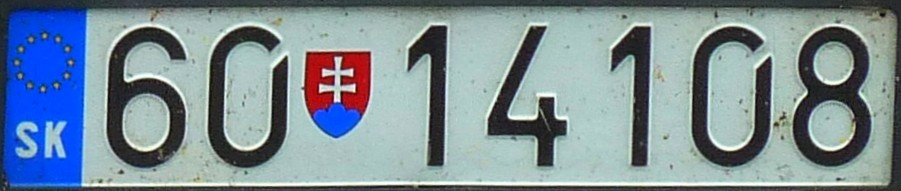
Slovak military license plate

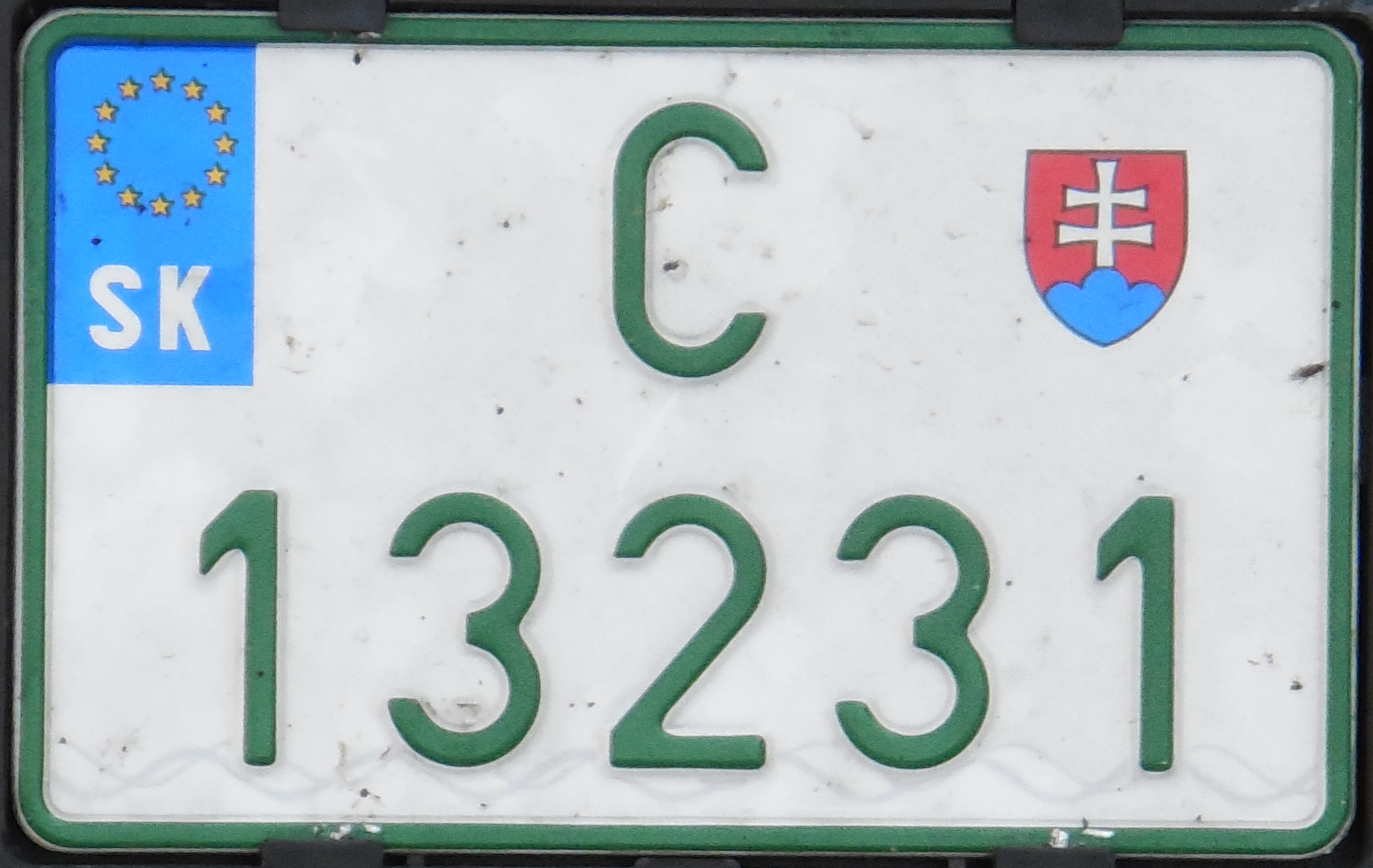
Import plate

- Regular plates are the most commonly used of all the types. They contain seven characters starting with the district code (see below) followed by a series of 3 numbers and 2 letters. The number series used are between 001 and 999. The letter series are between AA-XZ and ZA-ZZ. 24 letters are used (excluding Q, W and Slovak letters such as Š). Progression: 001AA-002AA...999AA, then 001AB...999AB. 999AZ is followed by 001BA through 999BB etc. Only Bratislava has reached 999ZZ as of February 2011.

Where limited space warrants it, two-line plates can be used on a vehicle. A block of combinations is set aside from the regular plate range as required.

- Trailer plates follow the format of the regular plates XX-NNNLL except in this case the first serial letter is always Y. The registrations thus starts at 001YA, continuing through 999YA and 001YB to 999YZ. Any build of trailer whether a mobile home or cargo trailer can use these plates. As of February 2011, Bratislava is nearing the end of its YZ series. Two-line plates also exist with a block of combinations set aside for them in each district.
- Motorcycle plates follow the same coding and use the same series as the regular plates. For example, DS-125AC can be both a regular plate and a motorcycle plate. The only difference is their size. Motorcycles use two different sizes both of which are smaller than the regular size.
- Personalized plates are optional in Slovakia for an extra fee. The former format had to include the two letter district code and 5 other characters in either XX-LLLLL, XX-LLLLN or LLLNN format. From 2023, first two characters must be letters, rest could be letter or numbers - LL-XXXXX. Unlike in any other type of plates, the use of Q and W is possible. Plates are not allowed to display any political, religious or offensive message. Smaller plates are available for motorcycles.
- Dealer plates follow the format XX-LLNNN or XX-L NNN and the first letter of the serial is "M". So the registrations starts with M 001 and then ends M 999. Then two letters will be issued, starting from MA001 continuing through MA999, then MB001 and so on until MZ999. Letters and numbers on this plate will be colored red.
- Temporary plates follow the same format as mentioned above but the first serial letter is "V". So registrations start with V 001 and then ends with V 999. Then two letters will be issued, starts from VA001 and ends with VZ999, continuing it with VB and so on until VZ999. These plates had yellow background. Also these plates had red stripe indicating expiration of these plates.
- Diplomatic plates have the format CD-NNNNN with black letters on a regular white licence plate since the year 2025. Previously issued diplomatic plates show the format EE-NNNNN or ZZ-NNNNN. These older plates have yellow letters on a darker blue background.
- Official plates have the format XX-L NNN or XX-NNN L, the serial letters after district code is "X".
- Military plates have the format NN-NNNNN.
- Import plates have green fonts, the format C-NNNNN or CL-NNNNN and a maximum validity period of one year.
- Sports cars or sportbikes plates had blue fonts and serial letter is "S".
- Electric cars were getting licence plates with classical numbering, but a green background on a request. In the new system since 2023 they will be getting plates starting with letters EL- and EV-, green letters on white background.

== Districts ==
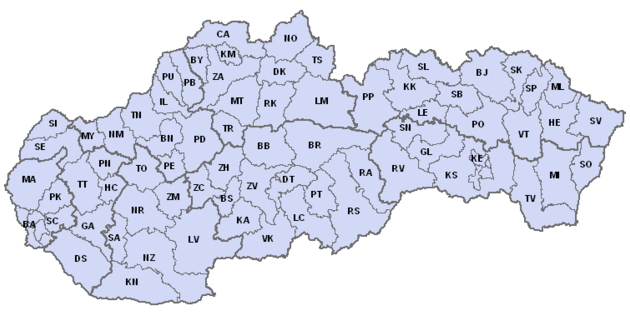
Slovak districts

There are 79 districts in Slovakia. In 69 cases, the district is named after and the code derived from its principal city which is included in the district. Two cities, Bratislava (the capital) and Košice (KE), consist of 5 and 4 districts respectively. This fact is not reflected on the plates, only one code is used. Additionally, Košice-okolie (KS) comprises an area around Košice (the city itself excluded) while having its seat in the city proper. Each district is assigned at least one code. Ten cities including eight seats of the region (kraj) are assigned more. Since 18 August 2010, Bratislava has been registering plates with its second code, BL. The Ministry of Interior of the Slovak Republic held a Facebook poll as the reaction to public dissatisfaction of Bratislava inhabitants with the previously intended BD code. As the combinations of the BL code are to be exhausted soon, another Facebook poll was organised in November 2018. Participants were asked to vote for the next code in three rounds (two semi-finals and one final). As much as 89% opted for the BT code over the BE. Bratislava is the only okres to do so and will remain in this position as since 2023 district codes were abolished.

code	district
BA, BD, BE, BI, BL, BT	Bratislava
BB, BC, BK	Banská Bystrica
BJ	Bardejov
BN	Bánovce nad Bebravou
BR	Brezno
BS	Banská Štiavnica
BY	Bytča
CA	Čadca
DK	Dolný Kubín
DS	Dunajská Streda
DT	Detva
GA	Galanta
GL	Gelnica
HC	Hlohovec
HE	Humenné
IL	Ilava
KA	Krupina
KE, KC, KI	Košice
KK	Kežmarok
KM	Kysucké Nové Mesto
KN	Komárno
KS	Košice-okolie
LC	Lučenec
LE	Levoča
LM	Liptovský Mikuláš
LV, LL	Levice
MA	Malacky
MI	Michalovce
ML	Medzilaborce
MT	Martin
MY	Myjava
NR, NI, NT	Nitra
NM	Nové Mesto nad Váhom
NO	Námestovo
NZ, NC	Nové Zámky
PB	Považská Bystrica
PD	Prievidza
PE	Partizánske
PK	Pezinok
PN	Piešťany
PO, PV, PS	Prešov
PP	Poprad
PT	Poltár
PU	Púchov
RA	Revúca
RK	Ružomberok
RS	Rimavská Sobota
RV	Rožňava
SA	Šaľa
SB	Sabinov
SC	Senec
SE	Senica
SI	Skalica
SK	Svidník
SL	Stará Ľubovňa
SN	Spišská Nová Ves
SO	Sobrance
SP	Stropkov
SV	Snina
TT, TA, TB	Trnava
TN, TC, TE	Trenčín
TO	Topoľčany
TR	Turčianske Teplice
TS	Tvrdošín
TV	Trebišov
VK	Veľký Krtíš
VT	Vranov nad Topľou
ZA, ZI, ZL	Žilina
ZC	Žarnovica
ZH	Žiar nad Hronom
ZM	Zlaté Moravce
ZV	Zvolen

== Former system ==
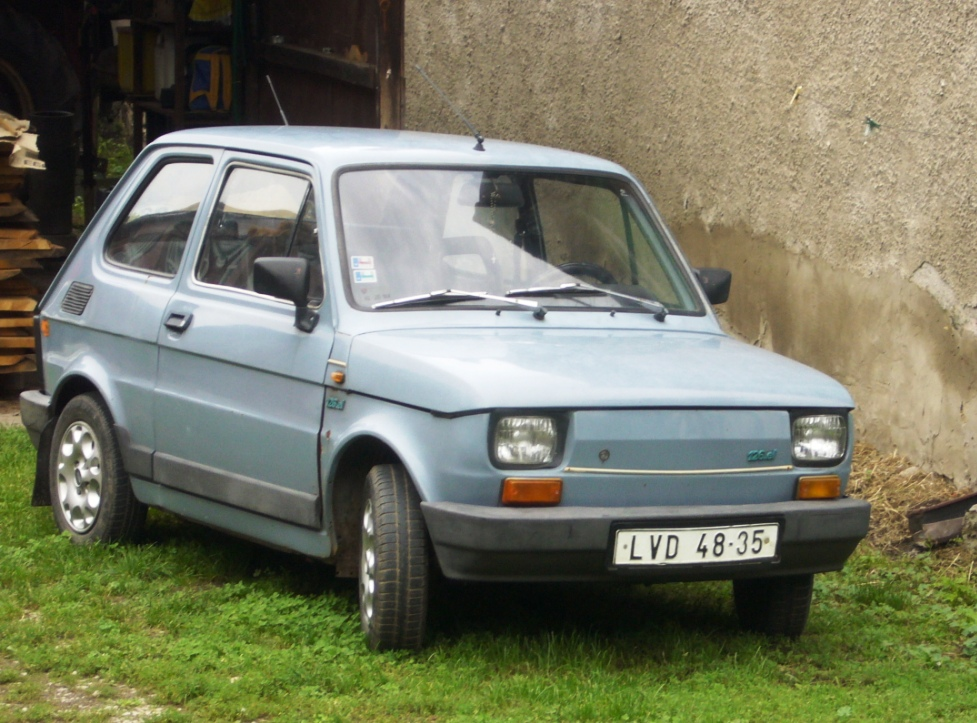
Fiat 126 with former registration plate from Levice district (1994-1997)

The older Czechoslovak system (Slovak: ŠPZ, štátna poznávacia značka) XX NN-NN or XXY NN-NN was in place until 30 March 1997. All such registrations expired on 1 January 2005; vehicles that had not been re-registered under the new system are not allowed on public roads.
