= Districts of Slovakia =

Administrative unit in Slovakia

The districts of Slovakia are administrative units known as okres in the Slovak language. It is a second-tier territorial administrative unit, below a Region (kraje) in standing, and superior to a municipality (obec). Each district contains at least several municipalities.

The cities of Bratislava and Košice are the only cities in Slovakia divided into internal urban districts, with five in Bratislava, and four in Košice. These urban districts are then further divided into smaller boroughs (which serve a function analogous to municipalities in typical districts).

All other districts are larger in size and also include rural areas, and rural as well as urban municipalities. Each of these more typical districts has an urban centre serving as the seat of the district, usually the largest town (or the only town) of a given district. Rural municipalities are not legally allowed to become district seats.

== Map of current Slovak districts ==
Districts (okresy) of Slovakia

== Characteristics ==
Several districts form a "region" (Slovak: kraj). One district, on the other hand, consists of several "municipalities" (Slovak: obce), which in turn consist of "cadastral areas" (Slovak: katastrálne územia).

Districts have been units of state administration in Slovakia since its creation with a few interruptions, e. g. the period from 2004 to late 2013. Today, each district is administered by a "district office" (okresný úrad). Since late 2013, there have also been some special district offices responsible (regarding some selected issues) not for the territory of a district, but for the territory of a region (kraj). These are called "district office at the seat of a region" (okresný úrad v sídle kraja).

In the period between 2004 and late 2013, the district offices were abolished and replaced by "circuit offices" (obvodný úrad.), which were usually responsible for several districts (except for the Nové Zámky District, which was one district with two circuit offices).

Slovakia currently has 79 districts, with the capital city of Bratislava being divided into 5 districts and the city of Košice into 4 districts. The districts are named after their administrative seats, colloquially known as "district towns". The district town is commonly the largest town in the district, although exceptions exist, such as Ilava District where the district town Ilava is far overshadowed by the much larger Dubnica nad Váhom, or Košice-okolie District, the seat of which (Košice) is not part of the district at all, instead being subdivided into four of its own districts.

== Districts of Slovakia ==
The following table gives an overview of the districts, along with the population, area, and location within Slovakia.

District (okres)	Population (2025)	Area in km^{2} (2025)	Region (kraj)
Bánovce nad Bebravou	34,714	461.94	Trenčín
Banská Bystrica	106,000	809.44	Banská Bystrica
Banská Štiavnica	15,258	292.29	Banská Bystrica
Bardejov	75,554	935.95	Prešov
Bratislava I	47,896	9.59	Bratislava
Bratislava II	127,409	92.49	Bratislava
Bratislava III	78,663	74.67	Bratislava
Bratislava IV	105,236	96.70	Bratislava
Bratislava V	121,698	94.20	Bratislava
Brezno	57,517	1265.24	Banská Bystrica
Bytča	31,511	281.51	Žilina
Čadca	86,104	760.61	Žilina
Detva	30,199	449.14	Banská Bystrica
Dolný Kubín	38,608	491.83	Žilina
Dunajská Streda	128,458	1074.58	Trnava
Galanta	95,106	641.70	Trnava
Gelnica	31,884	584.33	Košice
Hlohovec	42,519	267.22	Trnava
Humenné	57,846	754.23	Prešov
Ilava	56,166	358.50	Trenčín
Kežmarok	76,376	629.82	Prešov
Komárno	98,217	1100.14	Nitra
Košice III	26,964	16.83	Košice
Košice II	77,569	80.54	Košice
Košice I	62,243	85.45	Košice
Košice IV	55,510	60.90	Košice
Košice-okolie	134,540	1534.58	Košice
Krupina	21,129	584.89	Banská Bystrica
Kysucké Nové Mesto	32,370	173.68	Žilina
Levice	107,319	1551.12	Nitra
Levoča	33,305	421.00	Prešov
Liptovský Mikuláš	70,995	1340.99	Žilina
Lučenec	68,259	825.55	Banská Bystrica
Malacky	80,324	949.51	Bratislava
Martin	92,401	735.63	Žilina
Medzilaborce	10,518	427.26	Prešov
Michalovce	107,617	1019.20	Košice
Myjava	24,551	327.42	Trenčín
Námestovo	64,935	690.45	Žilina
Nitra	164,220	870.71	Nitra
Nové Mesto nad Váhom	61,105	579.98	Trenčín
Nové Zámky	133,309	1347.03	Nitra
Partizánske	42,755	301.01	Trenčín
Pezinok	70,096	375.53	Bratislava
Piešťany	61,476	381.12	Trnava
Poltár	19,951	476.28	Banská Bystrica
Poprad	101,671	1104.69	Prešov
Považská Bystrica	60,099	463.15	Trenčín
Prešov	176,096	933.95	Prešov
Prievidza	126,771	959.86	Trenčín
Púchov	43,318	375.10	Trenčín
Revúca	37,528	730.09	Banská Bystrica
Rimavská Sobota	79,222	1471.07	Banská Bystrica
Rožňava	58,189	1173.33	Košice
Ružomberok	56,022	646.79	Žilina
Sabinov	62,360	545.44	Prešov
Senec	108,313	359.88	Bratislava
Senica	58,584	683.26	Trnava
Skalica	46,440	357.07	Trnava
Snina	33,425	804.74	Prešov
Sobrance	22,118	538.15	Košice
Spišská Nová Ves	98,622	587.45	Košice
Stará Ľubovňa	53,435	707.85	Prešov
Stropkov	19,314	388.92	Prešov
Svidník	30,855	549.51	Prešov
Šaľa	49,514	355.90	Nitra
Topoľčany	68,831	597.62	Nitra
Trebišov	102,677	1073.45	Košice
Trenčín	113,057	674.81	Trenčín
Trnava	132,879	741.30	Trnava
Turčianske Teplice	15,580	392.86	Žilina
Tvrdošín	35,667	478.92	Žilina
Veľký Krtíš	40,235	848.14	Banská Bystrica
Vranov nad Topľou	79,320	769.23	Prešov
Zlaté Moravce	40,585	521.16	Nitra
Zvolen	65,001	759.02	Banská Bystrica
Žarnovica	24,327	425.08	Banská Bystrica
Žiar nad Hronom	42,955	517.65	Banská Bystrica
Žilina	159,997	815.08	Žilina

== See also ==
- Boroughs and localities of Bratislava
- Boroughs and localities of Košice
