= Badge of honour =

The term badge of honour may refer to a variety of awards and accolades, including:

- Badge of Honour or Queen's Certificate and Badge of Honour, a civil award presented by the governments of British Overseas Territories.
- Order of the Badge of Honour, a civilian award of the Soviet Union.
- Badge of Honour of the Bundeswehr, a German military decoration.
- The Badge of Honour, a Jamaican award.
- British Red Cross Badge of Honour.
- An award of the Order of Vanuatu.
- The badge of the Sijil Kemuliaan, a Singaporean award.
- International Handball Federation Referee's Badge of Honour.
- Badge of Honour for Fire Protection, in Germany.
- Honour Badge of Labour, a Belgian award for exceptional workers.
- Blood Donation Badge of Honor, presented by the German Red Cross for blood donations.
- Badge of Honor (film), a 1934 American film directed by Spencer Gordon Bennet
- Badge of Honor (Ukraine)

== See also ==
- Cross of Honour (disambiguation), various awards.
- Medal of Honor, the highest US military award.
- Order of Honour (disambiguation), various awards.
