= Eirik Kristoffersen =

Norwegian general (born 1969)

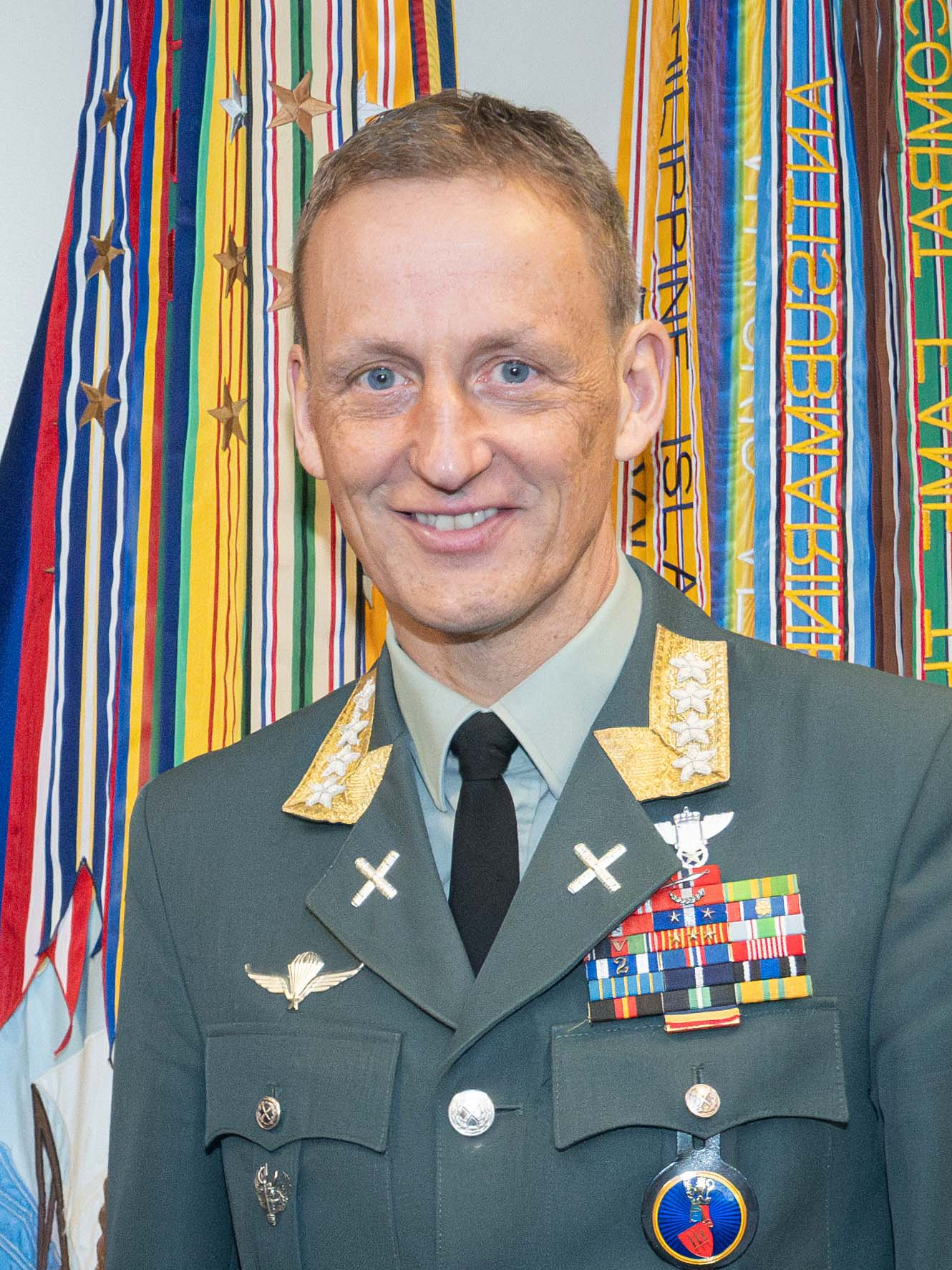
- Kristoffersen in 2024
- Born: 3 April 1969 (age 57); Bjerkvik, Norway
- Education: USMC Command and Staff College; United States Army War College
- Spouse: Linn-Therece Johansen Kristoffersen
- Military career
- Allegiance: Norway
- Branch: Norwegian Army
- Service years: 1988–present
- Rank: General
- Commands: Chief of Defence; Chief of the Norwegian Army; Chief of the Norwegian Home Guard; Deputy Commander, Norwegian Special Operations Command; Commander Armed Forces' Special Command
- Conflicts: Operation Enduring Freedom ISAF UNIFIL
- Awards: War Cross with Sword; Defence Cross of Honour; Defence Service Medal with Laurel Branch; Home Guard Medal of Merit; Defence Service Medal with one star; Defence Medal for International Operations with two stars; Medal for Defence Service Abroad with Rosette; Medal for Defence Operations Abroad – Afghanistan V; Military Service Medal Army with three stars; United Nations Medal – UNIFIL; NATO Medal – ISAF 2; Norwegian Civilian Marksmanship Association Badge of Honour; Brigade Veteran Association Badge of Honour; Norwegian defence shooting badge; Norwegian defence military sports badge; Danish Home Guard Medal of Merit; Swedish Home Guard Medal of Merit in gold; Gold Cross of Honour of the German Army; Latvian Special Forces Medal of Honor; Cross for the Four Day Marches; US Navy Presidential Unit Citation

Eirik Johan Kristoffersen (born 3 April 1969) is a Norwegian Army General who serves as the head of the Norwegian Armed Forces. He is a former Chief of the Norwegian Army and Norwegian Home Guard, and Chief of the Armed Forces' Special Command (FSK). Kristoffersen is the first Norwegian Chief of Defence since World War II with battle experience. He was awarded the War Cross with Sword in 2011 for his service in Afghanistan.

== Military career ==
Kristoffersen enrolled in non-commissioned officers' in 1988 and served as squad leader in the Engineer Battalion. After a few months studying engineering in college, he returned to military service in 1989 and served as squad leader in a pioneer platoon in UNIFIL (1991-1992).

From 1995-2000 he held several positions in the Reconnaissance Battalion, and underwent a selection process for FSK in 2000. In 2001 he was sent to Afghanistan as part of Operation Anaconda and also served in Lebanon.

He spent 12 years in FSK between 2000 and 2014, rising in the ranks from patrol member to commander. In 2014, he was appointed deputy Commander Norwegian Special Operations Command, before heading to Norwegian Joint Headquarters.

Later in 2017, he was appointed Commander Norwegian Home Guard, Commander Norwegian Army in 2019 and finally Chief of Defence in August 2020.

=== Embellishment of his war record (of 2007) ===
On 30 October 2022, Norwegian media said that Kristoffersen's narrative regarding the one operation (of two) for which he received the War Cross with Sword - is wrong; a September 2007 operation (in Tagab Valley) of which Kristoffersen was its operations officer, did not capture a Taliban leader; the intended goal of the operation was Qari Nejat (a Taliban leader) but instead the wrong man was arrested. The Norwegian Foreign Service including its embassy in Kabul, knew that the wrong man was arrested, and so did Norwegian Intelligence Service; Kristoffersen says that he was never informed that the wrong man was arrested.

The leader of the committee that gave War Cross with Sword - to Kristoffersen, said that we would never have given the medal if we had known that the wrong man was arrested. Previously, in a September 2022 interview, Kristoffersen said that after having read a Dagbladet article in 2009 - by Anders Sømme Hammer - that told about the 17 September 2007 arrest - in Tagab Valley, of Mohammed Naseem - Kristoffersen's conclusion was that "we still had arrested a person that two independent sources and intelligence, indicated was a Taliban leader in the valley".

An editorial in Klassekampen in October 2022, says that Kristoffersen's story is turned on its head, because it was a bricklayer who was mistakenly arrested - not a Taliban leader; furthermore, the wrong story contributed to Kristoffersen being conferred the War Cross with Sword, and that contributed to his [quick or] "lightning-career" to the top; furthermore, his story was highlighted by the government-instigated Godal-commission which in 2016 evaluated Norway's military effort in Afghanistan - therefore the information in this affair is more than just a [blemish or] scratch on Kristoffersen's resumé - it's also a problem for the official story about Norway's effort in Afghanistan.

Other reactions include the leader of Norwegian Officers' and Specialists' Union saying that there should be openness about the justification, when someone is given a war medal.

Reactions from members of Standing Committee on Foreign Affairs and Defence: In November, Ingrid Fiskaa said that it is quite odd and disturbing that central information about arresting the wrong person, does not reach the forces who performed the operation - and the Norwegian Armed Forces in general. Bjørnar Moxnes said that for 15 years, Norwegian authorities have celebrated this operation as a great victory, while our closest allies all along have known that this was a whopping failure in which considerable military resources were used to imprison an impoverished Afghan; furthermore, Norway's official Afghanistan-investigation made a success-story out of the operation in which Norwegian special forces with American support, exploded their way into a house with women and children and abducted an Afghan bricklayer in the belief that he was a Taliban leader. MPs have demanded that the armed forces and the defense ministry, get to the bottom of what went wrong - and why the mistake did not get known.

An editorial in Klassekampen in November 2022, said that American soldiers knew within hours of the operation, that the wrong person had been arrested; furthermore, information about that was swiftly shared with Norwegian forces and Norway's embassy; furthermore, there were more details about the operation: plastic handcuffs were used on all the people living in the house from which the bricklayer was removed. Furthermore, VG (newspaper) leaned heavily on to classified information from Afghan War documents leak to unravel the events and the timelines of the military operation.

Later in November, an article by Kristoffersen was printed by various media; furthermore, Kristoffersen said that he has never read the justification for his War Cross with Sword; furthermore, Kristoffersen gave his view of the military operation: "The American special forces that were with us, were a small detachment that were given permission at the last moment to be with us on this operation, to gain firsthand experience with a large and complex operation" by special forces; furthermore, the American forces "were not with us, for my personal safety"; furthermore, he said that our soldiers were there for almost 20 years and now the Taliban rule, therefore it is likely that everyone that our special forces contributed to having imprisoned, has been released. Furthermore he said about the prisoner: "I don't know why he later moved or why he finally was killed".

Mohammed Naseem was killed in 2010; in 2011 Norwegian media reported his death and that "therefore the lawsuit" would not materialize; later in 2011 Kristoffersen got War Cross with Sword.

Regarding the operation in 2007 - media have been told that the [ After-action review report or] "Post operations report" had the classification [secret or] hemmelig. However, some time after Kristoffersen's article (of 2022), Forsvarets Spesialkommando told media that the post operations report instead had the classification NATO SECRET; furthermore, the report has to stay classified because of the slide film presentation in the report; furthermore, for NATO to declassify the report - all 30 NATO member countries have to approve; furthermore, what is written in the report, the Norwegian Armed Forces does not want to reveal (as of January 2023).

In February 2023, media said that the armed forces is not revealing which colleague of Kristoffersen, wrote the recommendation (in January 2010) that Kristoffersen should get "a medal of valor"; furthermore, the identity of the two superior officers that gave support to the recommendation, is still being withheld (as of Q4 2023); one of the latter added a disclaimer (or reservation) to the support: "however", the council that decides should consider if the war cross with sword is (really) the right award.

As of December 2023, the Minister of Defence is refusing to release information that will answer three specific questions from Ingrid Fiskaa, MP.

In January 2024, the media reported information from the Norwegian base within Camp Warehouse, staffed by soldiers from Forsvarets Spesialkommando and Norwegian Intelligence Service. Three soldiers confirmed that information had arrived at the base that the wrong person was arrested, while a fourth said there was conversation that they had taken the wrong person.

Kristoffersen does not want to tell media, if the name of Qari Nejat, was removed from Joint Prioritized Effects List by Norwegian soldiers (after a different person (the bricklayer) was arrested in 2007); persons on that list, had their name removed from there when they got captured or killed; in January 2024, a retired U.S. Lieutenant Colonel (Shawn Dalrymple) said that Nejat's name was not removed from the Joint Prioritized Effects List.

As of February 2024, the Minister of Defence has declined being interviewed about the controversy. Three political parties are demanding (as of February), answers from the defence minister: the Socialist Left Party, Venstre, and KrF. The leader of parliament's Standing Committee on Foreign Affairs and Defence said that the Conservative Party's view is that the Ministry of Defence, should be as open about the matter, as possible. However, Kristoffersen said (March 2024) that the name used (regarding the arrestee), in the report to headquarters in Norway, was Mohammad Naseem.

The Defence University College's chief instructor (hovedlærer) of Leadership, Jostein Mattingsdal, said in March 2024, that the news articles are "a sad chapter of the Armed Forces".

== Military education ==
1988–1989 Non-commissioned officers' training school, 1992–1995 Military Academy, Army, 2008–2009 USMC Command and Staff College, 2014–2015 United States Army War College.

== Authorship ==
Kristoffersen wrote the book Jegerånden – Å lede i fred, krise og krig [The Jäger spirit – to lead in peace, crisis and war] (2020), and along with his brother, general major Frode Kristoffersen, he wrote Beredt – Forsvarsevne og motstandskraft [Prepared – Defense capability and resilience] (2025).

== Awards and decorations ==
Kristoffersen is one of Norway's most highly decorated soldiers still on active duty. He has received the following awards:

=== Norwegian medals and awards ===
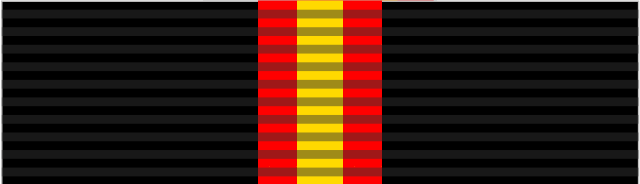
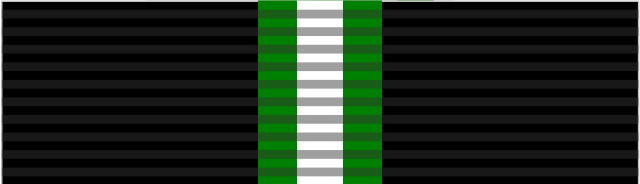
War Cross with Sword
Norwegian Defence Cross of Honour
Defence Service Medal with Laurel Branch
Norwegian Home Guard Medal of Merit
Defence Service Medal with two stars
Defence Medal for International Operations with one star
Medal for Defence Service Abroad with Rosette
Medal for Defence Operations Abroad Afghanistan V (five deployments)
Military Service Medal Army with three stars
Norwegian Civilian Marksmanship Association Badge of Honour
Brigade Veteran Association (No) Badge of Honour
Norwegian defence shooting badge with three stars
Norwegian defence military sports badge with laurel wreath

=== Foreign decorations ===
Legion of Honour Commander
Order of Merit (Ukraine)
United Nations Medal UN Interim Forces Lebanon (UNIFIL)
NATO Medal ISAF 2 (two deployments)
Danish Home Guard Medal of Merit
Swedish Home Guard Royal Medal of Merit in gold
Gold Cross of Honour of the German Army
Latvian Special Forces Medal of Honour, third degree
Macedonian Army's badge for Partnership, Coordination and Cooperation, in gold
Special Merits Cross (Ukraine)
Cross of Merit (Ukraine)
Cross for the Four Day Marches
US Navy Presidential Unit Citation (Note: FSK unit citation as part of Task Force K-Bar, Afghanistan)

=== Other awards ===
Order of Saint Maurice – Chief of Infantry of US Army
U.S. Army War College International Fellows Hall of Fame
The Norwegian Defence Gender Equality Award

== Personal life ==
Kristoffersen lives with his wife Linn-Therece Johansen Kristoffersen and has four children from two former marriages. His interests include hunting and football.

== Notes ==
Military offices
Preceded by Haakon Bruun-Hanssen	Chief of Defence of Norway; 2020–	Incumbent
