= Cross of Honour =

Cross of Honour/Honor or Honour/Honor Cross (German: Ehrenkreuz) may refer to:

== Austrian awards ==
- Cross of Honour for Science and Art of the Austrian Decoration for Science and Art
- Cross of Honour of the Abbot of Lilienfeld, an honour of the Roman Catholic Lilienfeld Abbey in Austria, founded in 1980

== Belgian awards ==
- Cross of Honour for Military Service Abroad, Belgian military medal for overseas service

== German awards ==
- Cross of Honour of the Bundeswehr, the highest grade of the Badge of Honour of the Bundeswehr, a military medal of the Federal Republic of Germany
- Bundeswehr Cross of Honour for Valour, the highest military decoration of the Federal Republic of Germany
- Cross of Honour of the German Mother, civil state decoration of the German Reich from 1938 to 1945
- Honour Cross of the World War 1914/1918, German First World War service medal

== International awards ==
- European Police Cross of Honor, honorary medal of the European association of the Bodies and Public Organisms of Security and of Defense

== Norwegian awards ==
- Civil Defence Cross of Honour, Norwegian medal for civil defence personnel
- Norwegian Defence Cross of Honour, civil medal awarded for assisting Norwegian defence forces
- Norwegian Police Cross of Honour, civil medal awarded for assisting Norwegian police

== United States awards ==
- Southern Cross of Honor, United Daughters of the Confederacy commemorative medal presented to United Confederate Veterans

== Other ==
- Cross of Honour, alternative title of the 2012 film Into the White
