= Orders, decorations, and medals of Norway =

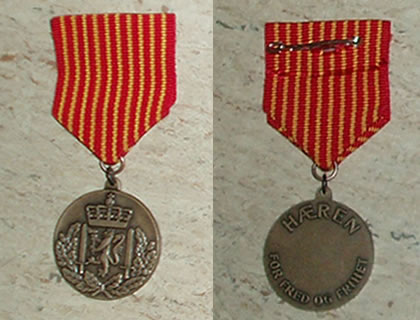
National Service Medal, army version

This is a list of Norwegian orders and medals in order of precedence. This list contains all medals approved for wearing on a Norwegian military uniform in ranked order.

== Group 1: Awarded by or approved by H.M. The King ==
Those awards presented by or approved by the King of Norway are worn in an order of precedence established by Royal Decree of 11 June 1943, with subsequent additions.

No.	Ribbon	Name in English (Note: Original Norwegian name as mouse-over text on the ribbon.)	Note
1	Krigskorset med sverd	War Cross With Sword	
2	Medaljen for borgerdåd	Medal for Outstanding Civic Service	obsolete since 2004
3	St. Olavs Orden	Royal Norwegian Order of St. Olav	all ranks and classes
4	Den Kongelige Norske Fortjenstorden	Royal Norwegian Order of Merit	all ranks and classes
5	Haakon VIIs Frihetskors	Haakon VII Freedom Cross	
6	St. Olavsmedaljen med ekegren	St. Olav's Medal With Oak Branch	
7	Medaljen for edel dåd	Medal for Heroism in Gold	
8	Kongens fortjenstmedalje	King's Medal of Merit in Gold	
9	St. Olavsmedaljen	St. Olav's Medal	
10	Krigsmedaljen	War Medal	without and with stars
11	Kongens fortjenstmedalje	King's Medal of Merit	
12	Forsvarets medalje for edel dåd	Armed Forces Medal for Heroic Deeds	
13	Haakon VIIs Frihetsmedalje	King Haakon VII Freedom Medal	
14	Medaljen for edel dåd	Medal for Heroism in Silver	
15	Medaljen for redningsdåd til sjøs	Medal for Rescue at Sea	
16	Nansenmedaljen for fremragende forskning	Nansen Medal for Outstanding Research	
17	Politiets hederskors	Norwegian Police Cross of Honor	equal in rank, listed by seniority
18	Sivilforsvarets hederskors	Civil Defence Cross of Honor	equal in rank, listed by seniority
19	Forsvarets hederskors	Norwegian Defence Cross of Honour	equal in rank, listed by seniority
20	Forsvarsmedaljen med laurbærgren	Defence Service Medal with Laurel Branch	
21	Politimedaljen med laurbærgren	Police Service Medal with Laurel Branch	
22	Sivilforsvarsmedaljen med laurbærgren	Civil Defence Service Medal with Laurel Branch	
23	Deltagermedaljen	Defence Medal 1940 – 1945	without and with rosette
24	Heimevernets fortjenstmedalje	Norwegian Home Guard Medal of Merit	
24a	Hærens fortjenstmedalje	Norwegian Army Medal of Merit	
24b	Sjøforsvarets fortjenstmedalje	Norwegian Navy Medal of Merit	
24c	Luftforsvarets fortjenstmedalje	Norwegian Air Force Medal of Merit	
24d	Etterretningstjenestens fortjenstmedalje	Norwegian Intelligence Service Medal of Merit	
25	Den norske Koreamedalje	Norwegian Korea Medal	
26	Maudheimmedaljen	Maudheim Medal	
27	Antarktismedaljen	Antarctic Medal	
28	H.M. Kongens erindringsmedalje	H. M. The King's Commemorative Medal in Gold	
29	Kongehusets 100-årsmedalje	Royal House Centennial Medal	
30	Kong Haakon VIIs minnemedalje	King Haakon VII's Commemorative Medal	in gold and silver
31	Kong Haakon VIIs jubileumsmedalje 1905–1930	King Haakon VII's 1905–1930 Jubilee Medal	
32	Kong Haakon VIIs jubileumsmedalje 1905-1955	King Haakon VII's 1905–1955 Jubilee Medal	
33	Haakon VIIs 70-årsmedalje	King Haakon VII's 70th Anniversary Medal	
34	Kong Haakon VIIs 100-årsmedalje	King Haakon VII's Centennial Medal	
35	Kong Olav Vs minnemedalje	King Olav V's Commemorative Medal	in gold and silver
36	Kong Olav Vs jubileumsmedalje 1957–1982	King Olav V's Anniversary Medal 1957–1982	
37	Kong Olav Vs 100-årsmedalje	King Olav V's 100th Anniversary Medal	
38	Kong Harald Vs jubileumsmedalje 1991–2016	King Harald V's Jubilee Medal 1991–2016	
39	H.M. Kongens erindringsmedalje	H. M. The King's Commemorative Medal in Silver	
40	Forsvarsmedaljen	Defence Service Medal	without and with stars
41	Politimedaljen	Police Service Medal	without and with stars
42	Sivilforsvarsmedaljen	Civil Defence Service Medal	without and with stars
43	Forsvarets medalje for sårede i strid	Wounded in Action Medal	without and with stars
44	Forsvarets medalje for internasjonale operasjoner	Armed Forces Medal for International Operations	without and with stars, laurel branch, golden laurel branch
45	Politiets medalje for internasjonal tjeneste	Police Medal for International Service	without and with stars, laurel branch
46	Sivilforsvarets medalje for internasjonal tjeneste	Civil Defence Medal for International Service	without and with stars, laurel branch
47		Medal for Defence Service Abroad	without and with rosette
47a	Forsvarets innsatsmedalje – Saudi Arabia	Medal for Defence Service Abroad – Saudi Arabia	without and with rosette
47b	Forsvarets innsatsmedalje – Balkan	Medal for Defence Service Abroad – Balkans	without and with rosette
47c	Forsvarets innsatsmedalje med rosett – Afghanistan	Medal for Defence Service Abroad with rosette – Afghanistan	
48		Medals for Defence Operations Abroad	
48a	Forsvarets operasjonsmedalje – Kosovo-Serbia-Montenegro	Medal for Defence Operations Abroad - Kosovo-Serbia-Montenegro	
48b	Forsvarets operasjonsmedalje – Active Endeavour	Medal for Defence Operations Abroad – Operation Active Endeavour	
48c	Forsvarets operasjonsmedalje – Afghanistan	Medal for Defence Operations Abroad – Afghanistan	
48d	Forsvarets operasjonsmedalje – Irak	Medal for Defence Operations Abroad – Iraq	
48e	Forsvarets operasjonsmedalje – Baltic Accession	Medal for Defence Operations Abroad – Operation Baltic Accession	
48f	Forsvarets operasjonsmedalje – Bosnia-Hercegovina	Medal for Defence Operations Abroad – Bosnia-Herzegovina	
48g	Forsvarets operasjonsmedalje – Sudan	Medal for Defence Operations Abroad – Sudan	
48h	Forsvarets operasjonsmedalje – Libanon	Medal for Defence Operations Abroad – Lebanon	
48i	Forsvarets operasjonsmedalje – Tsjad	Medal for Defence Operations Abroad – Chad	
48j	Forsvarets operasjonsmedalje – Somalia	Medal for Defence Operations Abroad – Somalia	
48k	Forsvarets operasjonsmedalje – Libya	Medal for Defence Operations Abroad – Libya	
48l	Forsvarets operasjonsmedalje – Syria	Medal for Defence Operations Abroad – escorting the destruction of Syria's chemical weapons	
48m	Forsvarets operasjonsmedalje – Mali	Medal for Defence Operations Abroad – Mali	
48n	Forsvarets operasjonsmedalje – Middelhavet	Medal for Defence Operations Abroad – Mediterranean Sea	
49		National Service Medal	
49a	Hærens vernedyktighetsmedalje	National Service Medal – Army	without and with stars
49b	Sjøforsvarets vernedyktighetsmedalje	National Service Medal – Navy	without and with stars
49c	Luftforsvarets vernedyktighetsmedalje	National Service Medal – Air Force	without and with stars
49d	Heimevernets vernedyktighetsmedalje	National Service Medal – National Guard	without and with stars
		For obvious reasons not worn on uniform:	
—	Forsvarets medalje for falne i strid	Killed in Action Medal	

=== Royal Family Orders ===
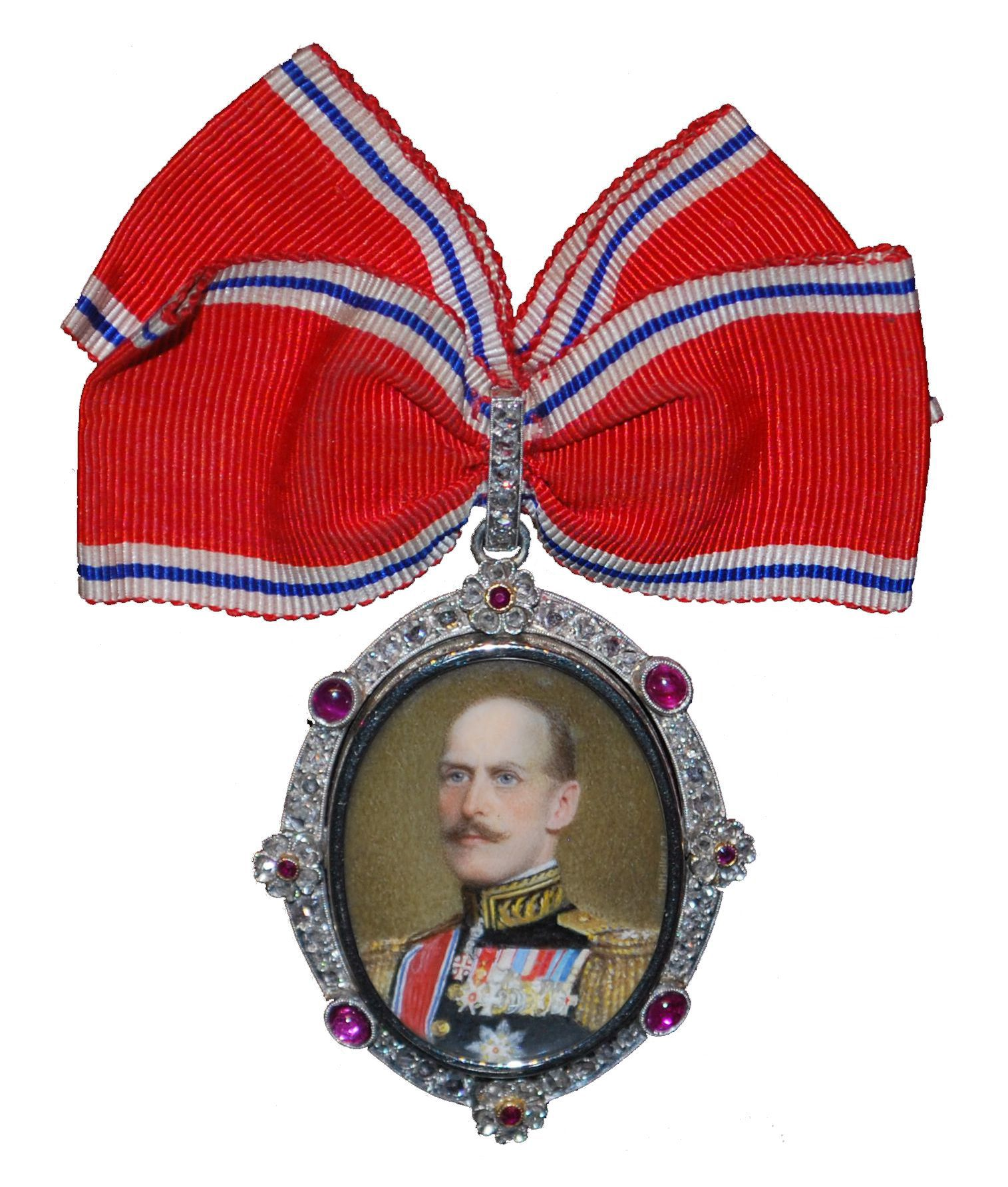
Royal Family order of King Haakon VII

- Royal Family Order of King Haakon VII of Norway (1906–1957)
- Royal Family Order of King Olav V of Norway (1957–1991)
- Royal Family Order of King Harald V of Norway (1991–2026)

These are not worn on military uniform.

== Group 2: Foreign state decorations ==
Decorations that are awarded or approved by foreign heads of state. They are ranked as follows: British, Danish, Finnish, Icelandic, Swedish, other countries are ranked alphabetically by their name in French.

== Group 3: Decorations of UN, NATO, EU, OSCE and similar ==
Decorations from international operations led by UN, NATO and other international organisations. The Multinational Force and Observers Medal is also placed in this group, so was the formerly approved PLANELM Medal. Medals are ranked by the year a mission started, oldest first.

== Group 4: Other Norwegian decorations ==
No.	Ribbon	Name in English	Note
1	Norsk Militært Tidsskrifts medalje for besvarelse av prisoppgave	Norwegian Military Journal's Medal for Answering a Prize Thesis	
2	Medaljen for lang og tro tjeneste	Royal Norwegian Society for Development's Medal for Long and Faithful Service	
3	Sjømilitære Samfunds medalje for besvarelse av prisoppgave	Naval Society's Medal for Answering a Prize Thesis	
4	Det frivillige Skyttervesens fortjenstmedalje	Norwegian Civilian Marksmanship Association's Medal of Merit	
5	Sjømilitære Samfunds fortjenstmedalje	Naval Society's Medal of Merit	
6	Norges Røde Kors hederstegn	Norwegian Red Cross' Badge of Honour	
7	Norske Reserveoffiserers Forbunds hederstegn	Norwegian Reserve Officers' Federation's Badge of Honour	without or with golden laurel branch
8	Norges Skytterforbunds hederstegn	Norwegian Shooting Association's Badge of Honour	
9	Norges militære kameratforbunds hederstegn	Norwegian Federation of Military Comrade Associations's Badge of Honour	
10	Norges Forsvarsforenings verneidrettsmedalje	The Norwegian Defense Association's Defense Sports Medal	
11	Det frivillige Skyttervesens hederstegn	Norwegian Civilian Marksmanship Association's Badge of Honour	
12	Krigsdeltagerforbundets hederstegn	War Participants' Association's Badge of Honour	
13	Hans Majestet Kongens Gardes medalje	His Majesty The King's Guard's Medal	gold, silver, bronze
14	De Norske Officerers Rideklubs hederstegn	The Norwegian Officers Riding Club's Badge of Honour	
15	Norges Forsvarsforenings hederstegn	The Norwegian Defense Association's Badge of Honour, and Honorary membership	same ribbon
16	Tysklandsbrigadens veteranmedalje	German Brigade Veterans Medal	
17	Norges Lotteforbunds hederstegn	The Norwegian Lotte Association's Badge of Honour	
18	Fredsprismedaljen 1988	UN's Peace Prize Medal 1988	
19	Norges Veteranforbund for Internasjonale Operasjoners hederstegn	Norwegian Veterans' Association for International Operations' Badge of Honour	gold, silver, bronze
20	Oslo Militære Samfunds hederstegn	Oslo Military Society's Badge of Honour	gold, silver, bronze
21	Luftmilitært Samfunds hederstegn	Air Force Society's Badge of Honour	
22	Norsk Aero Klubbs hederstegn	Norwegian Aero Club's Badge of Honour	
23	Politiets Afghanistanmedalje	Police Afghanistan Medal	
24	Hakon Hansens gullmedalje	Hakon Hansen's Gold Medal	
25	Forsvarets seniorforbunds hederstegn	The Defense Seniors Association' Badge of Honour	
26	Brigadeveteranforbundet Hederstegn	Brigade Veterans Association's Badge of Honour	
27	Holmenkollen Medal	Holmenkollen Medal	

== Group 5: Other foreign decorations ==
Foreign awards that do not fall into any of the groups above can be approved for use on Norwegian military uniform upon application. The order of wear as for group 2.

== Group 6: Medals awarded for military skills ==
Since 2008, the old medals were no longer approved worn on military uniform, and got replaced by the following medals in 2012:

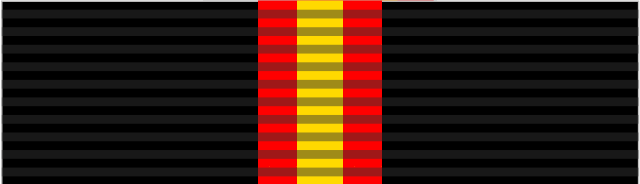
- Norwegian Defence Shooting Badge
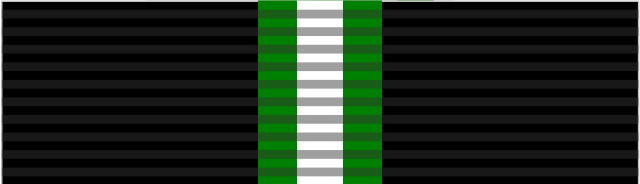
- Norwegian Defence military Sports Badge

=== Military Medals and Badges of Skills ===
These decorations are most often divided in three classes: bronze, silver and gold. They are most often awarded as metal badges, but if the gold requirements are met over several years a medal is awarded:

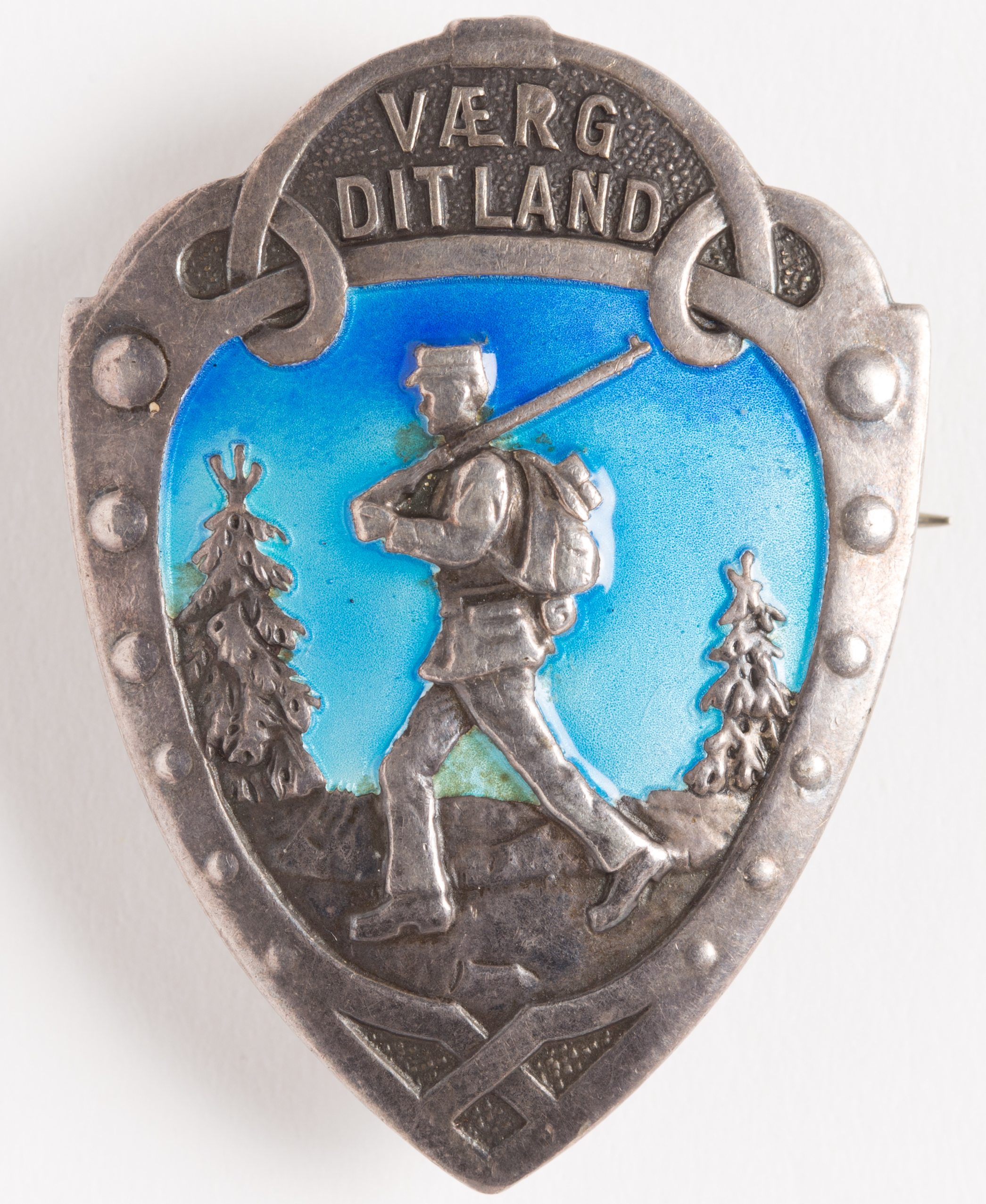
The Military Marching Badge(Norwegian Foot March)

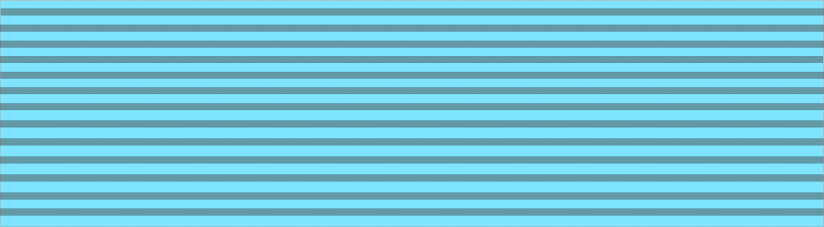
- The Military Marching Badge (30 km march with gear)
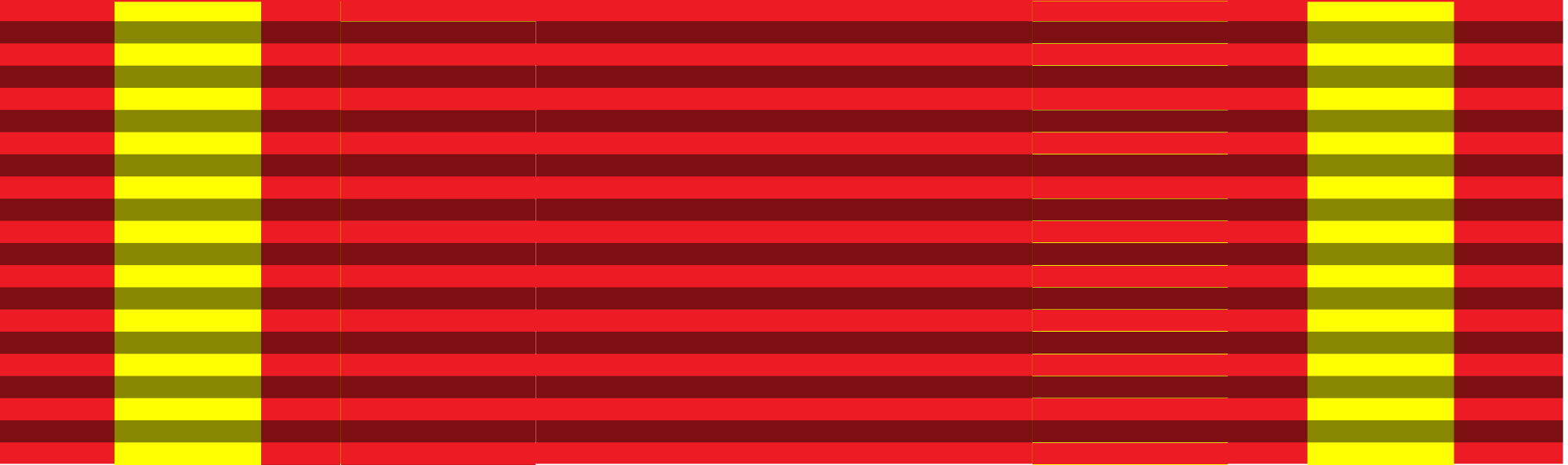
- The Military Sharp Shooting Badge (shooting)
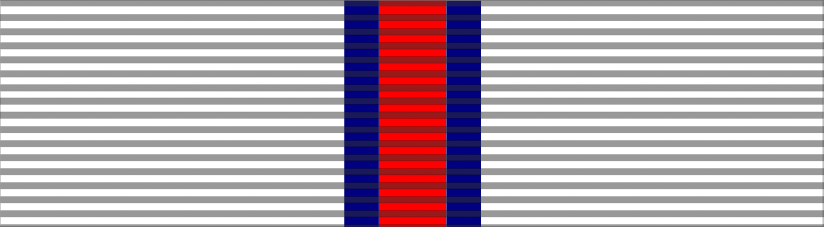
- The Military Skiing Badge (30 km skiing, including shooting)
- The Military Infantry Badge (infantry skills)
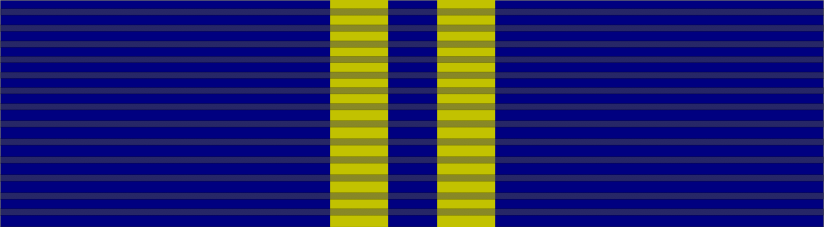
- The Military Sports Badge (military sports)
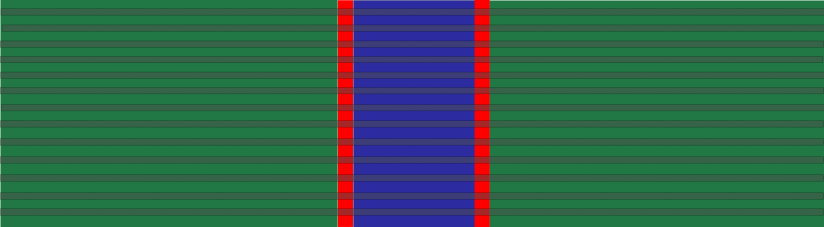
- The Military Penthathlon Badge (Military pentathlon)

Since 2008, the above medals are no longer approved worn on military uniform. The requirements for these medals can be a part of earning the current military medals

=== Civilian Medals of Skills ===
These share most of the characteristics of the badges and medals awarded for military skills, but the requirements may vary more:

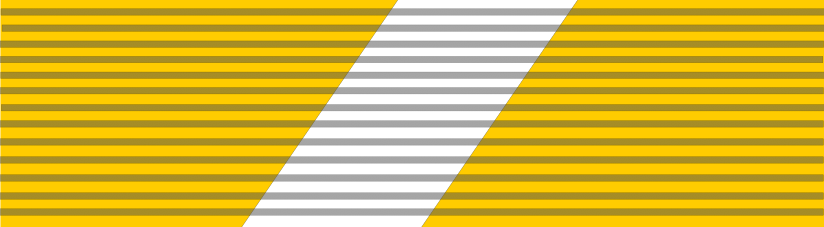
- Norwegian Civilian Marksmanship Association's merit badge (shooting)
- Norwegian Confederation of Sports Medal (sports)
- Norwegian Swimming Federation's «The big seahorse» (swimming)
- Norwegian Shooting Association's army rifle medal (NAIS-medal) (shooting)
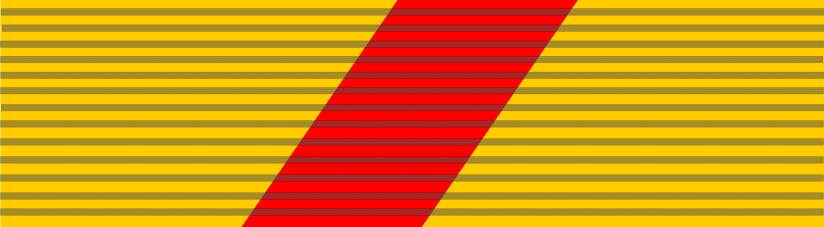
- Norwegian Civilian Marksmanship Association's biathlon medal ( –1983) / Norwegian Biathlon Association's medal (1983– ) (biathlon)

Since 2008, the above medals are no longer approved worn on military uniform. The requirements for these medals can be a part of earning the current military medals.

Additional civilian skills medal no longer approved worn on military uniform:

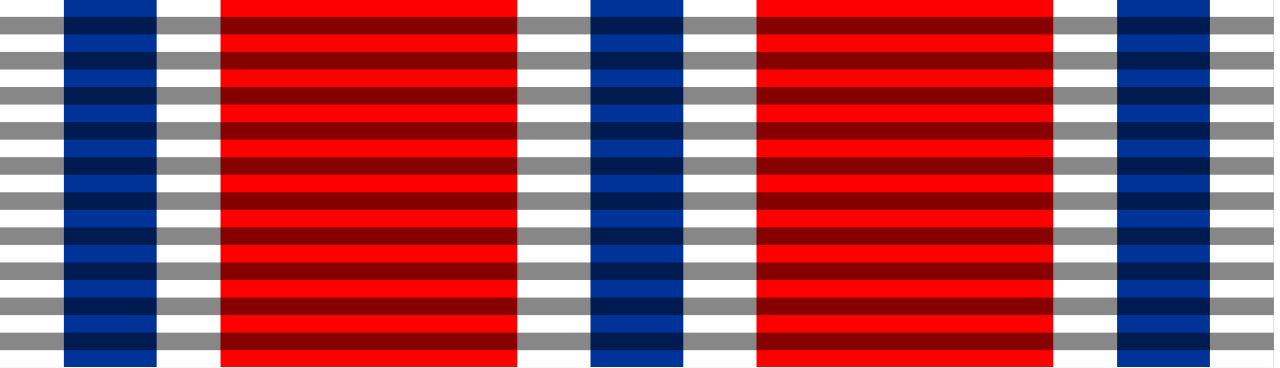
- Norwegian Civilian Marksmanship Association's medal of shooting (gold), also known as DFS organization medal (shooting) – Old ribbon version, the current is the same as the silver medal.
- Norwegian Civilian Marksmanship Association's medal of shooting (silver), also known as DFS organization medal (shooting).

== Foreign medals of skills ==
Foreign military and civilian skill medals are generally not permitted to be used on Norwegian military uniforms, unless permission has been applied and granted. Such skill medals then rank very last, after all other awards and skill marks.

The following foreign skill mark is approved:

- Cross for the Four Day Marches

== Unit citations ==
The Norwegian Armed Forces does not have any unit citations.

Norwegian personnel who have fought in departments that have been honored with a foreign unit citation or unit award and who have received a ribbon as a sign of this, are allowed to wear these on Norwegian military uniform, but then separate from other ribbon stripes and located below these.

Unit citations in the form of ribbons are not worn with medals.

Examples of foreign unit citations given to Norwegian personnel:

- Republic of Korea Presidential Unit Citation, South Korea
- Army Meritorious Unit Commendation, USA
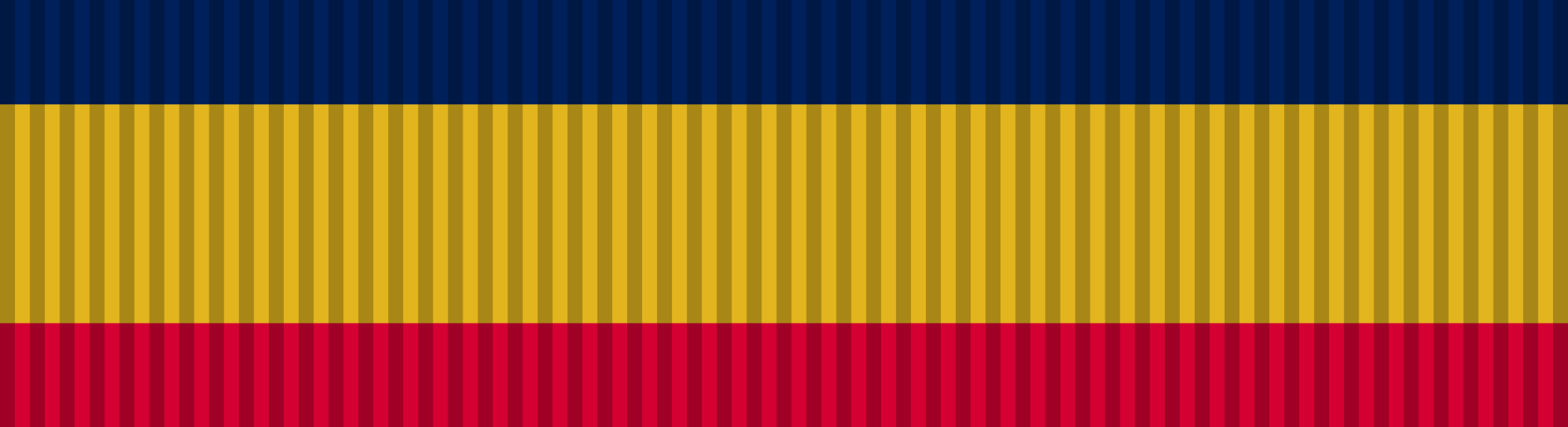
- Navy Presidential Unit Citation, USA
- Joint Meritorious Unit Award, USA

== No longer awarded ==
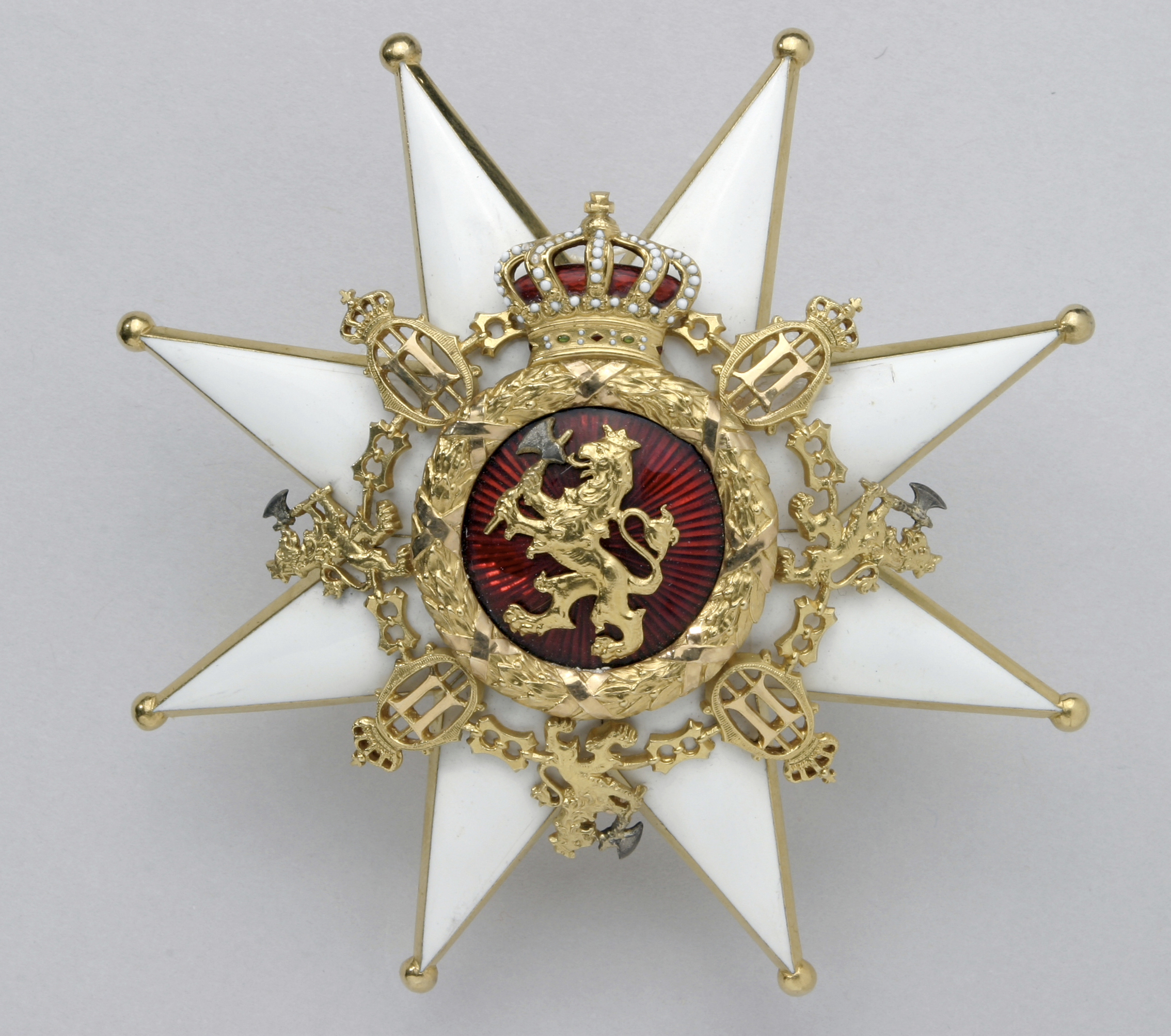
Star of the Order of the Norwegian lion

The following obsolete awards are no longer approved on military uniform:

- The Royal Norwegian Order of the Norwegian Lion
- Military cross with sword
- Military cross
- Armed Forces Medal for Heroic Deeds with Golden Laurel Branch
- PLANELM Medal, awarded to the Planning Element staff in SHIRBRIG

The Military cross, in both versions, are since 2014 no longer approved worn on military uniform. Personnel still serving got it converted to other medals. Similarly has the Medal for International Operations with Golden Laurel Branch been converted for personnel still serving.

Approved worn on military uniform in the years 1961–1981:

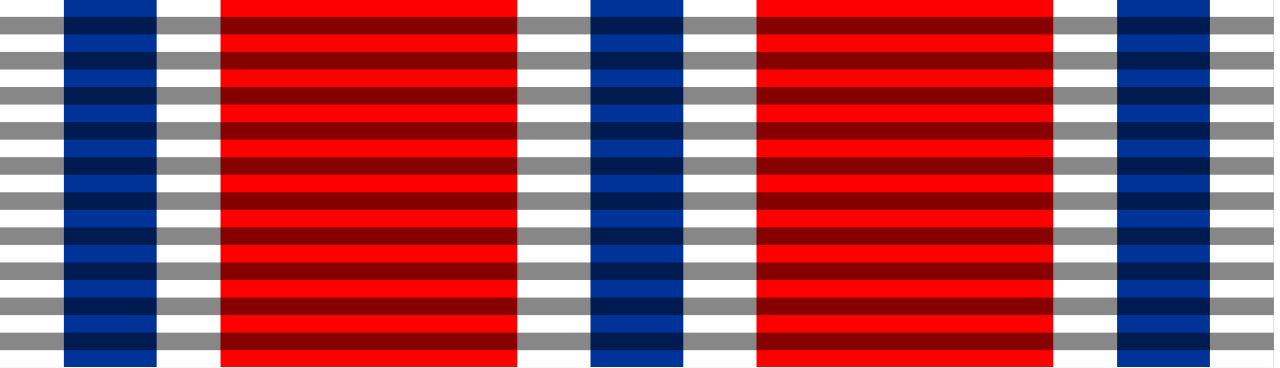
- Norwegian Confederation of Sports' 100 Years Anniversary Medal

== See also ==
- List of Norwegian Honours awarded to Heads of State and Royals
- List of honours of the Norwegian Royal Family by country
