= Norwegian Medal of Merit =

Norwegian Medal of Merit may refer to:

- King's Medal of Merit
- Norwegian Army Medal of Merit, a medal of Norway
- Norwegian Air Force Medal of Merit, a medal of Norway
- Norwegian Navy Medal of Merit, a medal of Norway
- Norwegian Intelligence Service Medal of Merit, a medal of Norway
- Norwegian Home Guard Medal of Merit, a medal of Norway
