= Trond Johansen =

Norwegian intelligence officer (1924–2026)

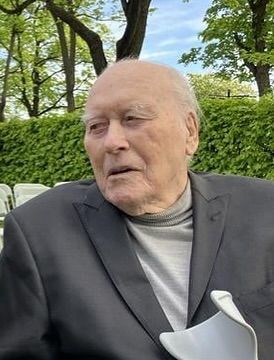
- Johansen in 2025
- Born: 13 May 1924; Drammen, Norway
- Died: 19 June 2026 (aged 102)
- Occupation: Intelligence officer
- Years active: 1943–1994
- Employer: Norwegian Intelligence Service
- Awards: Norwegian Defence Cross of Honour

Trond Johansen (13 May 1924 – 19 June 2026) was a Norwegian intelligence officer. He served with the Norwegian Intelligence Service for nearly 50 years, and was decorated with the Norwegian Defence Cross of Honour.

== Background ==
Johansen was born in Drammen on 13 May 1924.

He turned 100 on 13 May 2024, and took part in a reception held at the Akershus Fortress. At the age of 101, he still read five newspapers every day. Johansen died in June 2026, at the age of 102.

=== Reactions ===
Norwegian Prime Minister Jonas Gahr Støre called Johansen a legend and the last of his generation in Norwegian security and defence politics. He described Johansen as central in the development of Norwegian intelligence after the Second World War.

Former prime minister Jens Stoltenberg called Johansen an outstanding person and friend, a resistance fighter, societal entrepreneur, and social democrat.

Head of the Norwegian Armed Forces, Eirik Kristoffersen, thanked Johansen for his contributions to the defence in Norway, and added that their personal friendship had meant much for him.

Head of the Norwegian Intelligence Service, Nils Andreas Stensønes, pointed out that Johansen had had great significance for the intelligence service.

== Career ==
=== Intelligence ===
During the German occupation of Norway Johansen engaged in resistance against the occupants, first by distributing illegal newspapers. In 1943 he was sentenced to forced labour at a Wehrmacht office. Having access to various documents, he smuggled out copies which he delivered to the intelligence organisation XU. From 1944 these included reports on shipments of German troops from harbors in the Oslofjord, until he had to flee to Sweden in 1945.

After the Second World War, Johansen was recruited to Adm.T.P., the section for repatriation of German personnel, led by Vilhelm Evang. From 1949 he was responsible for security at the Independent Norwegian Brigade Group in Germany, and spent several years in Germany. From 1955 he was attached to the Norwegian embassy in Bonn.

From 1959 he headed a liaison group responsible for clandestine operations. In the 1960s he took part in meetings regarding signal intelligence with American agencies, including the Office of Naval Intelligence and the National Security Agency.

From 1977 he headed the Norwegian Intelligence Service section D, responsible for special information collecting and analysis. He assumed the position of assisting director in 1992, and retired from the Norwegian Intelligence Service in 1994.

Johansen was awarded the Norwegian Defence Cross of Honour, and was the first recipient of the Norwegian Intelligence Service Medal of Merit.

=== Politician ===
A politician, Johansen was a member of the Labour Party commission for security and foreign policy, and was advisor to central Labour politicians.
