= Antarctic Medal =

Antarctic Medal Antarktismedaljen
- Ribbon bar of the medal
- Type: Commemorative medal
- Awarded for: Service to the Norwegian-British-Swedish Antarctic Expedition
- Presented by: Norway
- Eligibility: Members of the Sixth Norwegian Antarctic Expedition.
- Status: No longer awarded
- Established: 3 February 1960

Highlights
- Total: 37

Precedence
- Next (higher): Maudheim medal
- Next (lower): H. M. The King's Commemorative Medal in Gold
- Related: King's Medal of Merit

The Antarctic Medal is a civil decoration of Norway. Established by King Olav V on 3 February 1960, it was awarded to the individuals associated with the Sixth Norwegian Antarctic Expedition. The medal ranks 27th in the order of precedence of Norwegian honours. The medal ranks below the Maudheim medal, but above H. M. The King's Commemorative Medal in Gold. The medal was awarded to 37 individuals who were part of or associated with Sixth Norwegian Antarctic Expedition.

== Recipients ==
The following are the 37 recipients of the medal:

- Roald Bendikt Alstad
- Bernt Arnvid Brandal
- Henry Rudolf Bjerke
- Nils Martin Bomstad
- Atle Brundtland
- Astor Ottar Kristian Ernstsen
- Odd Gjeruldsen
- Bjørn Grytøyr
- Kaare Johan Hansen
- Sigurd Gunnarson Helle
- Hans-Martin Henriksen
- Gudmunn Hermansen
- Lars Anton Hochlin
- Tor Hølen
- John Jakobsen
- Leif Jakobsen
- Rolf Leino Johnson
- Per Konrad Larsen
- Bernhard Luncke
- Torbjørn Lunde
- Jan Petter Haakon Madsen
- Henrik Marø
- Niels Stockfleth Nergaard
- Gunnar Nilsen
- Gudmund Odden
- Sverre Olaf Pettersen
- John Snuggerud
- Bjarne Stamsø
- Sigurd Svindland
- Haakon Sæther
- Stein Severin Sørensen
- Odd William Thoresen
- Tønnes Jarl Tønnesen
- Torgny Emil Vinje
- Anders Vinten-Johansen
- Thore Schanke Winsnes
- Knut Ødegaard
