= Medal of Heroism =

Medal of Heroism may refer to:

- Medal of Heroism (Czech Republic), an award of the Czech Republic
- ROTC Medal for Heroism, an award of the Department of the Army for ROTC cadets
- Armed Forces Medal for Heroic Deeds, presented by Norway
