= Medal for Heroic Deeds =

Norwegian civil award

Medal for Heroic Deeds Medaljen for edel dåd
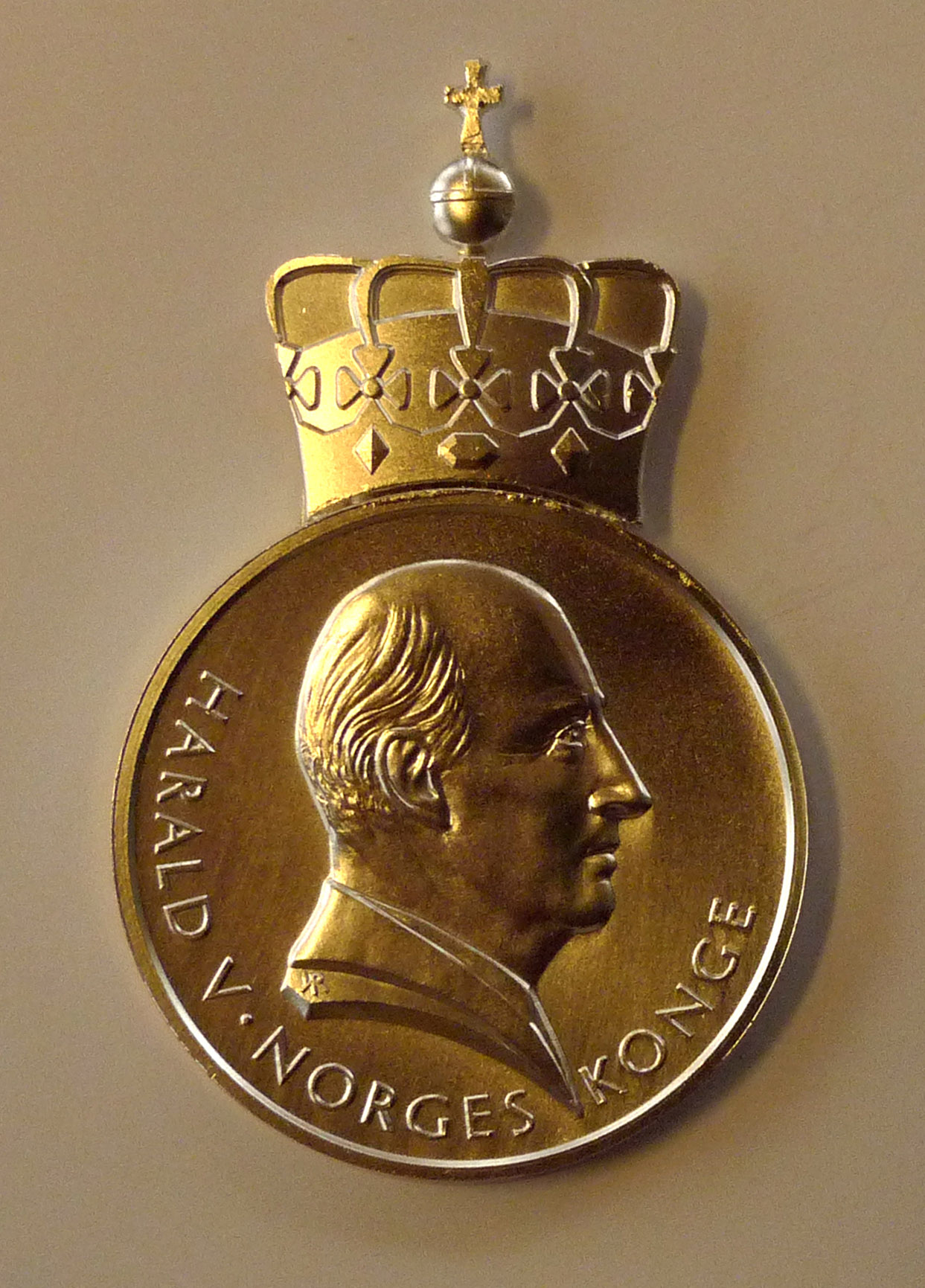
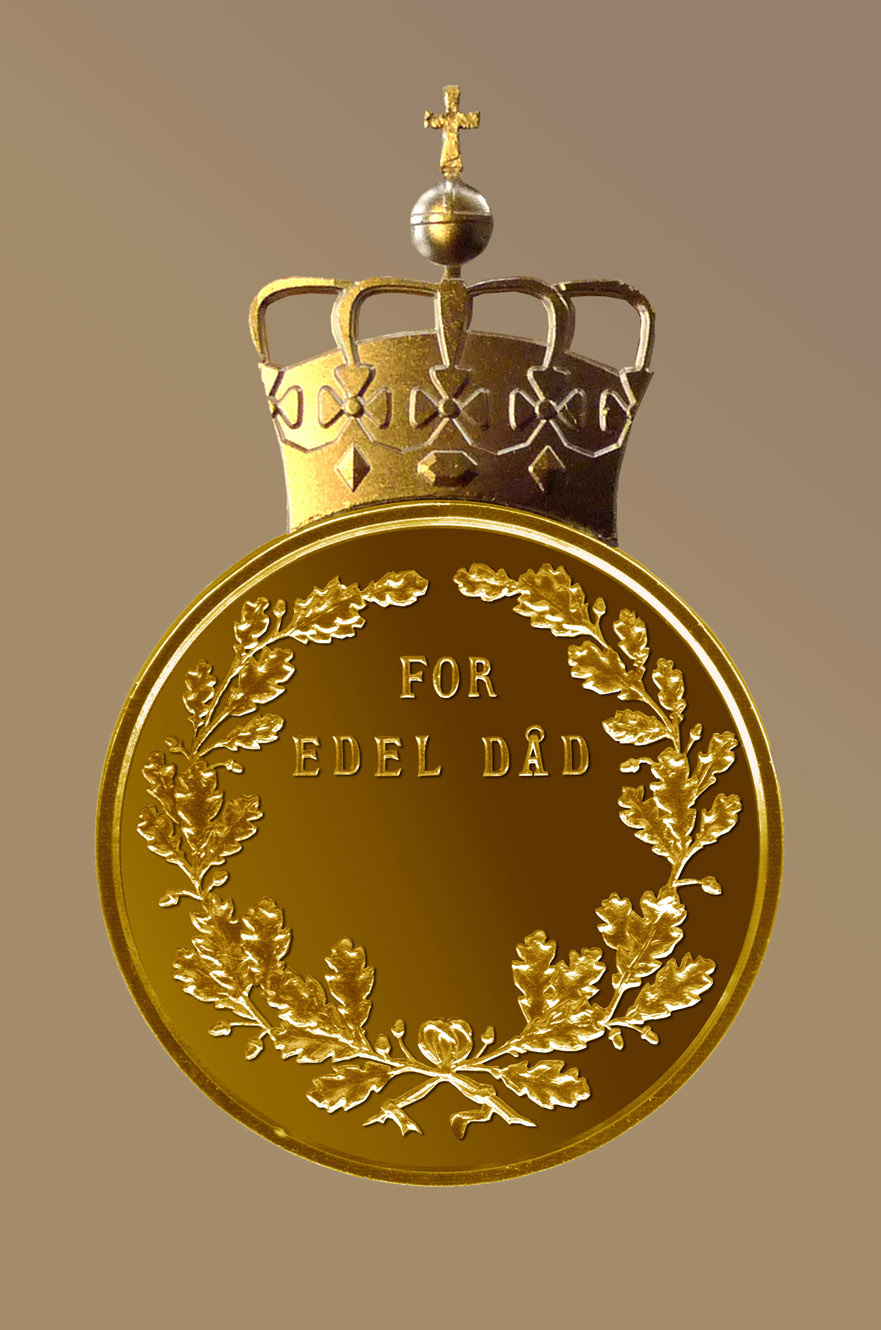
- Obverse and reverse of the medal in gold
- Type: Two grade medal (Gold and Silver)
- Presented by: Norway
- Established: 19 August 1885
- Ribbon bar of the medal

Precedence
- Next (higher): St. Olav's Medal With Oak Branch (Gold); King Haakon VII's Medal of Liberty (Silver)
- Next (lower): King's Medal of Merit (Gold); Medal for Rescue at Sea (Silver)

The Medal for Heroic Deeds was instituted in Norway by royal resolution on 19 August 1885 and is awarded for honorable actions in saving lives or a comparable act. There were originally three classes, but from 1905 the medal has only been awarded in gold and silver. To be awarded in gold the recipient must have committed an unusually notable rescue of life where the rescuer's life was put at risk. The medal is surmounted by the Crown of Norway and the adverse side features the portrait, name and title of the reigning monarch. At present the portrait is of King Harald V of Norway, and the inscription reads «Harald den 5, Norges Konge» (Harald the fifth, King of Norway). The reverse features an oak wreath and the words «For edel dåd» (For noble deed). The ribbon is in the national colours of Norway: red, white and blue.

== See also ==
- Orders, decorations, and medals of Norway
