= Civil Defence Cross of Honour =

Norwegian Civil Defence Cross of Honour Sivilforsvarets hederskors
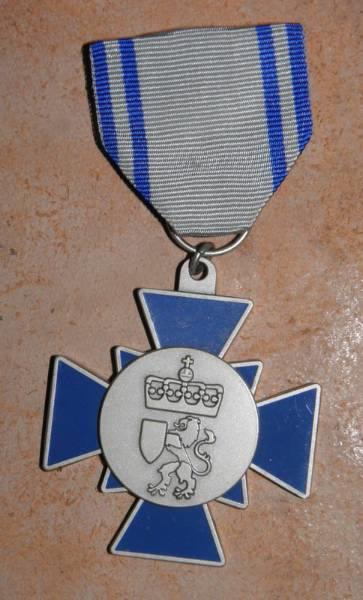
- Type: Medal
- Awarded for: Assisting the Norwegian civil defence in a particularly meritorious manner
- Presented by: Norway
- Status: Currently awarded
- Established: 6 November 2003
- Norwegian Civil Defence Cross of Honour ribbon

Precedence
- Next (higher): Nansen medal for Outstanding Research
- Equivalent: Norwegian Police Cross of Honour; Norwegian Defence Cross of Honour
- Next (lower): Defence Service Medal with Laurel Branch

The Civil Defence Cross of Honour (Norwegian: Sivilforsvarets hederskors; Nynorsk: Sivilforsvarets heiderskross) is a medal which is awarded by the Directorate for Civil Protection and Emergency Planning of Norway to Norwegian civil defence personnel for helping to prevent loss of life or damage to equipment and property by act of ingenuity in perilous conditions. The medal was established 6 November 2003.

== Appearance of the Award ==
- The Civil Defence Cross of Honour is a silver cross.
- The obverse has blue-enamelled arms and a central medallion bearing a crowned lion holding a shield (the Civil Defence emblem).
- The reverse is plain silver, with Honor et caritas (Honour and Charity) inscribed in the centre.
- The ribbon is white/silver-grey with a double blue edge stripe.
