= Maudheim medal =

Norwegian commemorative medal

Maudheim medal Maudheimmedaljen
- Ribbon bar of the medal
- Type: Medal
- Awarded for: Commemorative medal for the Norwegian-British-Swedish Antarctic Expedition
- Presented by: Norway
- Eligibility: Members of the Norwegian-British-Swedish Antarctic Expedition.
- Status: No longer awarded
- Established: 14 November 1951

Highlights
- Total: 18

Precedence
- Next (higher): Norwegian Korea Medal
- Next (lower): Antarctic Medal
- Related: King's Medal of Merit

The Maudheim medal (Maudheimmedaljen) was instituted by King Haakon VII of Norway on 14 November 1951 in honor of the members of the Norwegian-British-Swedish Antarctic Expedition of 1949–1952, awarded to the participants of the expedition. This expedition was the first to Antarctica involving an international team of scientists. During the expedition, a base known as Maudheim was established on the Quar Ice Shelf along the coast of Queen Maud Land in February 1950. The medal itself is the same as the King's Medal of Merit in Silver with the addition of a silver buckle on the ribbon with the inscription "MAUDHEIM 1949-1952". Only 18 people were awarded with the Maudheim Medal.

== Recipients ==
=== Norwegian ===
- John Schjelderup Giæver
- Nils Roer
- Nils Jørgen Schumacher
- Egil Gunnar Rogstad
- Peter Jul Melleby
- Bjarne Lorentzen

=== Swedish ===
- Stig Valter Schytt
- Gösta Hjalmar Liljequist
- Stig Eugen Hallgren
- Paul Ove Wilson
- Bertil Ekström (Post Mortem)

=== British ===
- Gordon de Quetteville Robin
- Charles Winthrop Molesworth Swithinbank
- Alan Williams Reece
- Ernest Frederik Roots
- John Ellis Jelbart (Post Mortem)
- Leslie Arthur Quar (Post Mortem)

== See also ==
- Orders, decorations, and medals of Norway
