= King Haakon VII Commemorative Medal =

King Haakon VII Commemorative Medal Kong Haakon VIIs minnemedalje
- Ribbon bar
- Country: Norway
- Established: October 1, 1957

Precedence
- Next (higher): Royal House Centennial Medal; Kongehusets 100-årsmedalje
- Next (lower): King Haakon VII 1905–1930 Jubilee Medal; Kong Haakon VIIs jubileumsmedalje 1905-1930

The King Haakon VII Commemorative Medal of October 1, 1957 (Norwegian: Kong Haakon VIIs minnemedalje 1. oktober 1957) is a Norwegian award created to commemorate the deceased monarch on the occasion of his funeral. King Haakon's funeral took place on October 1, 1957. The medal ranks 30th in the Norwegian decoration order of precedence.

== Description ==
The medal is made of gold or silver, and the obverse depicts King Haakon VII. The king is depicted without his crown in an image created by the engraver Ivar Throndsen. The portrait is surrounded by the inscription "HAAKON • VII • NORGES • KONGE •" (Haakon VII King of Norway). The reverse shows the royal monogram. The medal is fitted to a royal crown and hangs from a red medal ribbon. The medal ribbon has a silver clasp reading "1. OKTOBER 1957" (October 1, 1957).

== Conferral ==
The commemorative medal was awarded to persons that performed duties in connection with the king's funeral. The gold medal was awarded 26 times, mostly to members of the military. The silver medal was awarded 54 times; 48 medals were conferred upon officers of the army, navy, and air force that headed honor detachments at the funeral.
