= Police Service Medal =

- Norwegian: Politimedaljen
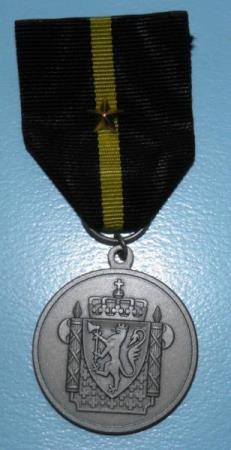
- A Police Service Medal with one star
- Type: Medal
- Country: Norway
- Established: 1 March 2002; 23 years ago
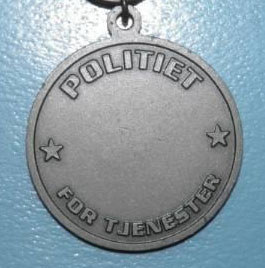
- Reverse of the Medal

Precedence
- Next (higher): Defence Service Medal
- Next (lower): Civil Defence Service Medal

The Police Service Medal (Norwegian: Politimedaljen) is a Norwegian civil decoration for long service in the Norwegian Police Service.

The medal is awarded after 25 years of service with the Norwegian Police Service. A star is awarded for each additional five years of service, up to a maximum of three stars, or 40 years of service.

The Police Service Medal is 41st in the Norwegian order of precedence.

Police Service Medal Ribbons
Ordinary (25 years)	One Star (30 years)	Two Stars (35 years)	Three Stars (40 years)

== See also ==
- Orders, decorations, and medals of Norway
- Norwegian Police Service
