= National Service Medal (Norway) =

Norwegian service medal for completion of mandatory military service

Forsvarets vernedyktighetsmedalje
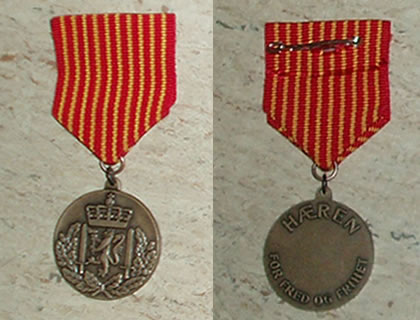
- Army version National Service Medal
- Type: Single-grade medal
- Awarded for: Completion of mandatory military service.
- Presented by: the Norwegian Defence Force
- Eligibility: Personnel who have completed mandatory military service.
- Status: Still awarded

Precedence
- Next (higher): Medal for Defence Operations Abroad

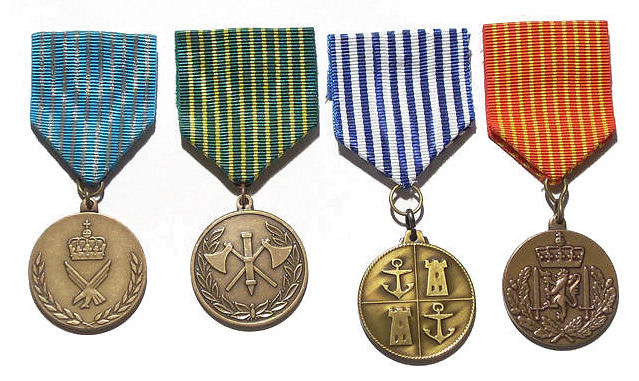
National Service Medal for service in the Air Force, Home Guard, Navy and Army

The Norwegian National Service Medal is awarded upon completion of mandatory military service (usually one year, six months for the Home Guard). The medal exists in four versions, one for each branch of service (army, air force, navy and home guard).

The front of the medal shows the crest of the service branch, and the reverse has the name of the branch and the armed forces motto "for fred og frihet" (bm) or "for fred og fridom"(nn) ("for peace and freedom").

National Service Medal ribbons
Air Force	Home Guard	Navy	Army
Air Force ribbon	National Guard ribbon	Navy ribbon	Army ribbon

== See also ==
- Norwegian orders and medals
