= King Haakon VII 1905–1955 Jubilee Medal =

King Haakon VII 1905–1955 Jubilee Medal Kong Haakon VIIs jubileumsmedalje 1905–1955
- Ribbon bar
- Type: medal
- Country: Norway
- Established: 1955

Precedence
- Next (higher): King Haakon VII 1905–1930 Jubilee Medal; Kong Haakon VIIs jubileumsmedalje 1905-1930
- Next (lower): Haakon VII 70th Anniversary Medal; Haakon VIIs 70-årsmedalje

The King Haakon VII 1905–1955 Jubilee Medal (Norwegian: Kong Haakon VIIs jubileumsmedalje 1905–1955), also known as the King's Jubilee Medal (Norwegian: Kongens jubileumsmedalje), is a Norwegian award instituted in November 1955 by Haakon VII of Norway in honor of the 50th anniversary of his accession to the throne. The medal ranks 32nd in the Norwegian decoration order of precedence.

== Conferral ==
The jubilee medal was mostly awarded to members of the royal family, members of the Norwegian government, heads of the Norwegian Parliament, Supreme Court justices, members of the Royal Court, members of the Royal Palace, prominent officials and military personnel, and foreign ambassadors and diplomats.

Royal recipients of the King Haakon VII 1905–1955 Jubilee Medal include Crown Prince Olav and Prince Harald. Other prominent recipients include Ingvald Smith-Kielland of the Royal Court, the politician Kornelius Bergsvik, and the journalist and politician C. J. Hambro.

== Description ==
The King Haakon VII 1905–1955 Jubilee Medal is made of silver. The obverse depicts King Haakon VII with the inscription "Haakon VII Norges konge" (Haakon VII King of Norway). The medal is fitted to a royal crown and hangs from a red medal ribbon. The medal ribbon has a silver clasp reading "1905–1955."
