= Norwegian Korea Medal =

Norwegian campaign medal

- Country: Norway
- Campaign(s): Campaign medal
- Established: 29 April 1955; 69 years ago
- Ribbon

The Norwegian Korea Medal (Norwegian: Den norske Koreamedalje) was a campaign medal awarded by the Norwegian government for at least two months of service at the Norwegian Mobile Army Surgical Hospital during the Korean War. The medal was instituted on 29 April 1955.

The medal is 25th in the order of precedence, below The King's Medal of Merit for Service in the Home Guard, and above the Maudheim medal.

== See also ==
- Orders, decorations, and medals of Norway
- Norwegian Mobile Army Surgical Hospital (NORMASH)
