= King Haakon VII Freedom Cross =

Haakon VII's Freedom Cross Haakon VIIs Frihetskors
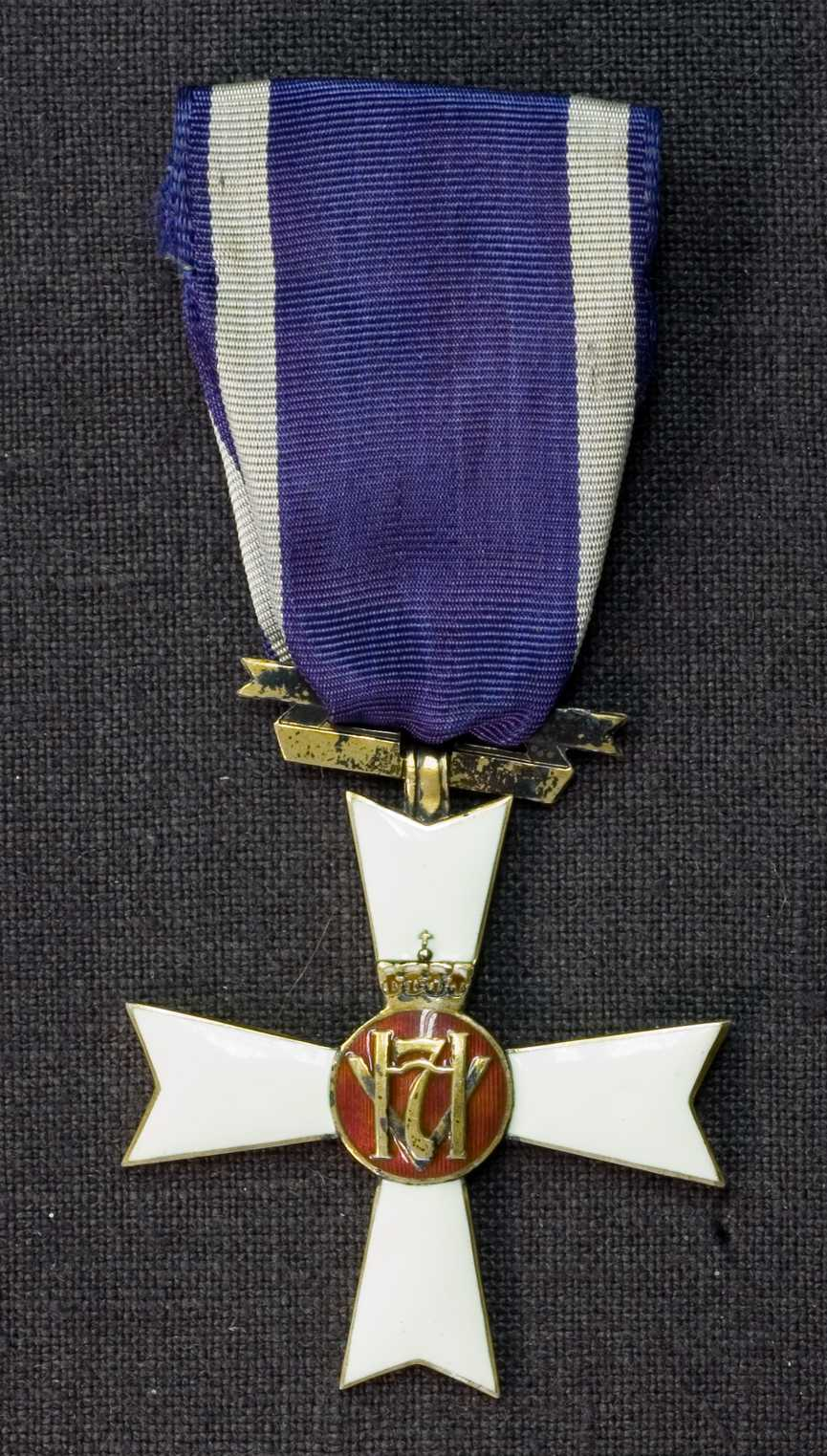
- King Haakon VII Freedom Cross
- Type: Single-grade medal
- Awarded for: Outstanding and decisive contributions to the Norwegian cause during World War 2
- Presented by: Norway
- Eligibility: Norwegian or foreign military or civilian personnel
- Established: 18 May 1945
- Ribbon bar of the medal

Precedence
- Next (higher): Royal Norwegian Order of Merit
- Next (lower): St Olav's medal with Oak Branch
- Related: King Haakon VII Freedom Medal

King Haakon VII's Freedom Cross (Norwegian: Haakon VIIs Frihetskors) was established in Norway on 18 May 1945. The medal is awarded to Norwegian or foreign military or civilian personnel for outstanding achievement in wartime. It is ranked fifth in the order of precedence in the Norwegian honours system.

== Description ==
The medal is in the shape of a Maltese cross. In the middle of the cross on the adverse side is a circular red field with the monogram of King Haakon VII over the letter V for victory in gilded silver. On the reverse side the following is engraved: "Alt for Norge 7 juni 1945" (All for Norway 7 June 1945), the seventh of June being the day the King came back to Norway after his five-year forced exile during World War II. The medal is hung from a blue ribbon with a narrow white stripe along both edges.

== See also ==
- Orders, decorations, and medals of Norway
