= Nils Andreas Sørensen =

Norwegian chemist

Nils Andreas Sørensen (8 December 1909 – 8 June 1987) was a Norwegian chemist and professor of organic chemistry at the Norwegian Technical College in Trondheim.

== Early life and education ==
Nils Andreas Sørensen was born in Kristiania (now Oslo), Norway. He was a son of Inge Sørensen (1875–1951) and Helene Raknerud (1879–1968), and was a grandson of newspaper editor Lars Raknerud. In 1936 he married chemical engineer Jørgine Stene (1905–1997) with whom he had worked in the lab of nutritional chemist Sigval Schmidt-Nielsen(sv) (1877–1956).

== Career ==
He earned his Ph.D. degree in 1937 and was appointed professor of organic chemistry at the Norwegian Institute of Technology from 1939 to 1977. He published about one hundred scientific papers with a primary focus on carbohydrates, carotenoids and natural acetylene compounds. In addition to the field of organic chemistry, he also contributed to botanics. He collaborated with his wife Jørgine Stene on many of his projects and they co-wrote twenty five joint publications. In 1938, the couple worked with chemist Richard Kuhn (1900–1967) in Heidelberg on the study of astaxanthin which resulted in a joint publication in Berichte der deutschen chemischen Gesellschaft in 1939.

During the Second World War, Sørensen was arrested by Nazi German occupying forces in 1943 and was imprisoned for two years. Sørensen was a member of the Norwegian Academy of Science and Letters and the Royal Danish Academy of Sciences and Letters. He was an honorary member of Norsk Kjemisk Selskab, and received the Nansen medal for Outstanding Research. Sørensen was decorated Knight, First Class of the Order of St. Olav in 1965. A sculpture of Sørensen by Johannes Block Hellum is located at the Norwegian University of Science and Technology.
