= King Harald V's Jubilee Medal 1991–2016 =

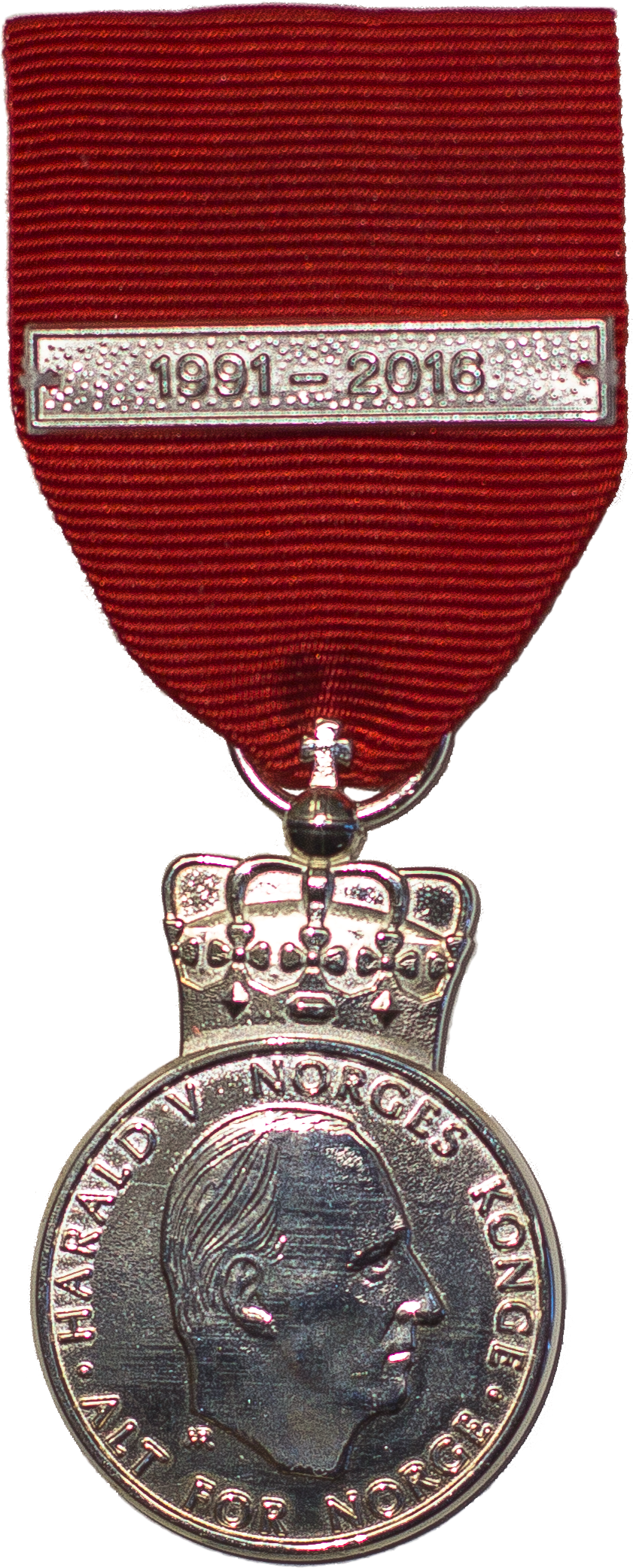
- King Harald V's Jubliee Medal
- Type: Medal
- Awarded for: Awarded to all who have assisted the King and royal family in their work.
- Presented by: The Monarchy of Norway
- Status: No longer awarded
- Established: 17 January 2016
- Final award: 17 January 2016

Highlights
- Total recipients: 602
- Ribbon of King Harald V's Jubilee Medal

Precedence
- Next (higher): Olav V's Centenary Medal
- Next (lower): H. M. The King's Commemorative Medal in Silver

The King Harald V's Jubilee Medal 1991–2016 (Norwegian: Kong Harald Vs jubileumsmedalje 1991-2016) was a commemorative medal created on 17 January 2016 to mark the 25th anniversary of King Harald V's accession in 1991. It is 38th in the order of precedence with King Olav's Centenary Medal being just above it, and H. M. The King's Commemorative Medal in silver being just below it.

== Design ==
The medal was engraved by Ingrid Austlid Rise, a medal and coin designer. It depicts on the obverse an effigy of the King and is circumscribed by the inscription HARALD V NORGES KONGE ALT FOR NORGE (Norwegian for "Harald V King of Norway all for Norway'). The reverse shows the crown monogram H5. The medal is worn with a red band with a sewn-on buckle with the text "1991-2016".
