= King Haakon VII Freedom Medal =

King Haakon VII Freedom Medal Haakon VIIs Frihetsmedalje
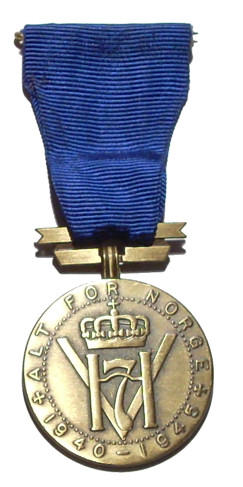
- Type: Single-grade medal
- Awarded for: Outstanding achievement during war
- Presented by: Norway
- Eligibility: Norwegian or foreign military or civilian personnel
- Established: 18 May 1945
- Ribbon bar of the medal

Precedence
- Next (higher): Armed Forces Medal for Heroic Deeds
- Next (lower): Medal for Heroic Deeds (Silver)

King Haakon VII's Medal of Liberty (Norwegian: Haakon VIIs Frihetsmedalje) was established on 18 May 1945. The medal is awarded to Norwegian or foreign military or civilian personnel for significant service to Norway during World War II. This service need not have been in direct contact with the enemy.

== Description of the Medal ==
- The medal is bronze, circular and suspended from the ribbon by a stylised bronze ribbon folded at both ends.
- The obverse bears the monogram of King Haakon VII over a letter V symbolising victory. This is surrounded by a circle of beads, outside of which is written ALT FOR NORGE 1940-1945 (ALL FOR NORWAY 1940-1945)
- The reverse is plain apart from a wreath of oak leaves, tied with a ribbon at the base.
- The ribbon is plain dark blue. When ribbons only are worn, the ribbon bears the King's monogram in bronze.

== See also ==
- King Haakon VIIs Freedom Cross
- Orders, decorations, and medals of Norway
