= Medal for Rescue at Sea =

Norwegian civil award

Medal for Rescue at Sea Medaljen for redningsdåd til sjøs
- Ribbon bar of the medal
- Awarded for: Demonstrated courage, resourcefulness, and skill for the saving of life at sea or other similar deed
- Presented by: Norway
- Eligibility: Individuals
- Established: 25 August 1978

Precedence
- Next (higher): Medal for Heroic Deeds in Silver
- Next (lower): Nansen Medal for Outstanding Research

The Medal for Rescue at Sea is a Norwegian award was instituted by Royal Decree on 25 August 1978. It ranks as number 14 in the order of precedence of the Orders, decorations, and medals of Norway.

== Award distribution ==
The medal is awarded by the Ministry of Trade and Industry, on the recommendation of the Norwegian Maritime Directorate. Individuals who have demonstrated courage, resourcefulness and skill for the saving of life at sea, are eligible for this award.

== Design ==
The Medal for Rescue at Sea is made of silver. The obverse shows the Coat of arms of Norway surrounded by the inscription "Kongeriket Norge" (Kingdom of Norway). On the reverse edge is the inscription "For Redningsdåd til Sjøs" (For Rescue at Sea) at the top with an oak wreath below. The medal is suspended from a ribbon of red with a white edged blue stripe in the middle, like the flag of Norway.
