= Jørgine Stene Sørensen =

Norwegian chemist and civil engineer (1905–1997)

Jørgine Stene Sorensen
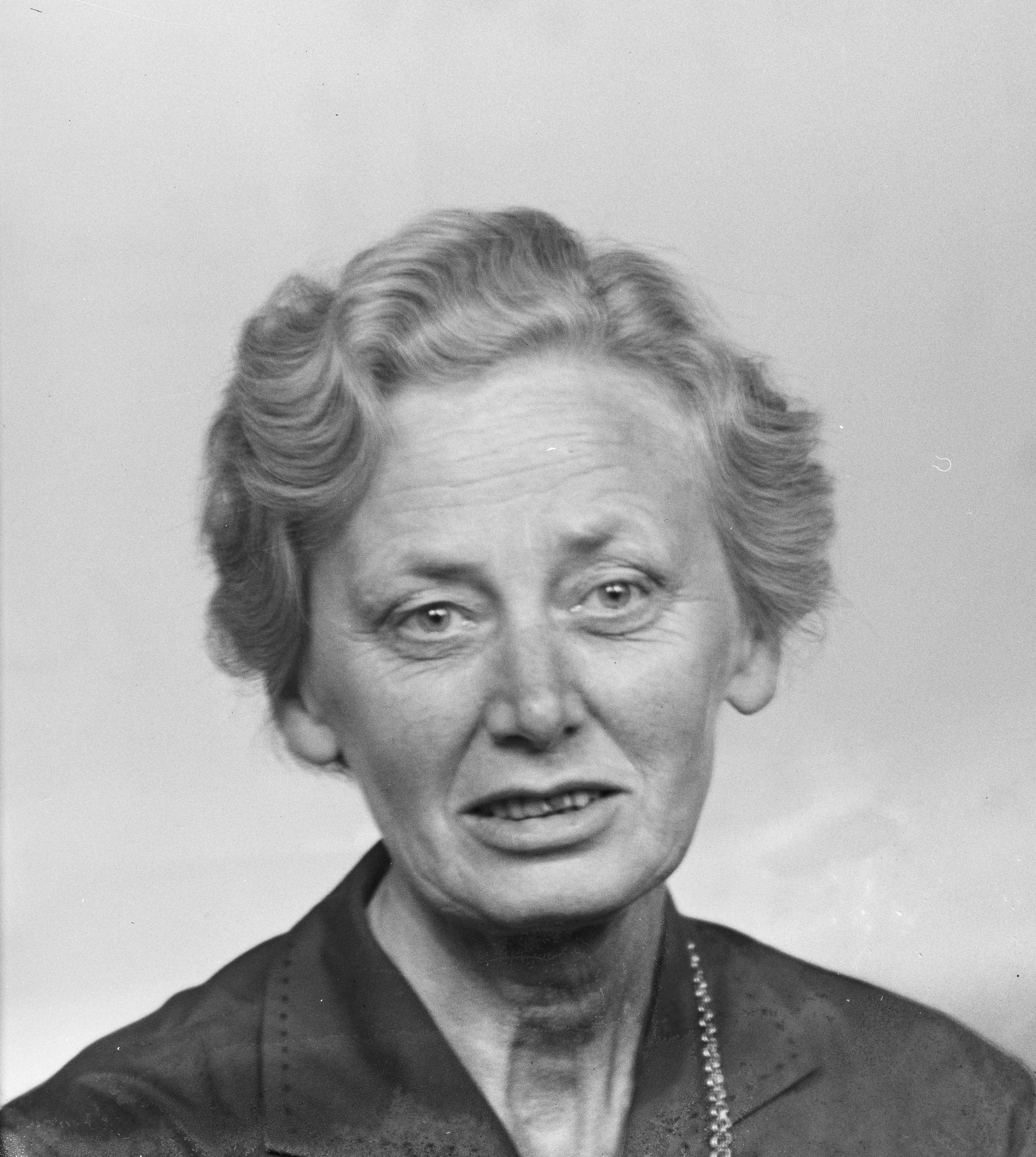
- Jørgine Stene Sorensen in 1962
- Born: Jørgine Stene; 15 October 1905; Trondheim
- Died: 12 April 1997 (aged 91)
- Education: Norwegian Institute of Technology
- Occupations: Chemist, civil engineer, academic
- Spouse: Nils Andreas Sørensen

Jørgine Stene Sørensen (née Stene; 15 October 1905 – 12 April 1997) was a Norwegian chemist and civil engineer. She was educated at the Norwegian Institute of Technology. She specialised as a chemical engineer, natural product chemist, especially interested in naturally occurring dyes in plants.

== Background ==
Jørgine Stene was the daughter of farmer Ole Stene and Berit Margrete Stene (née Gjervan) and grew up with her parents and four siblings on Nedre Gjervan farm by Jonsvatnet outside Trondheim. In 1925 she took her Examen artium at Trondheim Cathedral SchooL, and that same autumn she began studying at the Norwegian Institute of Technology (NTH) in Trondheim. She had chosen to study chemistry, and received good exam results.

== Chemist and researcher ==
Jørgine graduated as a chemical engineer from NTH in 1929, one of two women. The other was Turid Wik.

After completing her studies at NTH, she was a research assistant for Professor Sigval Schmidt-Nielsen until 1935. During this period, she met her future husband, later Professor Nils Andreas Sørensen, who was also a research assistant, first for Schmidt-Nielsen, then for Claus Riiber. Stene and Sørensen's first publication together is dated 1934.

Jørgine Stene married Nils Andreas Sørensen on 13 July 1936. From then on, she used both surnames.

In the period 1936–1938 she worked as a chemist at Nidar Chokoladefabrik. One of the products she helped develop was the porous chocolate Stratos, which is still on sale. One source says that she was central to this work, and that the chocolate was internally called "Jørgine chocolate".

The couple was in Heidelberg from January 1938 to July 1939, studying under Professor Dr. Richard Kuhn at the Kaiser Wilhelm Institute for Medical Research.

After her time at Nidar, she worked at the Department of Organic Chemistry. In July 1939, her husband was appointed professor, and from then on Stene Sørensen did not consider a career of her own. She became a scientific associate of her husband, Professor Nils Andreas Sørensen. Despite the important research she carried out, she referred to herself only as her husband's closest research associate for the rest of her professional career.

== From research on marine animals to basket plants ==
At the institute, she first participated in Sørensen's carotenoid studies. The research group managed to isolate carotenoids from marine animals, and conducted structural studies of the lobster's red pigment, astaxanthin. This dye is now added to the feed in salmon farming, to give the fish meat its pink color. During World War II, it was difficult to obtain raw materials from the sea, so they switched to studies of naturally occurring acetylene compounds in basket flowers, a completely new field that Sørensen's group opened up during World War II. This work led to a number of publications in the professional press, and the institute gradually gained an international reputation.

== Legacy ==
After the war, Jørgine Stene Sørensen co-authored 20 scientific publications. She was a member of both the Norwegian Chemical Society and the Norwegian Botanical Society and in 1957 was elected to the Norwegian Academy of Technological Sciences, a testament to her strong position as an independent researcher in the technical sciences.

A few decades after the war, Jørgine took back Nedre Gjervan farm on a farmstead, and she and her husband moved there, and lived there for the rest of their lives. The couple had no children. Jørgine Stene Sørensen lived alone on the farm after her husband died in 1987, and died there herself ten years later. The couple had bequeathed the farm to the Norwegian Forestry Society, but retained the right of occupancy.
