= King Haakon VII 1905–1930 Jubilee Medal =

King Haakon VII 1905–1930 Jubilee Medal Kong Haakon VIIs jubileumsmedalje 1905–1930
- Ribbon bar of the medal
- Type: Royal commemorative medal
- Awarded for: Commemoration of the 25th anniversary of the ascension of Haakon VII
- Presented by: The Royal House of Norway
- Established: 1930

Order of Wear
- Next (higher): King Haakon VII Commemorative Medal; Kong Haakon VIIs minnemedalje
- Next (lower): King Haakon VII 1905–1955 Jubilee Medal; Kong Haakon VIIs jubileumsmedalje 1905-1955

The King Haakon VII 1905–1930 Jubilee Medal (Norwegian: Kong Haakon VIIs jubileumsmedalje 1905–1930), also known as the King's Jubilee Medal (Norwegian: Kongens jubileumsmedalje), is a Norwegian award instituted in 1930 by Haakon VII of Norway in honor of the 25th anniversary of his accession to the throne. The medal has been conferred upon 397 people.

== Description ==
The King Haakon VII 1905–1930 Jubilee Medal is made of silver and is 33 mm in diameter. The obverse depicts King Haakon VII with the inscription "HAAKON • VII • NORGES • KONGE •" (Haakon VII King of Norway). The reverse shows the royal monogram. The medal was created by the engraver Ivar Throndsen. The medal is fitted to a royal crown and hangs from a red medal ribbon. The medal ribbon has a silver clasp reading "1905–1930."

Later the King Haakon VII 1905–1955 Jubilee Medal (Norwegian: Kong Haakon VIIs jubileumsmedalje 1905-1955), the King Haakon VII Commemorative Medal (Norwegian: Kong Haakon VIIs minnemedalje), and the King Haakon VII Centennial Medal (Norwegian: Kong Haakon VIIs 100-årsmedalje) were given the same design as the King Haakon VII 1905–1930 Jubilee Medal, but the ribbon clasps and inscriptions were modified to match the occasions they marked.
