= Badge of Honour for Fire Protection =

Thuringian award

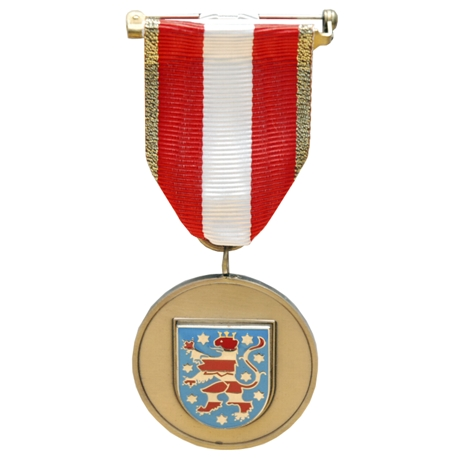
The first rank of the Badge, the Medal for Fire Protection

The Badge of Honour for Fire Protection (German: Brandschutzehrenzeichen) is an award of the Free State of Thuringia for extraordinary commitment given to members of fire brigades in five ranks.

Rank	German	Reason
Medal for Fire Protection on Ribbon	Brandschutzmedaille am Bande	10 years of true duty or benefits for fire protection
Silver Badge of Honour on Ribbon	Silbernes Brandschutzehrenzeichen am Bande	25 years of true duty or special benefits for fire protection
Golden Badge of Honour on Ribbon	Goldenes Brandschutzehrenzeichen am Bande	40 years of true duty or outstanding benefits for fire protection
Silver Cross for Fire Protection	Silbernes Brandschutzehrenzeichen als Steckkreuz	Extraordinary benefits for fire protection
Golden Cross for Fire Protection	Goldenes Brandschutzehrenzeichen als Steckkreuz	For brave behaviour on duty by danger of life
