= H. M. The King's Commemorative Medal =

H. M. The Kings Commemorative Medal H.M. Kongens Erindringsmedalje
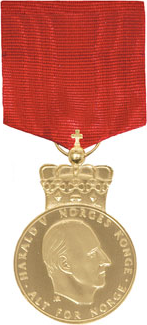
- H. M. The King's Commemorative Medal in gold
- Type: Two class medal (Gold and Silver)
- Awarded for: Meritorious service to the King
- Presented by: Norway
- Status: Currently awarded in limited numbers
- Established: 1906
- Final award: 2011
- Ribbon bar of the medal

Precedence
- Next (higher): Antarctic Medal (Gold); King Olav V's 100th Anniversary Medal (silver)
- Next (lower): The Royal House Centenary Medal (Gold); Defence Service Medal (Silver)

H.M. The King’s Commemorative Medal (Norwegian: H.M. Kongens erindringsmedalje) is a royal decoration of Norway. Established in 1906 by King Haakon VII, the medal is awarded to individuals for particularly meritorious service to the King. The medal is awarded in grades, gold and silver. The gold medal ranks 28th in the Norwegian order of wear just below the Antarctic Medal and above The Royal House Centenary Medal. The silver medal ranks 38th in the order of precedence below the King Olav V's 100th Anniversary Medal and above the Defence Service Medal.

== Appearance ==
The medal is round, in either gold or silver metal. The obverse of the medal bears the effigy of the reigning sovereign. The effigy is surrounded by the monarch's name and motto. In the case of the King Harald V, his effigy is right facing. Above is his name and title, HARALD V NORGES KONGE. Below is his motto, ALT FOR NORGE. The reverse of the medal depicts the monarch's monogram. The medal is surmounted by a depiction Crown of Norway. The medal is suspended by a ring suspension that runs through the orb on the crown. The ribbon of the medal is the red of the Flag of Norway.
