= Order of Vanuatu =

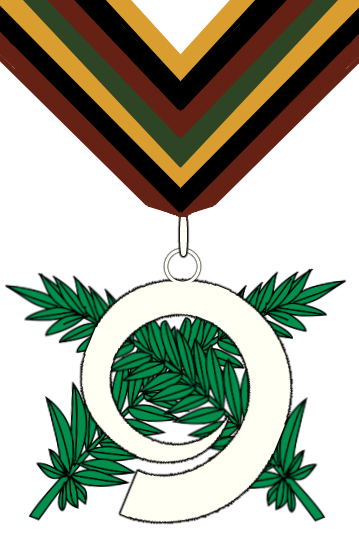
- Country: Vanuatu
- Grades: "Badge of Honour"; "Badge of Distinction"; "Vanuatu Distinguished Service Medal"; "Vanuatu Meritorious Service Medal"
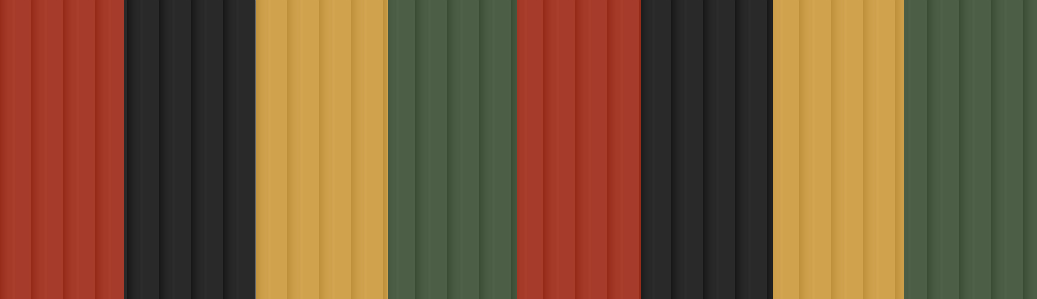
- Ribbon

The Order of Vanuatu has four grades.

- "Badge of Honour"
- "Badge of Distinction"
- "Vanuatu Distinguished Service Medal"
- "Vanuatu Meritorious Service Medal"

Every grade in this order has another ribbon, each in the colours red-green-yellow and black.

The New Hebrides, a French-British condominium became independent in 1980. In 1988 the government of Vanuatu founded a single order of merit.
