= Medal for Defence Operations Abroad =

Medal for Defence Operations Abroad Forsvarets operasjonsmedalje
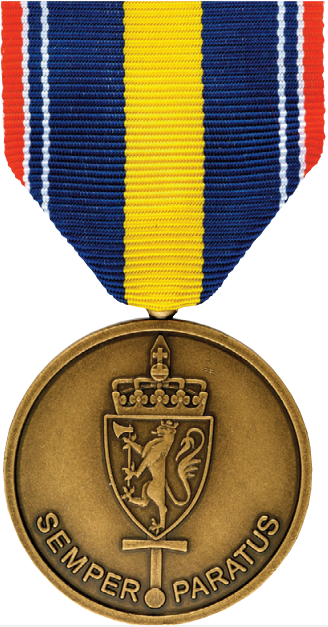
- Obverse of the medal for Bosnia-Herzegovina
- Type: Participant medal (Deltagermedaljer)
- Awarded for: 30 days service in an approved military operation abroad Prior to 1 April 2011, 90 days service.
- Country: Norway
- Presented by: the Chief of Defence
- Eligibility: Military personnel
- Status: Currently awarded
- Established: 1 April 2005

Precedence
- Next (higher): Medal for Defence Service Abroad
- Next (lower): National Service Medal

The Medal for Defence Operations Abroad (Norwegian: Forsvarets operasjonsmedalje) is a military medal of Norway. Established 1 April 2005, the medal currently recognises 30 days of service abroad in a designated operational area with the Norwegian Armed Forces. Participation as part of an international military staff is also creditable, so long as the service is in the area of operations.

== Criteria ==
Upon its establishment on 1 April 2005, the Medal for Defence Operations Abroad was awarded for 90 days service in an overseas military operation as designated by the Chief of Defence. After 1 April 2011, personnel are eligible for award of the medal after 30 days of service, instead of the previous 90 days. This change in length of required service had no retroactive effect on eligibility for the Medal for Defence Operations Abroad.

Personnel typically serve with a Norwegian Armed Forces unit to be eligible for this medal. Norwegian personnel who serve on a multinational staff, as part of the operation, are also eligible as long as the service was performed in the area of operations. Personnel who are wounded without completing the specified length of service may be awarded the medal. Foreign personnel who serve with Norwegian units are also eligible for award of the Medal for Defence Operations Abroad.

== Appearance ==
The Medal for Defence Operations Abroad is round made of a bronze colored metal with a matte finish. The obverse of the medal bears the Coat of Arms of Norway superimposed over a sword. On either side of the sword's hilt are the words SEMPER PARATUS (Always prepared). The reverse depicts an 8-point compass rose. This design is used for all versions of the medal, with the suspension and service ribbons varying for service in different countries and operations. Roman numerals are attached to the ribbon to indicate multiple awards of the same medal.

== Ribbons ==
The ribbons of the medal are typically representative of the country where service was performed. The edges of each ribbon are the same, with the colors taken from the Flag of Norway. The colors in the center often come from the colors in the flags of the countries where operations took place. When more than one medal representing service in multiple areas is worn, the medals and ribbons are worn by date of Norway's military involvement in the operation.

| Medal for Defence Operations Abroad - Bosnia-Herzegovina |
| Medal for Defence Operations Abroad - Kosovo-Serbia-Montenegro |
| Medal for Defence Operations Abroad - Afghanistan |
| Medal for Defence Operations Abroad - Operation Active Endeavour |
| Medal for Defence Operations Abroad - Iraq |
| Medal for Defence Operations Abroad - Operation Baltic Accession |
| Medal for Defence Operations Abroad - Sudan |
| Medal for Defence Operations Abroad - Lebanon |
| Medal for Defence Operations Abroad - Chad |
| Medal for Defence Operations Abroad - Somalia |
| Medal for Defence Operations Abroad - Libya |
| Medal for Defence Operations Abroad - Syria |
| Medal for Defence Operations Abroad - Mali |
| Medal for Defence Operation Abroad - Operation Sea Guardian/Mediterranean Sea |
