= Norwegian Police Cross of Honour =

Norwegian civil decoration

Norwegian Police Cross of Honour Politiets hederkors
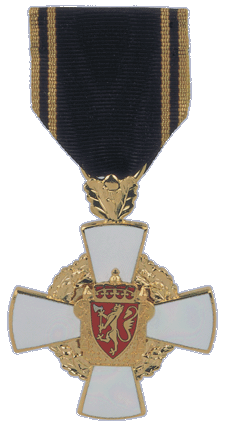
- Norwegian Police Cross of Honour ribbon
- Type: Medal
- Awarded for: Assisting the Norwegian police in a particularly meritorious manner
- Presented by: Norway
- Status: Currently awarded
- Established: 14 September 2001
- Norwegian Police Cross of Honour ribbon

Precedence
- Next (higher): Nansen medal for Outstanding Research
- Equivalent: Civil Defence Cross of Honour; Norwegian Defence Cross of Honour
- Next (lower): Defence Service Medal with Laurel Branch

The Norwegian Police Cross of Honour (Norwegian: Politiets hederskors/Politiets heiderskross) is a medal which is awarded by the head of the National Police Directorate of Norway to Norwegian police personnel for helping to prevent loss of life or damage to equipment and property by act of ingenuity in perilous conditions. After having been discontinued since 2012, it was awarded in 2019 to retired Director of Public Prosecutions Tor-Aksel Busch, and is currently an active award.

== Appearance of the Award ==
- It is a cross of gilded metal suspended from a stylised spray of oak leaves.
- On the obverse the arms of the cross are enamelled white. In the centre is the emblem of the Norwegian Police Service: the Norwegian Coat of Arms (a gold lion on a red field) on a gold background engraved with fasces. This is surrounded by a wreath of oak leaves.
- The reverse, unenamelled, bears the words HONOR ET MERITUM (Honour and Merit) in three lines on a circle at the centre of the cross.
- The ribbon is black with double yellow edges.

== Notable recipients ==
- Gunnar Sønsteby
