= Armed Forces Medal for Heroic Deeds =

Norwegian military decoration for heroism

Forsvarets medalje for edel dåd
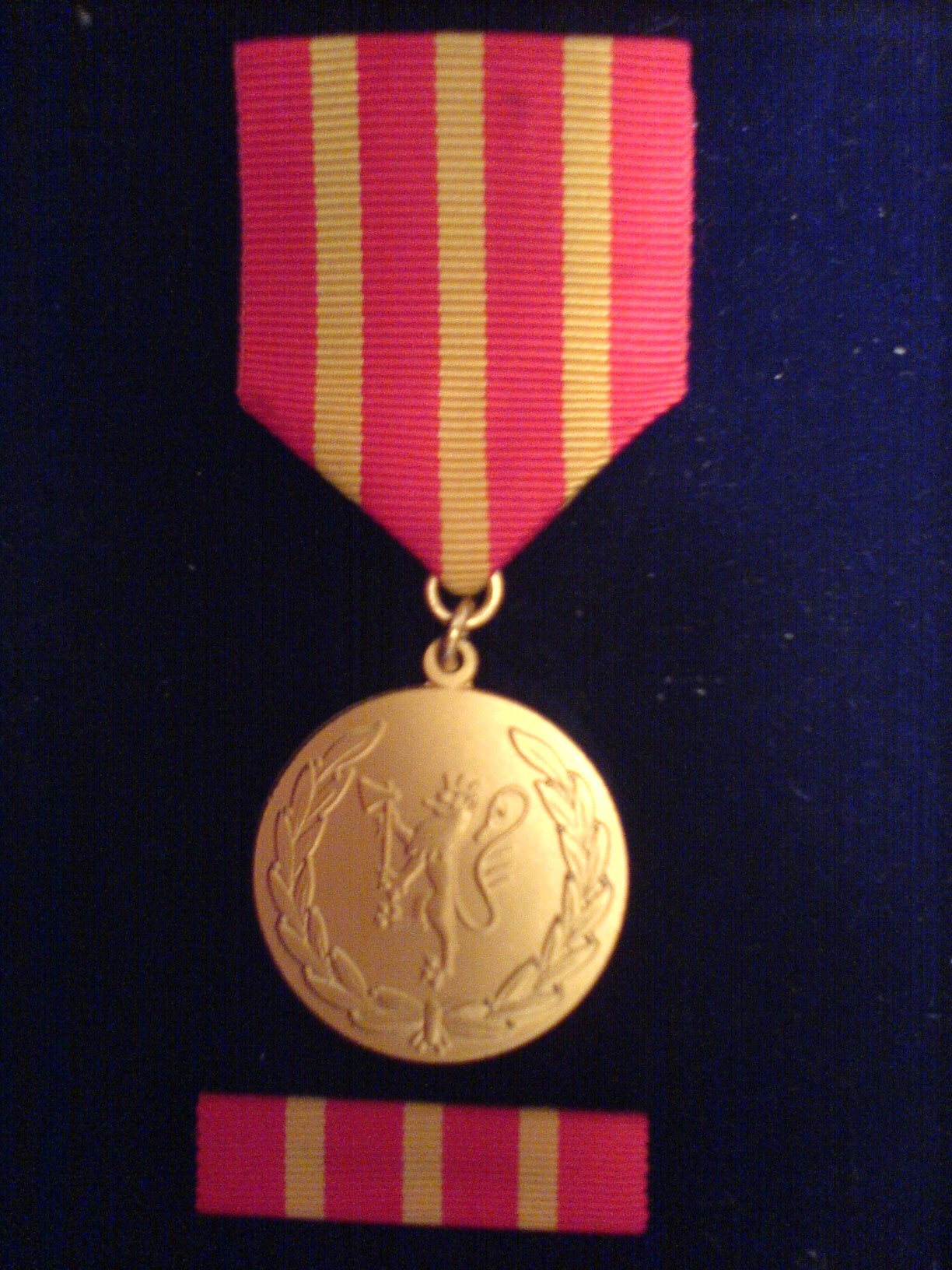
- Type: Single-grade medal
- Awarded for: Heroic deeds done while on active service.
- Presented by: Norway
- Eligibility: Personnel on active service for the Norwegian Defence Force.
- Status: Still awarded
- Established: 1 May 1982
- Armed Forces Medal for Heroic Deeds ribbon

Precedence
- Next (higher): War Medal
- Next (lower): Haakon VIIs Freedom Medal

The Armed Forces Medal for Heroic Deeds (Forsvarets medalje for edel dåd) was instituted in 1982 for heroic deeds done while on active service for the Norwegian Defence Force.

== Description of the Medal ==
- The obverse of the medal features the Norwegian lion.
- The reverse has the inscription "FORSVARET FOR EDEL DÅD" (The Defence For noble deed).
- The ribbon is red with three yellow stripes.

== See also ==
- Orders, decorations, and medals of Norway
