= Medal for Defence Service Abroad =

Medal for Defence Service Abroad Forsvarets Innsatsmedalje
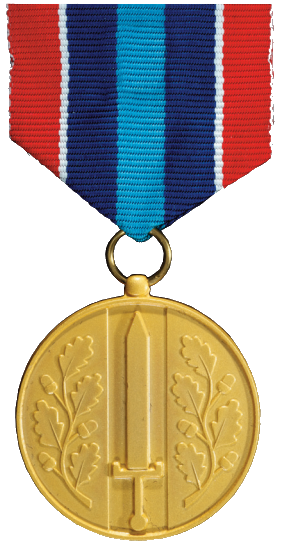
- Medal for Defence Service Abroad, current version
- Type: Achievement medal
- Awarded for: Exemplary bravery during active operations.
- Country: Norway
- Presented by: the Chief of Defence
- Eligibility: Military personnel
- Status: Currently awarded
- Established: 1 January 1993
- Current ribbon of the medal

Precedence
- Next (higher): Civil Defence Medal for International Service
- Next (lower): Medal for Defence Operations Abroad

The Medal for Defence Service Abroad (Norwegian: Forsvarets Innsatsmedalje) is a military medal of Norway. Established 1 January 1993, the medal was originally a participant medal awarded for service during military operations that took place in the 1990s. The subsequent establishment of the Medal for Defence Operations Abroad rendered this medal obsolete. However, in 2009 the medal was reintroduced as an achievement medal . The medal was awarded for distinguished bravery and courage, beyond what is normally required during combat operations. The medal's color was changed from bronze to gold, and the ribbons of the medal would vary, depending on the area of operations. During this period of award the medal was always awarded with a rosette. Finally, in 2012 the medal was further changed to a single ribbon design for all awards. The medal may be awarded with rosette for particularly meritorious distinction.

== Criteria ==
2012

The Medal for Defence Service Abroad is awarded to Norwegian and foreign military personnel for exemplary bravery during active operations, as determined by Norwegian authorities. The medal is awarded by the Norwegian Chief of Defence and may be awarded posthumously. Recipients must have distinguished themselves by bravery and courage beyond what is normally required. The medal is awarded once, however multiple awards may be recognized by the wearing of a bar or rosette. Only three bars or rosettes may worn.

2009

Re-established on 20 May 2009 the Medal for Defence Service Abroad was awarded as an achievement medal . The medal was awarded with rosette to Norwegian and foreign civilian and military personnel who participated in perilous and special military operations abroad.

1993

Awarded as a participant medal, the Medal for Defence Service Abroad was awarded to both Norwegian and foreign civilian and military personnel who served abroad for at least two months on international service. In special cases, the medal was awarded with rosette.

== Appearance ==
The Medal for Defence Service Abroad is round, embossed in gold colored metal. On the obverse is a sword pointing up, with an oak branch on either side. On the reverse are the words FOR DIN INNSATS with oak branches above and below. The medal is suspended from a ribbon in the colours of the Flag of Norway and the Norwegian Armed Forces' colors. The ribbon is blue with red edges, the red edges are bordered in the inside by a thin white stripe. In the center is a stripe of light blue.

== Ribbons ==
Medal for Defence Service Abroad with rosette
Medal for Defence Service Abroad
Medal for Defence Service Abroad - Afghanistan
Medal for Defence Service Abroad - Saudi Arabia (Gulf War)
Medal for Defence Service Abroad - Balkans (UNPROFOR)
