= King's Medal of Merit =

Norwegian merit award

King's Medal of Merit Kongens fortjenstmedalje
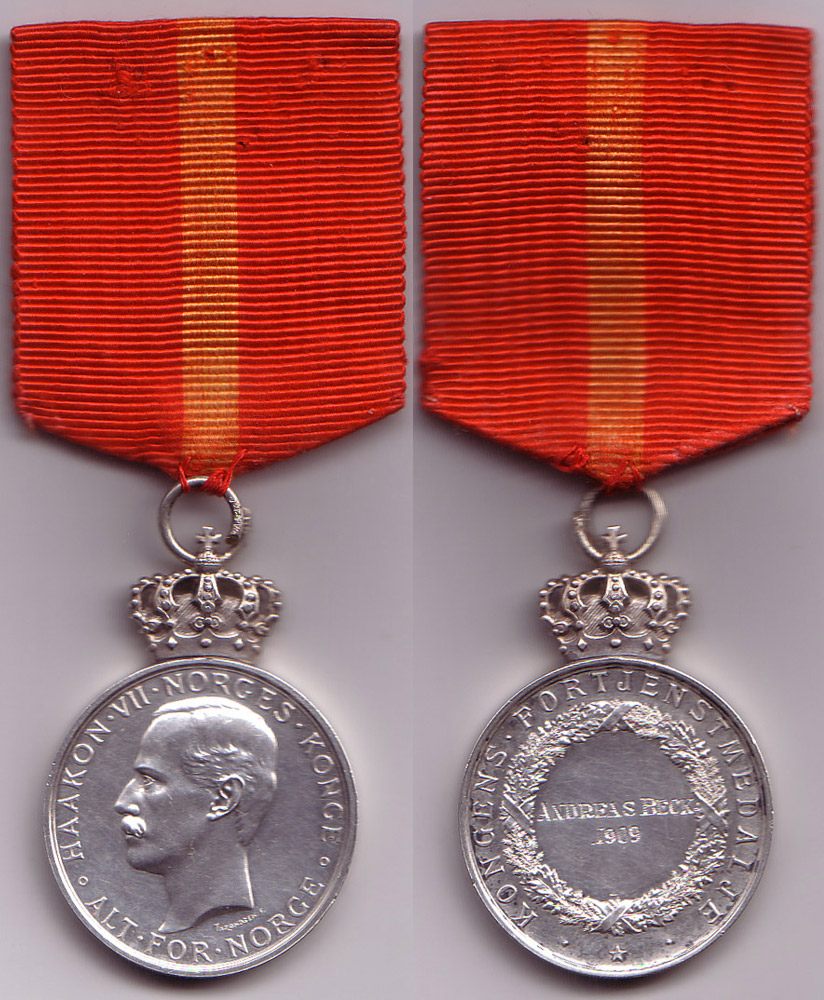
- Silver King's Medal of Merit
- Type: Two class medal (gold and silver)
- Awarded for: Meritorious achievements in art, science, business, and public service
- Presented by: Norway
- Established: 1 February 1908

Highlights
- Total recipients: 35,000 (15% of awards in gold)
- Ribbon bar of the medal

Precedence
- Next (higher): Medal for Heroic Deeds (gold); Civil Defence Service Medal with Laurel Branch (silver)
- Next (lower): St. Olav's Medal (gold); Defence Medal (silver)
- Related: Maudheim medal

The King's Medal of Merit (Norwegian: Kongens fortjenstmedalje) is a Norwegian award. It was instituted in 1908 to reward meritorious achievements in the fields of art, science, business, and public service. It is divided in two classes: gold and silver. The medal in gold is rewarded for extraordinary achievements of importance to the nation and society while the medal in silver may be awarded for lesser achievements. It is suspended from a ribbon in the colours of the Royal Standard of Norway.

The medal in gold is ranked eighth in the ranking of Norwegian orders and medals. The medal in silver is ranked 11th.

== Description ==
- The obverse shows the head of the reigning Monarch with name and motto. As of 2015, there have been three versions: Haakon VII (1908–1957), Olav V (1957–1991), and Harald V (since 1991).
- The reverse bears a wreath and the words KONGENS FORTJENSTMEDALJE (Royal Medal of Merit) with the recipient's name engraved in the middle of the wreath.
- The ribbon is red with a yellow central stripe.

== See also ==
- Orders, decorations, and medals of Norway
