= Norwegian Defence Cross of Honour =

Norwegian medal

Norwegian Defence Cross of Honour Forsvarets hederkors
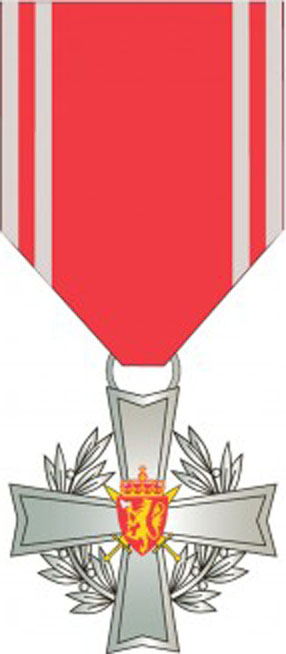
- Type: Medal
- Awarded for: Assisting the Norwegian Defence forces in a particularly meritorious manner
- Presented by: Norway
- Status: May still be awarded
- Established: 30 January 2012
- First award: 24 April 2012

Highlights
- Total: 1
- Norwegian Defence Cross of Honour ribbon

Precedence
- Next (higher): Nansen medal for Outstanding Research
- Equivalent: Civil Defence Cross of Honour; Norwegian Police Cross of Honour
- Next (lower): Defence Service Medal with Laurel Branch

The Norwegian Defence Cross of Honour (Norwegian: Forsvarets hederkors) is a medal which is awarded by the commander of the Norwegian Defence forces to persons having performed Meritious work in or for the Norwegian defence forces.

The Medal was established by royal decree on 30 January 2012, after a proposal of the commander of the Norwegian forces. It ranks as number 18 in the list of Norwegian decorations, though it is equal to the Norwegian Police Cross of Honour and Civil Defence Cross of Honour ranked 16th and 17th by seniority only.

The Norwegian Defence Cross of Honour consists of a cross with slightly splayed out arms, with the Norwegian armed forces herald (Coat of arms of Norway with point up, crossed swords) in the cross-junction; The cross is lain over silver laurels.

== Notable recipients ==
- Gunnar Sønsteby

== See also ==
- Orders, decorations, and medals of Norway
