= Nansen Medal for Outstanding Research =

Norwegian civil award

Nansen Medal for Outstanding Research Nansenmedaljen for fremragende forskning
- Ribbon bar of the medal
- Awarded for: Scientists who have been awarded the Fridtjof Nansen Prize for Outstanding Research
- Presented by: Norway
- Eligibility: Individuals
- Established: 2003

Precedence
- Next (higher): Medal for Rescue at Sea
- Next (lower): Norwegian Police Cross of Honour

The Nansen Medal for Outstanding Research is a Norwegian medal awarded by the Nansen Fund.

The medal is awarded to scientists who have produced research of international significance of a very high level. The medal is awarded to Norwegian scientists or to scientists residing permanently in Norway.

The medal has been awarded to recipients of the Fridtjof Nansen Prize for Outstanding Research since 2003 and was approved as an official Norwegian medal by Royal Resolution on 25 April 2007.

The Nansen Prize has been awarded since 1897 and in a ceremony in 2003 all living prizewinners were awarded the medal. Since 2003 the prize and the medal have been awarded in the same ceremony.

The medal is ranked 15 in the ranking of orders, decorations and medals of Norway.

== Description of the medal ==
- The medal is circular and silver.
- The obverse shows the head of Fridtjof Nansen surrounded by the inscription FRIDTJOF NANSENS BELØNNING FOR FREMRAGENDE FORSKNING (Fridtjof Nansen Award for Outstanding Research).
- The reverse bears the inscription FRIDTJOF NANSENS FOND TIL VIDENSKABENS FREMME (Fridtjof Nansen Fund to Promote Science) in a laurel wreath.
- The ribbon is royal blue with white edge stripes.

== See also ==
- Magnus Aarbakke
- Endre Berner
- Ottar Grønvik
- Victor D. Norman
- Idun Reiten
- Agnar Sandmo
- Nils Andreas Sørensen
- Nils Christian Stenseth

== See also ==
- Orders, decorations, and medals of Norway
