= Defence Service Medal with Laurel Branch =

Norwegian military decoration

Defence Service Medal with Laurel Branch Forsvarsmedaljen med laurbærgren
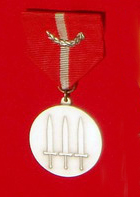
- Defence Service Medal with Laurel Branch
- Type: Medal
- Awarded for: Outstanding or noteworthy service to the Norwegian Armed Forces
- Country: Norway
- Presented by: the Chief of Defence
- Eligibility: Military personnel and civilians
- Status: Currently awarded
- Established: 1 May 1982
- Ribbon of the medal

Precedence
- Next (higher): Norwegian Defence Cross of Honour
- Next (lower): Police Service Medal with Laurel Branch

The Defence Service Medal with Laurel Branch (Norwegian: Forsvarsmedaljen med laurbærgren Nynorsk: Forsvarsmedaljen med laurbærgrein) is a military medal of Norway. Established on 1 May 1982, the medal is awarded for outstanding or noteworthy service to the Norwegian Armed Forces. It may be awarded to Norwegians and foreigners who are civilians or military personnel.

== Appearance ==
The Defense Service Medal with Laurel Branch is a round embossed medal made of silver metal. The obverse bears the depiction of three swords placed side by side with the blades pointing upwards. The reverse bears the inscription FORSVARET – FOR FORTJENESTER (ARMED FORCES – FOR MERIT) The medal is suspended from a red ribbon with a central vertical stripe of silver. A laurel branch device is attached to the suspension ribbon of the medal, and the service ribbon worn in undress.
