= List of Norwegian flags =

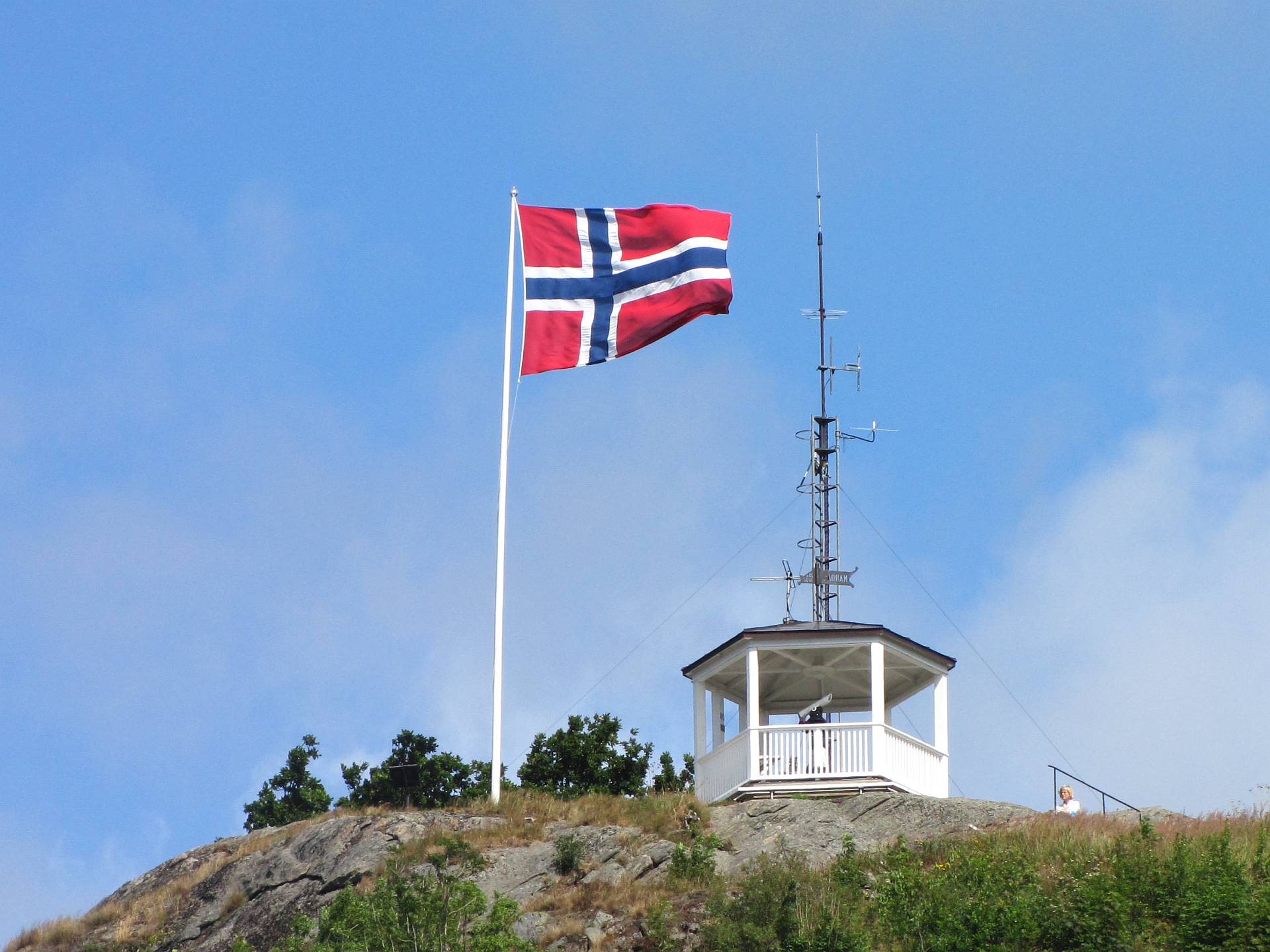
The Flag of Norway hoisted in Mandal.

The following is a list of flags of entities named or related to Norway.

== Kingdom of Norway ==
=== National flags ===
Flag	Duration	Use	Description
	13 July 1821 – present	Flag of Norway	A red field with a blue Nordic cross and white fimbriation. Fredrik Meltzer, a member of parliament (Storting) designed the national flag in 1821.

=== Civil pennant ===
Flag	Duration	Use	Description
	– present	Household pennant of Norway.	

=== Royal standards ===
Flag	Duration	Use	Description
	15 November 1905 – present	Royal Standard of Norway	The coat of arms of Norway in banner form featuring a golden lion on a red field.
	26 September 1924 – present	Standard of the Crown Prince of Norway, may also be used by the Crown Princess.	Royal standard with a swallowtail.
	– present	Royal pennant	Royal standard in pennant form.

=== Flags of the government ===
Flag	Duration	Use	Description
	1899 – present	State flag of Norway	Flag of Norway with swallowtail and tongue. Used on government buildings like the Storting building.
	1937 – present	Flag of the Minister of Defence	State flag with a white lion from coat of arms in canton.
	1905–1937	Flag of the Minister of Defence	

=== Other flags ===
Flag	Duration	Use	Description
	1905 – present	The postal flag of Norway	
	1905–2000	The Harbor Police flag of Norway	
	– present	Flag of the Royal Norwegian Yacht Club	
	1941–1958	House flag of Nortraship.	This flag was flown ashore from Nortraship offices, ships flew the regular Norwegian merchant flag.
	– present	Flag of the NRK (Norwegian Broadcasting Corporation)	Light blue field with the NRK logo in white.
	1990 – present	Flag of the Church of Norway	
		Flag of the Norwegian Society for Sea Rescue	

== Flags of the military ==
Flag	Duration	Use	Description
	15 November 1905 – present	Naval ensign and war flag	Same as the state flag.
	– present	Flag of the Chief of Defence	State flag with a golden lion from coat of arms in canton.

=== Flags of the Navy ===
Flag	Duration	Use	Description
	– present	Naval jack	Norwegian flag in 1:1 proportions.
	2010–present	Flag of the Chief of the Navy	Known as Inspector General until 2017.
	– present	Rank flag of admirals	Naval ensign with four white stars in canton.
	– present	Rank flag of vice admirals	Naval ensign with three white stars in canton.
	– present	Rank flag of rear admirals	Naval ensign with two white star in canton.
	– present	Rank flag of commodores	Naval ensign with one white star in canton.
	– present	Rank flag of captains	Swallowtail with Norwegian stripe.
	– present	Rank flag of a Norwegian squadron commander or senior officer	Pennant with Norwegian stripe.
	– present	Rank flag of petty officers	Red pennant.
	– present	Royal Norwegian Navy pennant. A commissioning pennant and used as a rank flag by those officers not possessing a separate rank flag.	Norwegian swallowtailed pennant.
	1905–2010	Former flag of the Inspector General of the Navy	
	– present	Flag used on land (Feltflagg)	Flown at Naval bases but not at sea.

=== Flags of the Army ===
The rank flags are also used by the Air Force and Home Guard.

Flag	Duration	Use	Description
	– present	Flag of the Norwegian Army	Red field with the emblem of the Army in the center.
	1905–present	Flag of the Chief of the Army	Known as Inspector General until 2017.
	1982–present	Rank flag of generals	War flag with four golden stars in canton. The general officers flag had three stars from 1905 to 1982.
	1982–present	Rank flag of lieutenant generals	War flag with three golden stars in canton. The lieutenant generals flag had two stars from 1905 to 1982.
	1982–present	Rank flag of major generals	War flag with two golden stars in canton. The major generals flag had one star from 1905 to 1982.
	1982–present	Rank flag of brigadiers	War flag with one golden star in canton.
	1901–1905	Former flag of the Inspector General	

=== Flags of the Air Force ===
The Air Force uses the same rank flags as the Army.

Flag	Duration	Use	Description
	– present	Flag of the Royal Norwegian Air Force	Light blue field with the logo of the Air Force in the canton and the roundel of Norway.
	2010–present	Flag of the Chief of the Air Force	War flag with golden winged coat of arms in canton. Known as Inspector General until 2017.
	– 2010	Former flag of the Inspector General of the Air Force	

=== Flags of the Home Guard ===
Flag	Duration	Use	Description
	– present	Flag of the Home Guard	Used on Home Guard bases.
	– present	Flag of the Chief of the Home Guard	Known as Inspector General until 2017.

=== Flags of the Coastal Artillery ===
The now obsolete Coastal artillery of Norway used to have separate rank flags.

Flag	Duration	Use	Description
	1919–2002	Flag of the Inspector General	
	1919–2002	Flag of the brigadier	
	1919–2002	Flag of the commodore	
	1919–2002	Flag of the commander senior grade	
	1919–2002	Flag of the commander	
	1919–2002	Flag of the captain	
	1919–2002	Pennant of subordinate officers	

=== Other flags ===
Flag	Duration	Use	Description
	– present	Flag of the Telemark Battalion	
	– present	Flag of the Vardøhus Fortress	
	– present	Flag of the Norwegian Cyber Defence Force	
	– present	Flag of the Norwegian Artillery Battalion	

=== Military colours ===
In Norwegian military vexillology, a distinction is made between colours (Norwegian: faner), standards (Norwegian: standarter), and ceremonial flags (Norwegian: seremoniflagg), although these are often collectively referred to as colours. Colours are the traditional banners of military units, historically borne in battle as symbols of unity and morale, and as markers of a unit’s affiliation and identity. In the mounted arms, the corresponding term for this type of flag is standard. Standards are typically smaller than colours and are usually distinguished by a swallowtailed design. The units of the Norwegian Army and the Norwegian Home Guard still bear the Norwegian lion in their colours, the old royal emblem. The Royal Norwegian Navy does not carry colours, but instead uses the naval ensign (Norwegian: orlogsflagget), also referred to as the naval colour (Norwegian: orlogsfane). The Royal Norwegian Air Force has chosen to use its own unit insignia as the motif on the cloth. Colours and standards are produced in only a single example and are treated with great respect. Other military government agencies and similar bodies that wish to mark their presence or express their identity at various kinds of events may instead use a ceremonial flag. A ceremonial flag is designed as a heraldic flag and has a character similar to that of a colour, but is not itself a colour. Unlike colours, ceremonial flags may be produced in multiple copies. The branches of the Norwegian Armed Forces, the Norwegian Defence Staff, and other agencies within the defence sector all have ceremonial flags designed in the form of colours.

Ceremonial flag of the Norwegian Defence Staff

Colour of the Special Operations Command

Ceremonial colour of the Norwegian Reservists Association

==== Army colours ====
Ceremonial flag of the Norwegian Army

Colour of Hans Majestet Kongens Garde

Colour of the Norwegian Military Academy

Colour of Brigade Nord

Standard of the Armoured Battalion

Colour of the Telemark Battalion

Colour of the Narvik Battalion

Colour of the Artillery Battalion

Colour of the Combat Engineer Battalion

Colour of the Signal Battalion

Colour of the Medical Battalion

Colour of the Combat Service Support Battalion

Colour of the Military Police Company

Colour of Finnmark Land Command

Colour of the Porsanger Battalion

Colour of the Ranger Battalion GSV

Standard of the Nordenfjeldske Intelligence Regiment

Colour of the Army Logistic Regiment

Colour of the Weapons Technical Regiment

Colour of the Military Police Department

Colour of the Land Warfare Centre

Colour of the Competence Centre for Logistics and Operational Support

==== Historical army colours ====
Colour of Hans Majestet Kongens Garde (Olav V)

Colour of the Norwegian Military Academy (Olav V)

Colour of the 6th Division

Colour of Brigade Sør

Colour of the 5th Brigade

Colour of the 6th Brigade

Colour of the 12th Brigade

Colour of the 15th Brigade

Colour of the Oppland Regiment

Colour of the Finnmark Regiment

Standard of the Søndenfjeldske Dragoon Regiment

Colour of the Artillery Regiment

Colour of the Engineer Regiment

Colour of the Signal Regiment

Colour of the Medical Regiment

Colour of the Logistic Regiment

Colour of the Command School

Colour of Hans Majestet Kongens Garde (Haakon VII)

Colour of the Norwegian Military Academy (Haakon VII)

Colour of Østfold Infantry Regiment No.1

Colour of Vestre-Akershus Infantry Regiment No.2 (Merged into Jegerkorpset)

Colour of Jegerkorpset Infantry Regiment No.2

Colour of Telemark Infantry Regiment No.3

Colour of Akershus Infantry Regiment No.4

Colour of Østoppland Infantry Regiment No.5

Colour of Vestoppland Infantry Regiment No.6

Colour of Agder Infantry Regiment No.7

Colour of Rogaland Infantry Regiment No.8

Colour of Hordaland Infantry Regiment No.9

Colour of Fjordane Infantry Regiment No.10

Colour of Møre Infantry Regiment No.11

Colour of Sør-Trøndelag Infantry Regiment No.12

Colour of Nord-Trøndelag Infantry Regiment No.13

Colour of Sør-Hålogaland Infantry Regiment No.14

Colour of Nord-Hålogaland Infantry Regiment No.15

Colour of Troms Infantry Regiment No.16

Colour of the Alta Battalion

Colour of the Varanger Battalion

Standard of the Akershus Dragoon Regiment

Standard of the Oppland Dragoon Regiment

Standard of the Nordenfjelske Dragoon Regiment

==== Air force colours ====
Ceremonial flag of the Royal Norwegian Air Force

Colour of the Air Force Academy

Colour of the Air Force Academy (1961–2010)

Colour of the Flight School

Colour of the Control and Notification School

Colour of the School Centre

==== Home guard colours ====
Ceremonial flag of the Norwegian Home Guard

Colour of the Oslofjord Home Guard District 01

Colour of the Oslo and Akershus Home Guard District 02

Colour of the Telemark and Buskerud Home Guard District 03

Colour of the Opplandske Home Guard District 05

Colour of the Agder Home Guard District 07 (disbanded)

Colour of the Agder and Rogaland Home Guard District 08

Colour of the Bergenhus Home Guard District 09

Colour of the Møre and Fjordane Home Guard District 11

Colour of the Trøndelag Home Guard District 12

Colour of the Sør-Hålogaland Home Guard District 14

Colour of the Nord-Hålogaland Home Guard District 16

Colour of the Finmark Home Guard District 17

Colour of the Øst-Finmark Home Guard District 18 (disbanded)

Standard of the Rapid Deployment Squadron

=== Army guidons ===
Guidon of the 1st Guard Company

Guidon of the 2nd Guard Company

Guidon of the 3rd Guard Company

Guidon of the 4th Guard Company

Guidon of the 5th Guard Company

Guidon of the 6th Guard Company (disbanded)

Guidon of the 7th Guard Company (disbanded)

Guidon of the 8th Guard Company (disbanded)

== Historical flags ==
These flags are no longer in use, except the merchant flag of 1821–1844, which was also used from 1899 until the present. Note: The Royal Standard of Norway is seen as the official flag of the Old Kingdom of Norway.

=== Raven Banner (9th – 11th century) ===
Flag	Duration	Use	Description
	9th – 11th century	Raven banner	War flag flown by several Viking chieftains and warlords in Scandinavia.

=== Kingdom of Norway (872–1397) ===
Flag	Duration	Use	Description
	13th century	Likely royal banner of Norway	The flags of Norway, Denmark, and Sweden, as depicted in Ernst von Kirchberg's Mecklenburgske Rimkrønike from the 1370s. Banner of arms with golden lion on red canvas. Regarded as the predecessor to the current Royal Standard of Norway.

=== Kalmar Union (1397–1537) ===
Flag	Duration	Use	Description
	1397–1523	The "banner of the realms", flag of the Kalmar Union.	The flag of the Kalmar Union was used in the triple union led by Denmark, which included Norway and Sweden. In a letter written by Eric of Pomerania dated from 1430, the "banner of the realms" is described as "a red cross in a yellow field".
	1427	Maritime flag	A flag captured from a Danish ship by Lübeck forces in 1427 showed the arms of Denmark, Sweden, Norway, and Pomerania. The original flag was destroyed in World War II during an Allied bombing raid on Lübeck, but a 19th-century copy remains in Frederiksborg Palace, Denmark.

=== Denmark–Norway (1537–1814) ===
Flag	Duration	Use	Description
	1537–1814	Dannebrogen, flag of Denmark–Norway.	From 1748 the only approved merchant flag.
	1731–1814	Royal standard of Denmark–Norway.	
	1696–1814	State flag and naval ensign of Denmark–Norway.	
	1757–1814	Denmark–Norway merchant flag used on distant waters.	Used south of Cape Finisterre. Flag was made to distinguish Danish–Norwegian ships from those of the Maltese Order.
	1796–1848	The canton flag of Denmark–Norway.	Used by Danish and Norwegian ships sailing to the Danish West Indies.
	1600s	Norwegian Royal standard used by some ships	Danish–Norwegian ship with royal flag in 1644 painting.

=== Kingdom of Norway (1814) ===
Flag	Duration	Use	Description
	1814–1821	Flag of Norway	Unofficial alternative merchant flag used by some shippers to distinguish it from the flag of Denmark. Based on the Dannebrog but with the lion from the Norwegian coat of arms in the canton. Merchant flag of Norway (1814–1821) during Sweden–Norway. On ships only north of Cape Finisterre, Spain. On longer distances the Swedish flag was used.
	1814	State and naval ensign of Norway	
	1814	Naval pennant of Norway	

=== Sweden-Norway (1814–1905) ===
Flag	Duration	Use	Description
	1815–1821	Flag of Sweden, the alternative merchant flag of Norway	Used on ships south of Cape Finisterre, Spain.
	1818–1838; 1838–1844 (optional)	Flag used by Norwegian ships south of Cape Finisterre, Spain.	From 1821 it was also used by Swedish ships there.
	1815–1844	State flag, war flag, and naval ensign of Norway and Sweden	
	1815–1844	Royal standard of Norway and Sweden	
	1844–1905	Union mark of Norway	Commonly informally referred to as the "herring salad". Removed from Norwegian merchant and state flags in 1899.
	1844–1905	Naval jack and diplomatic flag of Norway and Sweden	Also used as union mark in Swedish flags until 1 November 1905.
	1844–1898	Merchant flag of Norway	The union mark was removed from the state flag after 1898.
	1844–1905	War flag and naval ensign of Norway	
	1844–1905	Royal standard of Norway	

=== Other flags of Sweden-Norway (1815–1844) ===
Flag	Duration	Use	Description
	1815–1824	Customs flag of Norway and Sweden	
	1824–1842	Customs flag of Norway and Sweden	
	1836–1844	Rear admiral rank flag of Norway and Sweden	
	1836–1844	Vice admiral rank flag of Norway and Sweden	
	1836–1844	Admiral rank flag of Norway and Sweden	
	1815–1844	Commander of a squadron rank flag of Norway and Sweden	
	1815–1844	Commodore rank flag of Norway and Sweden	
	1815–1844	Commissioning pennant of Norway and Sweden	

=== Other flags of Sweden-Norway (1844–1905) ===
Flag	Duration	Use	Description
Image Missing	1844–1899	Customs flag of Norway	Norwegian state flag with union jack in canton and customs emblem on cross.
	1844–1854	Commanding admiral rank flag of Royal Norwegian Navy (separate from Royal Swedish Navy).	
	1875–1905	Vice admiral rank flag of Royal Norwegian Navy (separate from Royal Swedish Navy).	The state flag/naval ensign was used as rank flag between 1858 and 1875.
	1844–1854	Command (all admirals) rank flag of Royal Norwegian Navy (separate from Royal Swedish Navy).	
	1875–1905	Admiral rank flag of Royal Norwegian Navy (separate from Royal Swedish Navy).	The state flag/naval ensign was used as rank flag between 1858 and 1875.
	1875–1905	Vice admiral rank flag of Royal Norwegian Navy (separate from Royal Swedish Navy).	The state flag/naval ensign was used as rank flag between 1858 and 1875.
	1875–1905	Rear admiral rank flag of Royal Norwegian Navy (separate from Royal Swedish Navy).	The state flag/naval ensign was used as rank flag between 1858 and 1875.
	1844–1858	Commodore rank flag of Royal Norwegian Navy (separate from Royal Swedish Navy).	
	1858–1875	Commodore rank flag of Royal Norwegian Navy (separate from Royal Swedish Navy).	
	1844–1858	Detachment commander rank flag of Royal Norwegian Navy (separate from Royal Swedish Navy).	
	1858–1875	Detachment commander rank flag of Royal Norwegian Navy (separate from Royal Swedish Navy).	
	1875–1905	Detachment commander rank flag of Royal Norwegian Navy (separate from Royal Swedish Navy).	
	1844–1858	Commissioning pennant of Royal Norwegian Navy (separate from Royal Swedish Navy).	
	1901–1905	Flag of the Minister of Defence of Norway (separate from the Swedish Naval Ministry)	
	1875–1905	Flag of Harbor Police of Norway	

=== German occupation of Norway ===
Flag	Duration	Use	Description
	24 April 1940 – 8 May 1945	Flag of the Reichskommissariat Norwegen	Same as the flag of Germany (1935–1945).
	5 February 1942 – 8 May 1945	Possible alternative state flag or minister flag of the Quisling regime	State flag without the NS eagle insignia was more commonly flown. It was used as a car flag during the first parliament meeting in 1942.

== Nasjonal Samling and collaborationists ==
=== Party Flags ===
Flag	Duration	Use	Description
	1933 – 8 May 1945	Party flag of Nasjonal Samling.	Golden Nordic cross on red field. The flag of Nasjonal Samling was used by the party Nasjonal Samling between 1933 and 1945 and by the collaborationist Quisling regime from 1942 to 1945. Flags of NS were called Solkorsbanneret ("The sun cross banner"), the colors were based on the color scheme of the coat of arms of Norway. The party describes the sun cross as the symbol of the sun, which was carved into stone for several millenniums as a sign of the victory of light over darkness and the Nordic people's struggle for survival. The red field on the cross represents Nordic blood. The flag is almost identical to the Flag of Scania and the Flag of the Swedish-speaking Finns.
	1930s – 8 May 1945	Nasjonal Samling party flag pennant	Used as a small car flag.
	1930s – 8 May 1945	Ordinary NS pennant, design 1	Sun cross in gold on red canvas. Was used as car flag. It is also described as having the same conditions as Hirden's Sveit flags.
	1930s – 8 May 1945	Ordinary NS pennant, design 2	Was used as car flag. Could also be used by any NS organisation.

=== Rikshirden (Hird of the realm) ===
Flag	Duration	Use	Description
	1930s – 8 May 1945	Rikshirden's fylking flag (Raven Banner)	Black raven on yellow canvas. Raven banners were used by Rikshirden and Unghirden as "Fylkingsflagg". "Fylking" means a group of people with a shared goal, either politically or militarily. The word is derived from a shield wall. The NS party was heavily nationalistic and were inspired by symbols from the Viking Age, this included the raven banner which had been used by several Viking chieftains in Scandinavia.
	1930s – 8 May 1945	Rikshirden's Sveit flag (Sveitflagget)	Sun Cross with swords in gold and red on black canvas which represents the black soil of Norway. The swords in the sun cross represent that the Hird is a militaristic organisation. The word "Sveit" is from Old Norse, meaning a team, gathering or herd of troops or Hirdmen. The flags of NS organisations sometimes contained text showing their division and location. The flags of Rikshirden used letters written in gold.
	1930s – 8 May 1945	Rikshirden's Troop flag (Troppsflagget)	
	1930s – 8 May 1945	Rikshirden's Team flag (Lagsflagget)	
	1930s – 8 May 1945	Rikshirden's Staff banner (Stabsbanner)	
	1942–1945	Førergarde's standard	The standard of Vidkun Quisling's personal guard was modelled after the standards of His Majesty the King's Guard, with the king's Royal cypher replaced by the Førergarde's insignia featuring a monogram of Quisling's initials.

=== Unghirden (Youth Hird) ===
Unghirden was a branch of the youth organisation specialized for boys between 14 and 18. The flags of Unghirden was also used by the Guttehirden (Boys hird).

Flag	Duration	Use	Description
	1930s – 8 May 1945	Unghirden's fylking flag (Raven Banner)	Black raven on green canvas.
	1930s – 8 May 1945	Unghirden's Sveit flag (Sveitflagget)	Sun cross with swords in gold and red on green canvas. The flags of Unghirden officially used letters written in silver, yet some flags used gold lettering.
	1930s – 8 May 1945	Unghirden's Troop flag (Troppsflagget)	
	1930s – 8 May 1945	Unghirden's Team flag (Lagsflagget)	

=== NS Ungdomsfylking (Youth organisation) ===
NS Ungdomsfylking was Nasjonal Samling's youth organisation for children and youth from 10 and 18. The flags of Ungdomsfylking was also used by the Gjentehirden (Girls hird) and the Småhirden (Small hird).

Flag	Duration	Use	Description
	1930s – 8 May 1945	Ungdomsfylking's Sveit flag (Sveitflagget)	Sun cross in gold and red on green canvas. The flags of Ungdomsfylking used letters written in silver.
	1930s – 8 May 1945	Ungdomsfylking's Troop flag (Troppsflagget)	
	1930s – 8 May 1945	Ungdomsfylking's Team flag (Lagsflagget)	

=== Kvinnehirden (Women's hird) ===
Kvinnehirden was a branch of the NS Kvinneorganisajonen. Despite being named a Hird, they were not officially part of the hird and did not serve any military function, therefore their flags lacked the swords in the sun cross.

Flag	Duration	Use	Description
	1934 – 8 May 1945	Kvinnehirden's Sveit flag (Sveitflagget)	Sun cross in gold and red on yellowish-white canvas.
	1934 – 8 May 1945	Kvinnehirden's Troop flag (Troppsflagget)	
	1934 – 8 May 1945	Kvinnehirden's Team flag (Lagsflagget)	

=== Kvinneorganisasjon (Women's organisation) ===
NS Kvinneorganisasjonen was an organisation for women connected to the party.

Flag	Duration	Use	Description
	1934 – 8 May 1945	Kvinneorganisasjon's Fylkes flag (Fylkesflagget)	Sun cross in gold and red on sky blue canvas.
	1934 – 8 May 1945	Kvinneorganisasjon's Krets flag (Kretsflagget)	"Krets" is a Norwegian word for a circle of people.
	1934 – 8 May 1945	Kvinneorganisasjon's Team flag (Lagsflagget)	

=== Hirdmarinen (Hird Navy) ===
Hirdmarinen was the Hirden's naval branch meant to form the basis for the future Norwegian navy under Quisling's rule.

Flag	Duration	Use	Description
	1942 – 8 May 1945	Hirdmarinen's ensign	Norwegian ensign with Hirdmarinen's insginia inside blue on the cross.
	1942 – 8 May 1945	Hirdmarinen's naval jack	Hirdmarinen insignia on a blue square field.
	1942 – 8 May 1945	Hirdmarinen's command leader rank flag	Hirdmarinen insignia on a blue field.
	1942 – 8 May 1945	Hirdmarinen's district leader rank flag	Hirdmarinen insignia and four pointed star in canton on a blue field.
	1942 – 8 May 1945	Hirdmarinen's regional leader rank flag	Hirdmarinen insignia on a blue triangular swallowtail.
	1942 – 8 May 1945	Hirdmarinen's sveit leader rank flag	Hirdmarinen insignia on a blue pennant.
	1942 – 8 May 1945	Hirdmarinen's masthead pennant	Hirdmarinen insignia on a blue swallowtailed pennant.
	1942 – 8 May 1945	Hirdmarinen's senior officer rank flag	Anchor on a blue pennant.
	1942 – 8 May 1945	Hirdmarinen's troop and team flag	Hirdmarinen insignia on a blue triangular pennant.

=== Hirdens Flykorps (Hirden Air Force Corps) ===
Flag	Duration	Use	Description
	1942 – 8 May 1945	Flag of the Hirdens Flykorps	

=== Nasjonal Samling Labour Service ===
The NS Labour Service (NS Arbeidstjeneste) was one of the Nasjonal Samling party's special organisations. The Labour Service was meant to combat unemployment in Norway, similar to the German Reich Labour Service.

Flag	Duration	Use	Description
	Summer 1940 – September 1940	Administrative Councils Labour Service flag	The Labour Service in Norway during the occupation was started as a voluntary service by the Administrative Council in the summer of 1940.
	September 1940 – 8 May 1945	NS Arbeidstjeneste flag	The Labour Service was renamed and taken over by Nasjonal Samling in September 1940 and later made compulsory for young men in 1941.
	September 1940 – 8 May 1945	NS Arbeidstjeneste pennants	
	1940 – 8 May 1945	NS Kvinnelig Arbeidstjeneste flag	The women's Labour Service was branch of NS-AT for females.

=== Flags of other Norwegian collaborationists ===
Flag	Duration	Use	Description
	1942 – 8 May 1945	Flag of Germanic SS Norway	Same flag as the Schutzstaffel.
	29 June 1941 – March 1943	Standard of the Norwegian Legion	Norwegian flag with "The Norwegian Legion" written in Norwegian.
	1942 – 8 May 1945	Standard of the Viken Battalion of the Norwegian Legion.	
	29 June 1941 – March 1943	Standard of the Police Company of the Norwegian Legion.	

== Subnational flags ==
Most of the Norwegian counties and municipalities have their own flag. They are based on the respective coat of arms of the subdivision. However they are seldom used. Most public buildings and private homes use the National flag.

== Flags of Norwegian counties ==
Flag of Agder

Flag of Akershus

Flag of Buskerud

Flag of Finnmark

Flag of Innlandet

Flag of Møre og Romsdal

Flag of Nordland

Flag of Oslo

Flag of Rogaland

Flag of Telemark

Flag of Troms

Flag of Trøndelag

Flag of Vestfold

Flag of Vestland

Flag of Østfold

=== Flags of former Norwegian counties ===
Flag of Aust-Agder

Flag of Hedmark

Flag of Hordaland

Flag of Nord-Trøndelag

Flag of Oppland

Flag of Sogn og Fjordane

Flag of Sør-Trøndelag

Flag of Troms og Finnmark

Flag of Vest-Agder

Flag of Vestfold og Telemark

Coat of Arms of Viken

== Flags of Norwegian municipalities ==
This is just a number of municipalities with their own flags, there are however many more municipalities that do use a flag.

=== Agder ===
Flags of municipalities in Agder county.

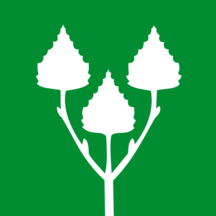
Flag of Birkenes Municipality

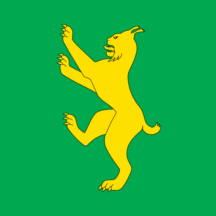
Flag of Bygland Municipality

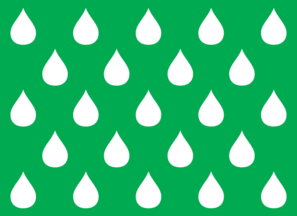
Flag of Bykle Municipality

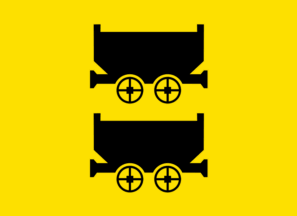
Flag of Evje og Hornnes Municipality

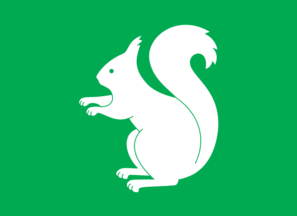
Flag of Froland Municipality

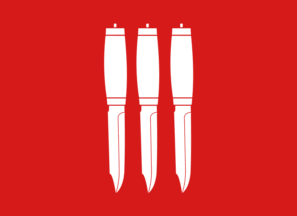
Flag of Gjerstad Municipality

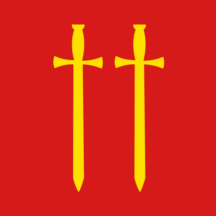
Flag of Hægebostad Municipality

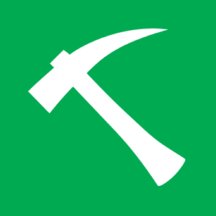
Flag of Iveland Municipality

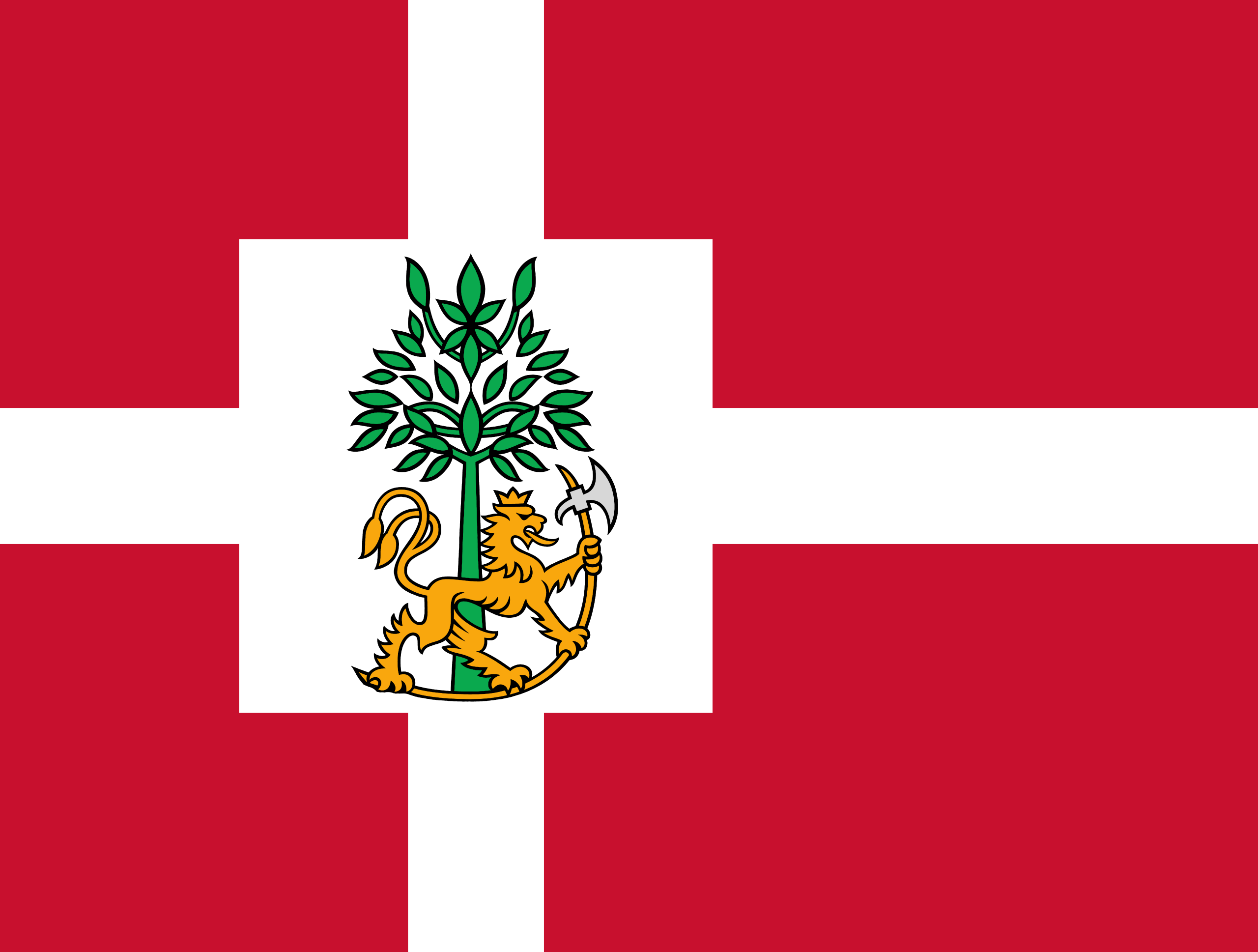
Historic flag of Kristiansand (town) (1600s–)

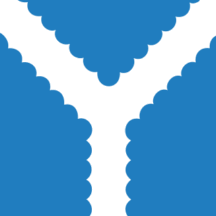
Flag of Kvinesdal Municipality

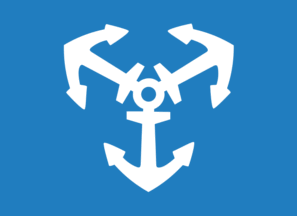
Flag of Lillesand Municipality

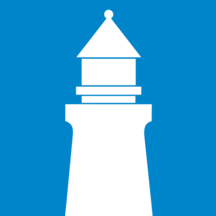
Flag of Lindesnes Municipality

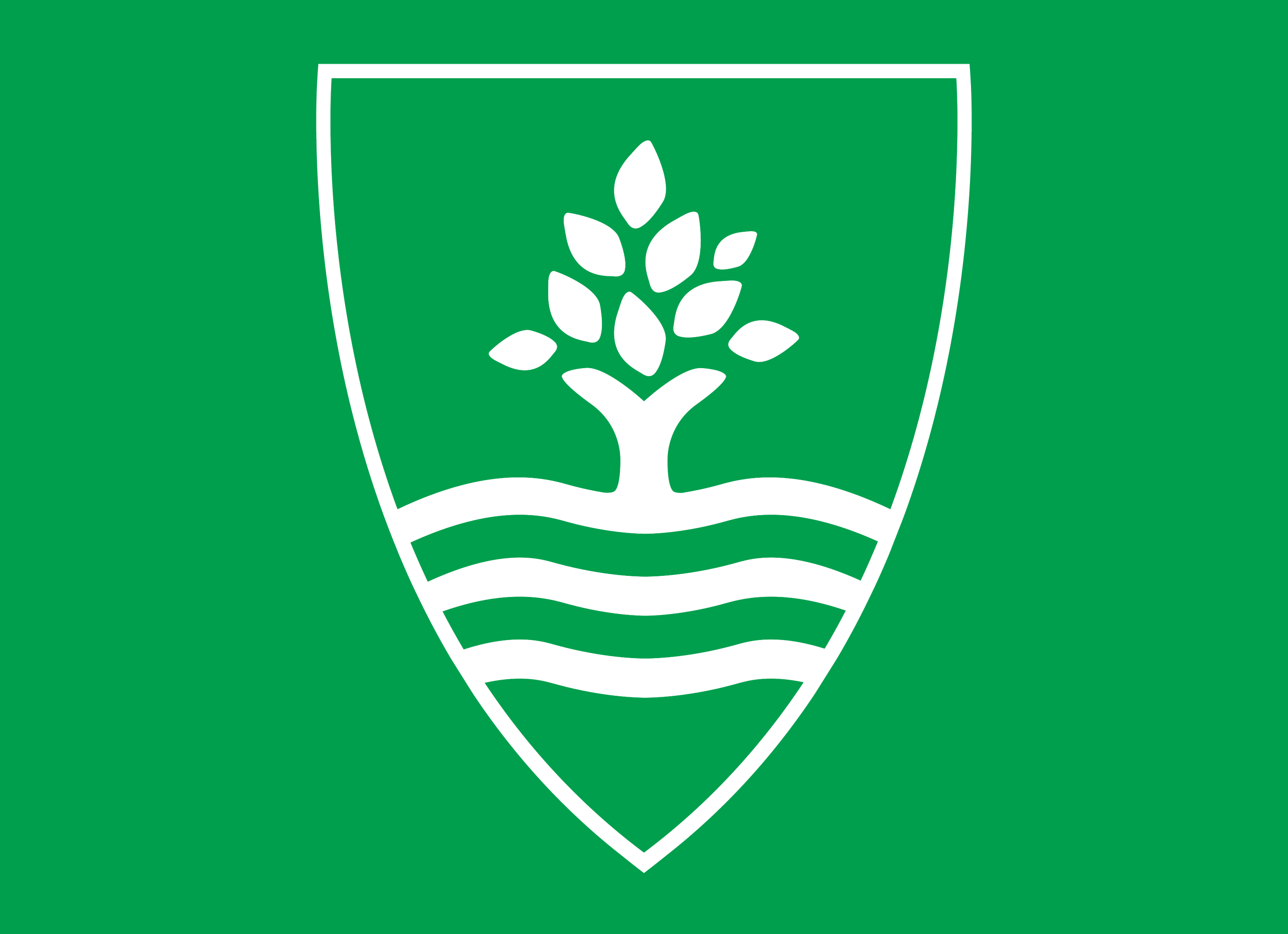
Flag of Lyngdal Municipality

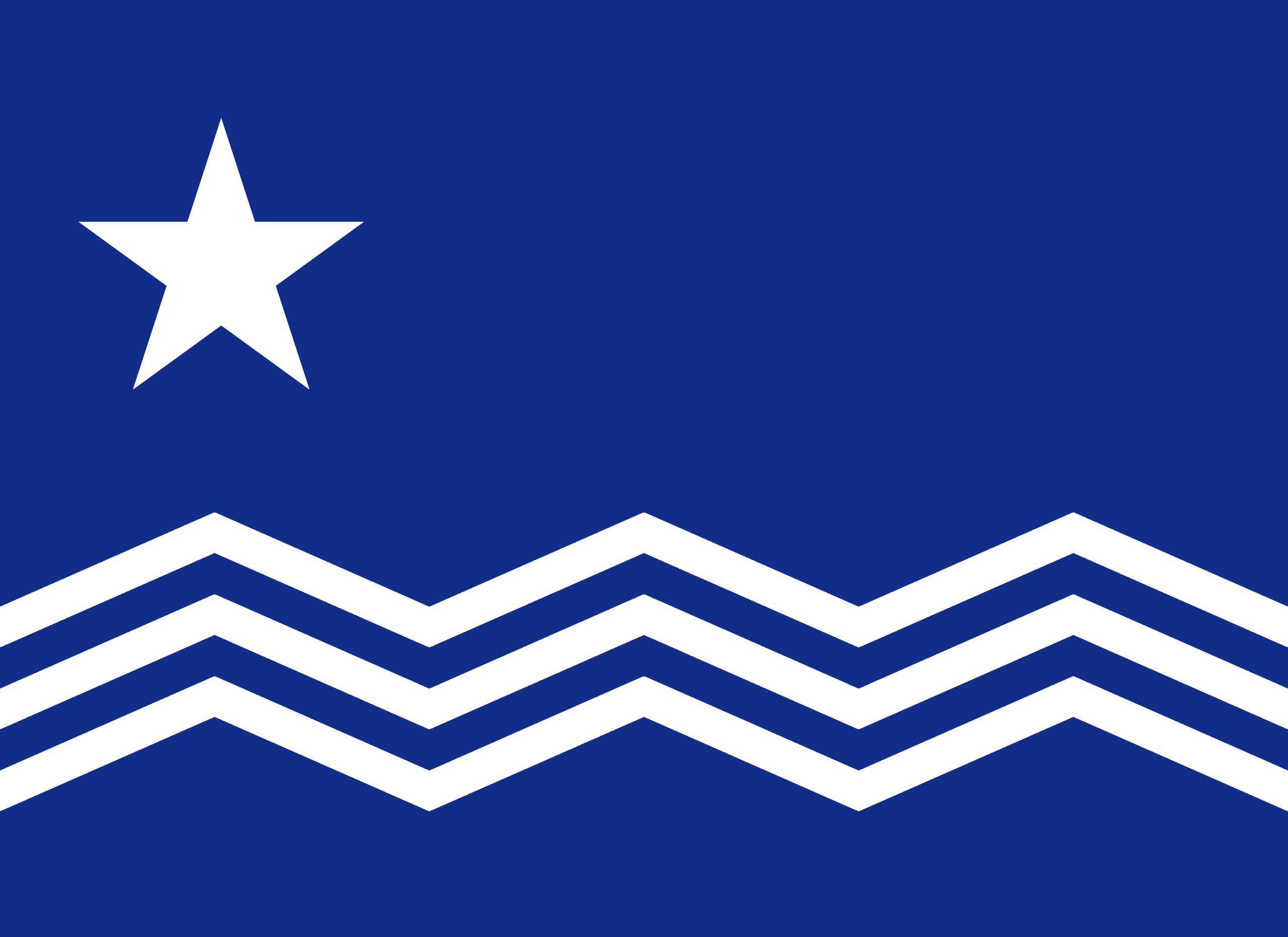
Flag of Risør Municipality

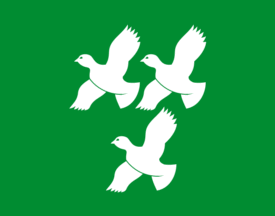
Flag of Sirdal Municipality

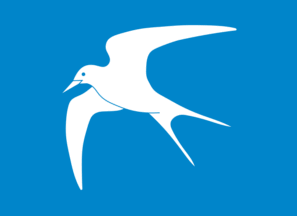
Flag of Tvedestrand Municipality

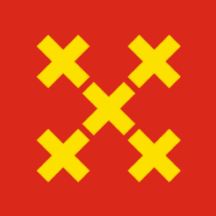
Flag of Valle Municipality

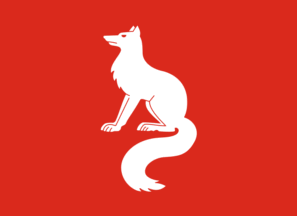
Flag of Vegårshei Municipality

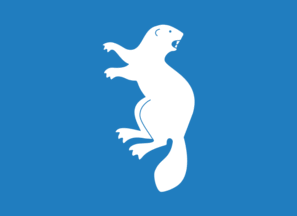
Flag of Åmli Municipality

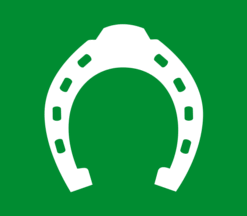
Flag of Åseral Municipality

=== Akershus ===
Flags of municipalities in Akershus county.

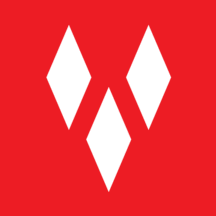
Flag of Asker Municipality

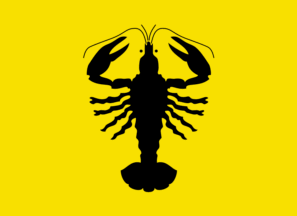
Flag of Aurskog-Høland Municipality

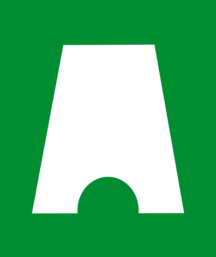
Flag of Bærum Municipality

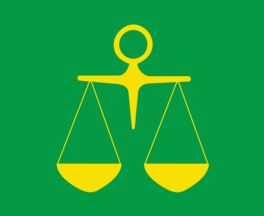
Flag of Eidsvoll Municipality

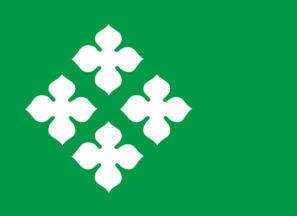
Flag of Enebakk Municipality

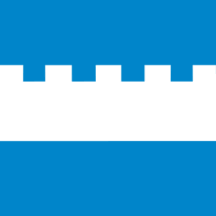
Flag of Frogn Municipality

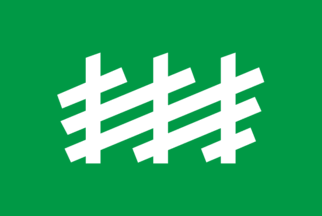
Flag of Gjerdrum Municipality

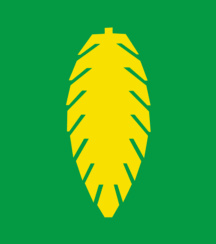
Flag of Hurdal Municipality

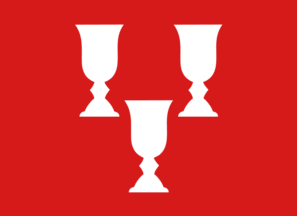
Flag of Jevnaker Municipality

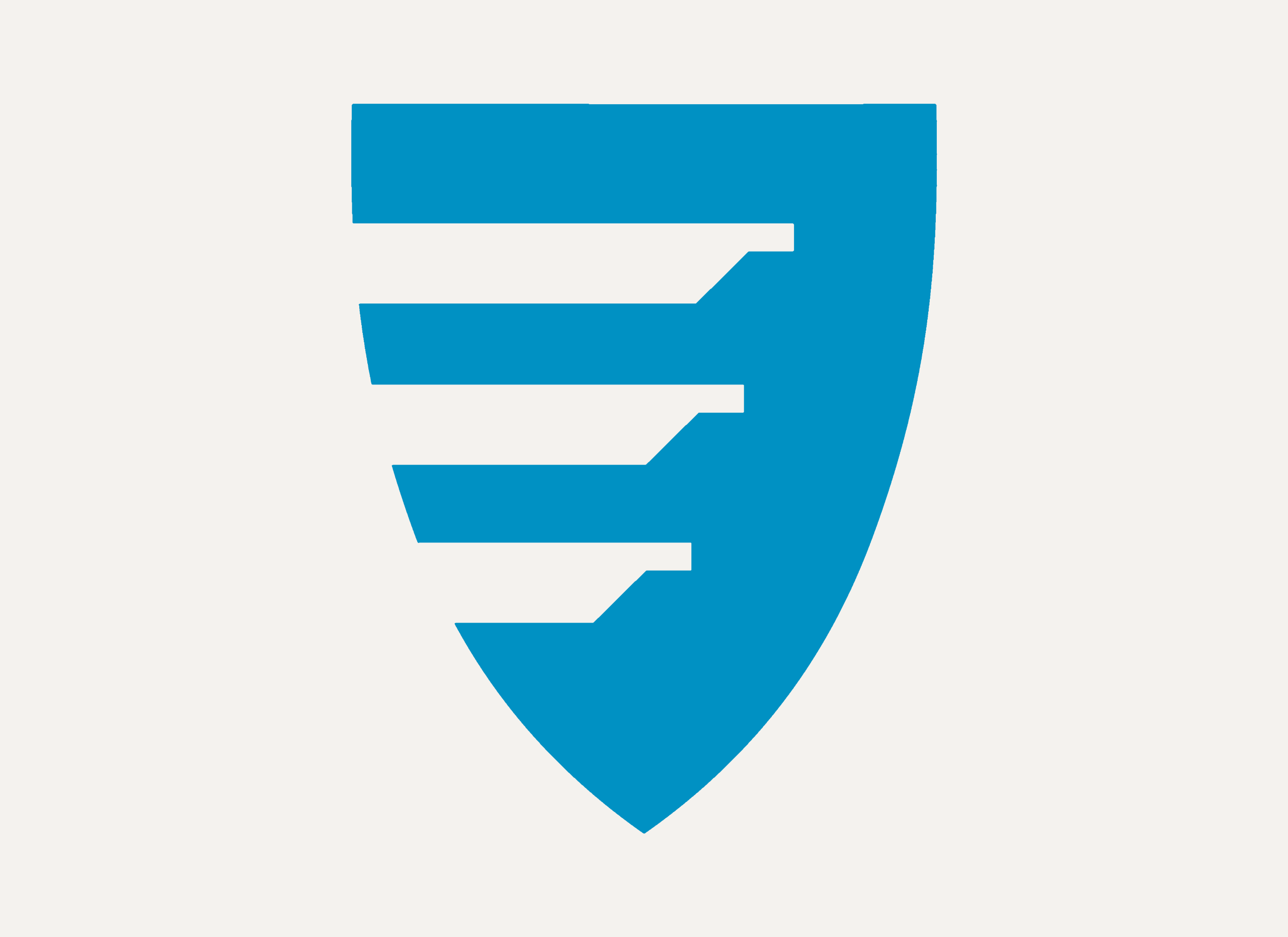
Flag of Lillestrøm Municipality

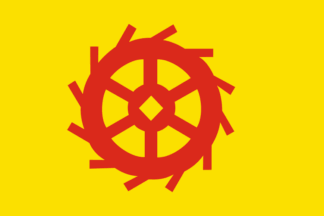
Flag of Lørenskog Municipality

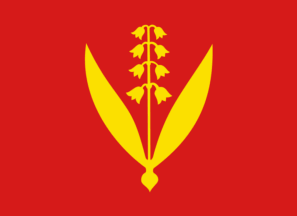
Flag of Lunner Municipality

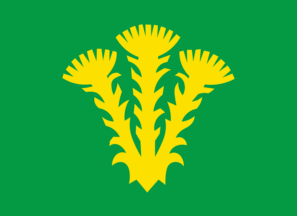
Flag of Nannestad Municipality

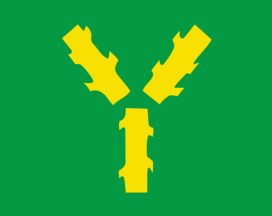
Flag of Nes Municipality

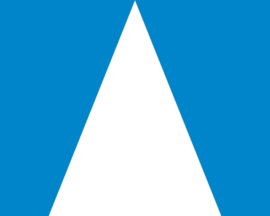
Flag of Nesodden Municipality

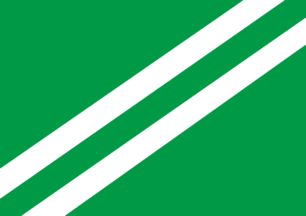
Flag of Nittedal Municipality

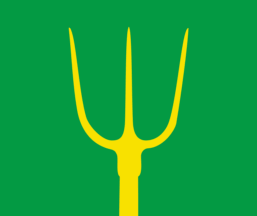
Flag of Rælingen Municipality

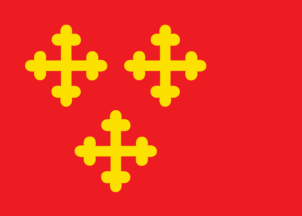
Flag of Vestby Municipality

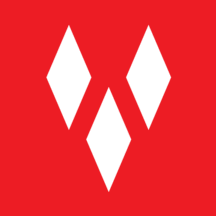
Flag of Ås Municipality

=== Buskerud ===
Flags of municipalities in Buskerud county.

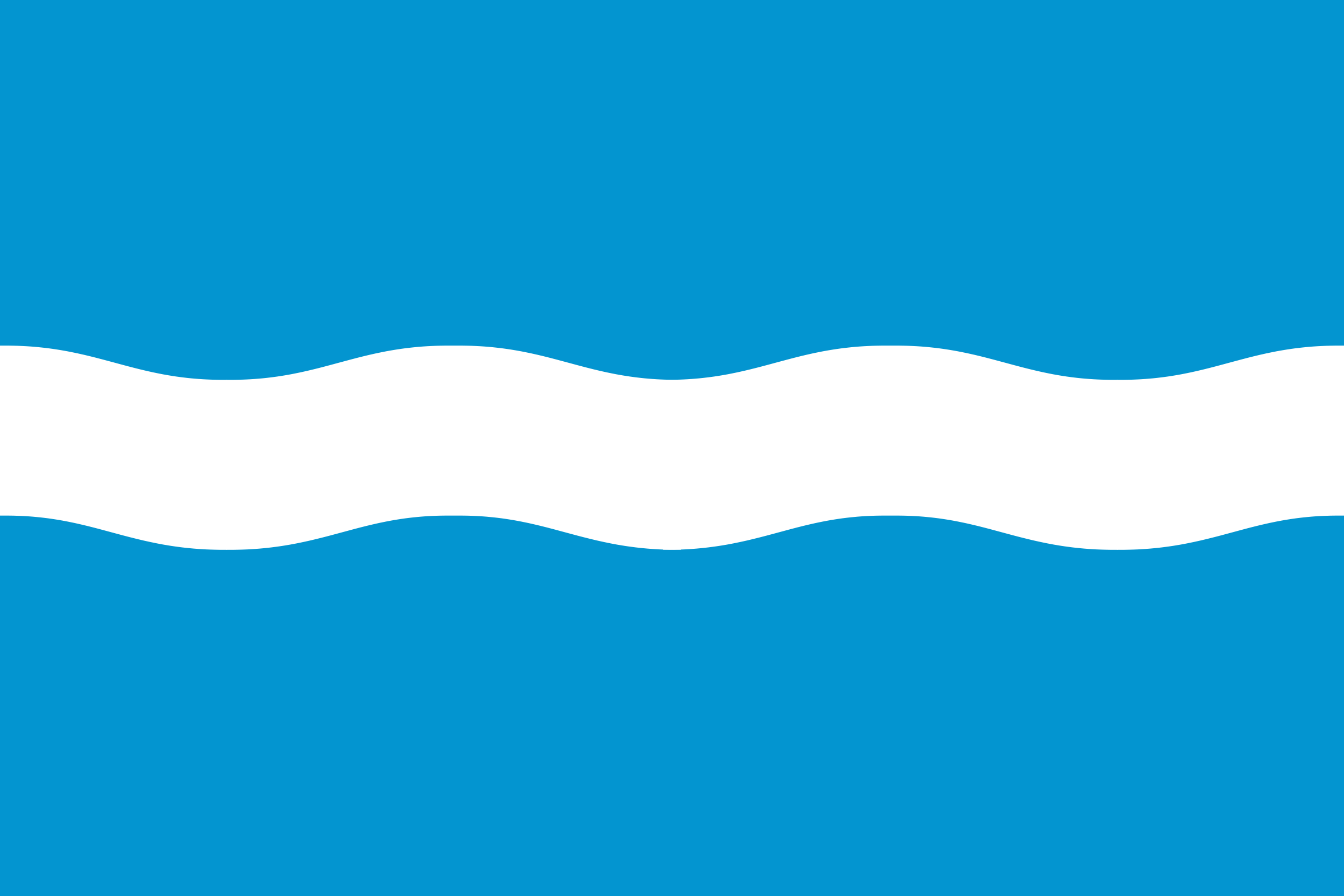
Flag of Drammen Municipality

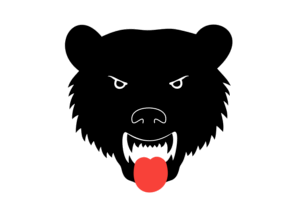
Flag of Flå Municipality

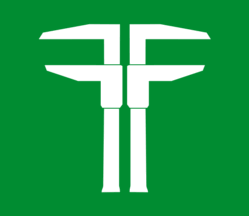
Flag of Flesberg Municipality

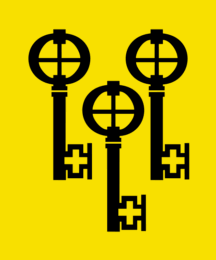
Flag of Gol Municipality

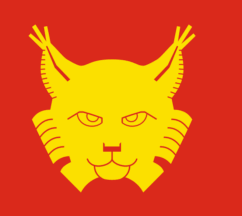
Flag of Hemsedal Municipality

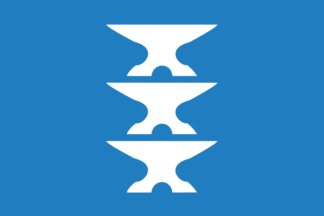
Flag of Hol Municipality

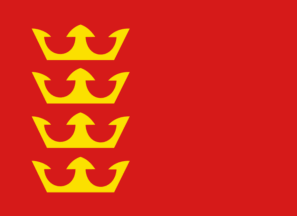
Flag of Hole Municipality

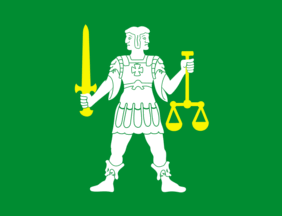
Flag of Kongsberg Municipality

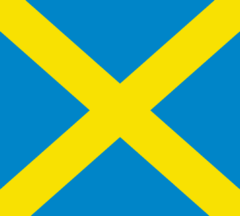
Flag of Krødsherad Municipality

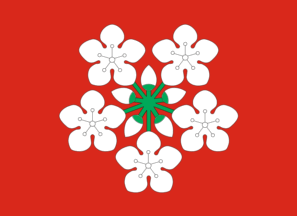
Flag of Lier Municipality

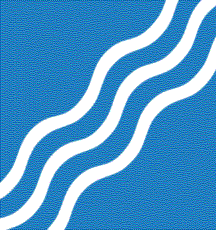
Flag of Modum Municipality

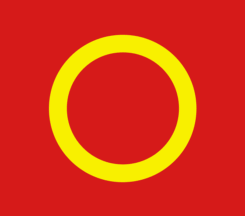
Flag of Ringerike Municipality

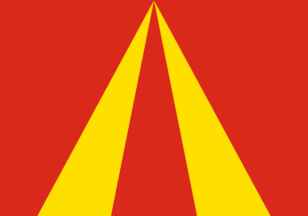
Flag of Rollag Municipality

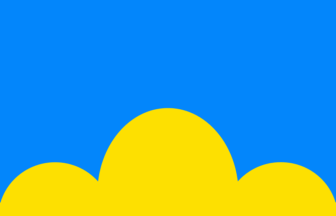
Flag of Sigdal Municipality

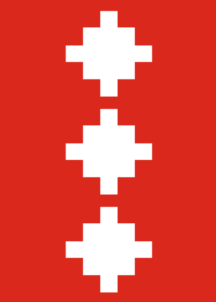
Flag of Ål Municipality

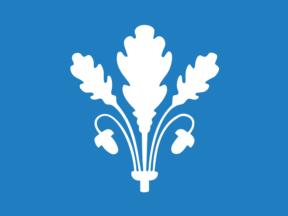
Flag of Øvre Eiker Municipality

=== Finnmark ===
Flags of municipalities in Finnmark county.

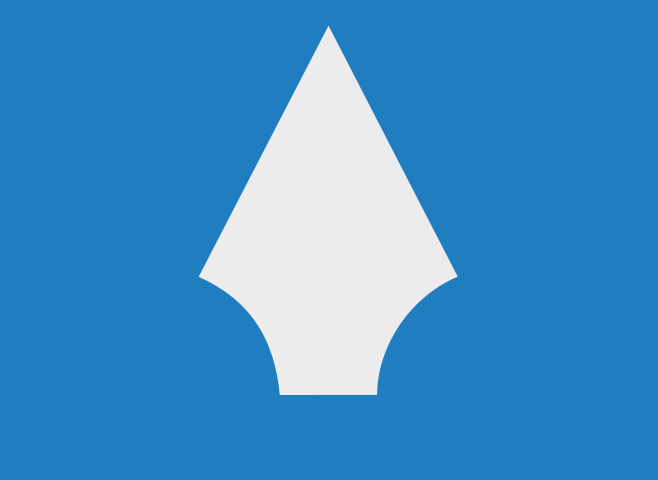
Flag of Alta Municipality

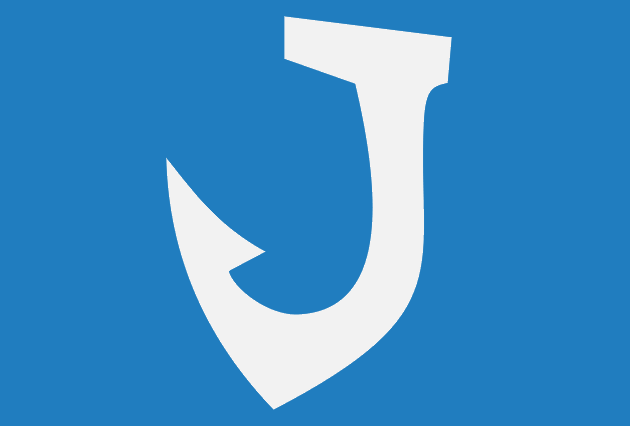
Flag of Båtsfjord Municipality

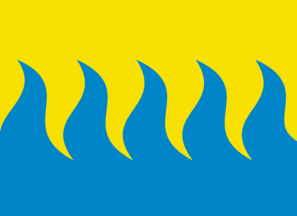
Flag of Berlevåg Municipality

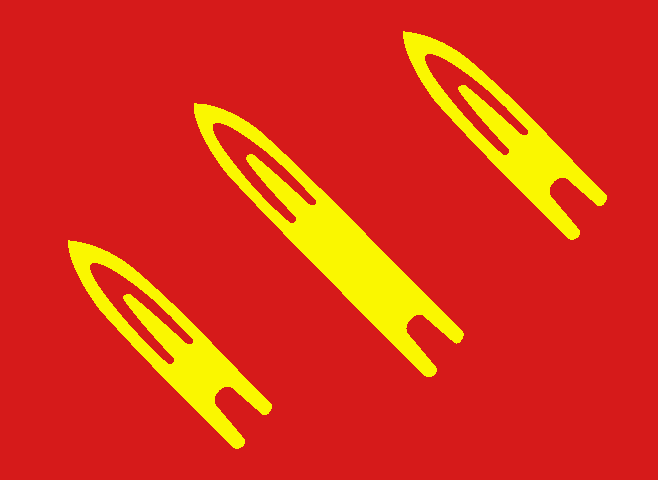
Flag of Gamvik Municipality

Flag of Hammerfest Municipality

Flag of Hasvik Municipality

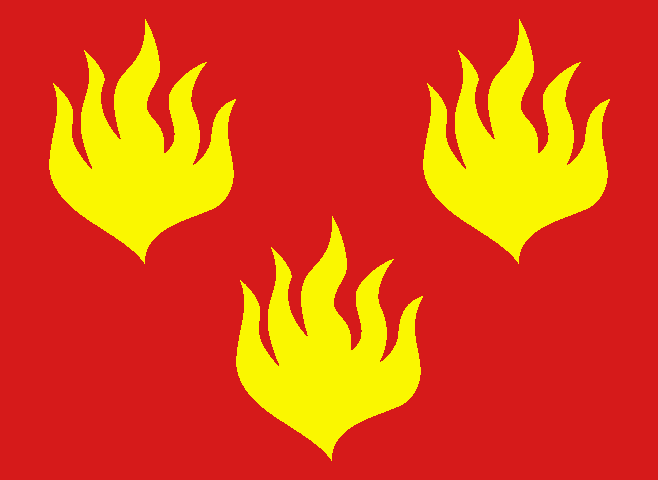
Flag of Karasjok Municipality

Flag of Kautokeino Municipality

Flag of Lebesby Municipality

Flag of Loppa Municipality

Flag of Måsøy Municipality

Flag of Nesseby Municipality

Flag of Nordkapp Municipality

Flag of Porsanger Municipality

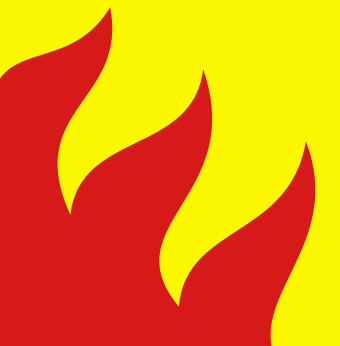
Flag of Sør-Varanger Municipality

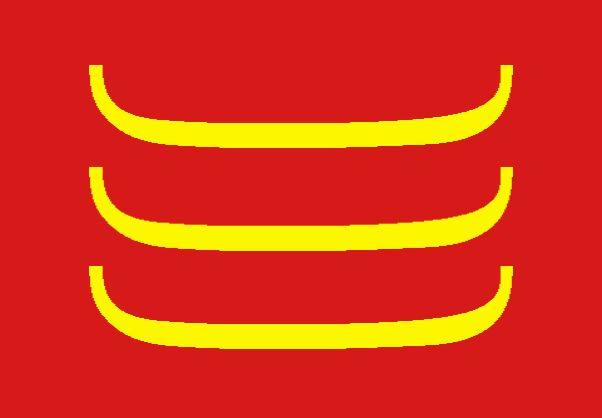
Flag of Tana Municipality

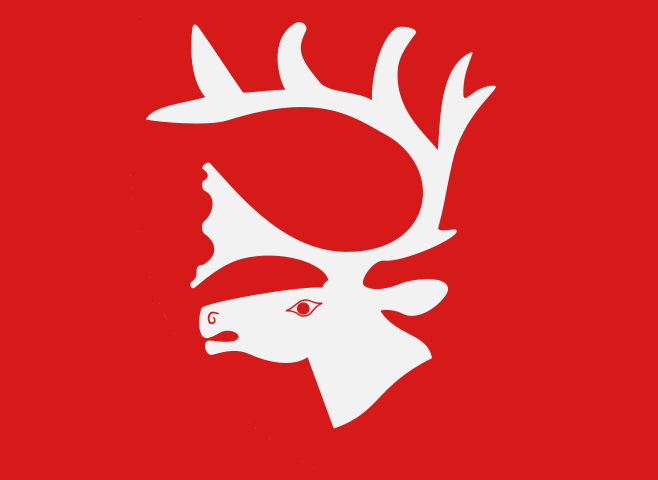
Flag of Vadsø Municipality

=== Innlandet ===
Flags of municipalities in Innlandet county.

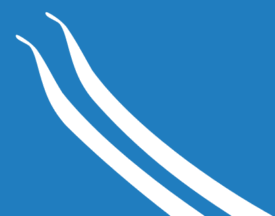
Flag of Alvdal Municipality

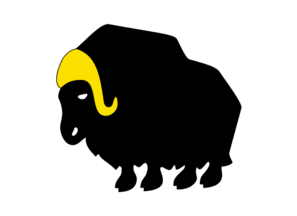
Flag of Dovre Municipality

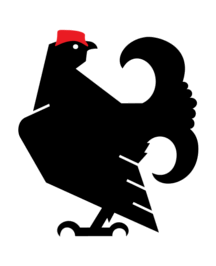
Flag of Eidskog Municipality

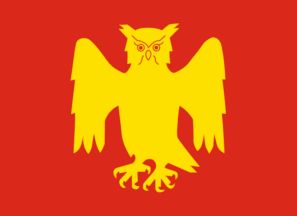
Flag of Elverum Municipality

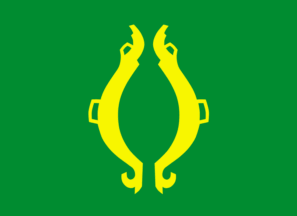
Flag of Engerdal Municipality

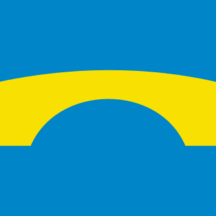
Flag of Etnedal Municipality

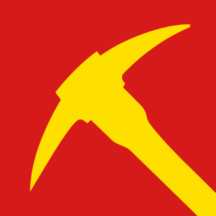
Flag of Folldal Municipality

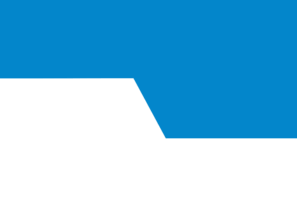
Flag of Gausdal Municipality

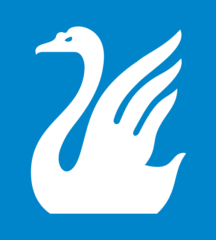
Flag of Gjøvik Municipality

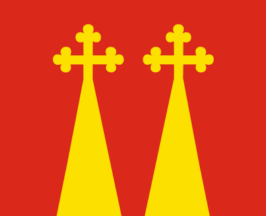
Flag of Gran Municipality

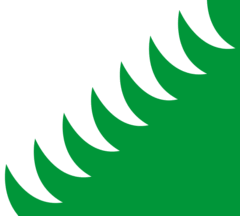
Flag of Grue Municipality

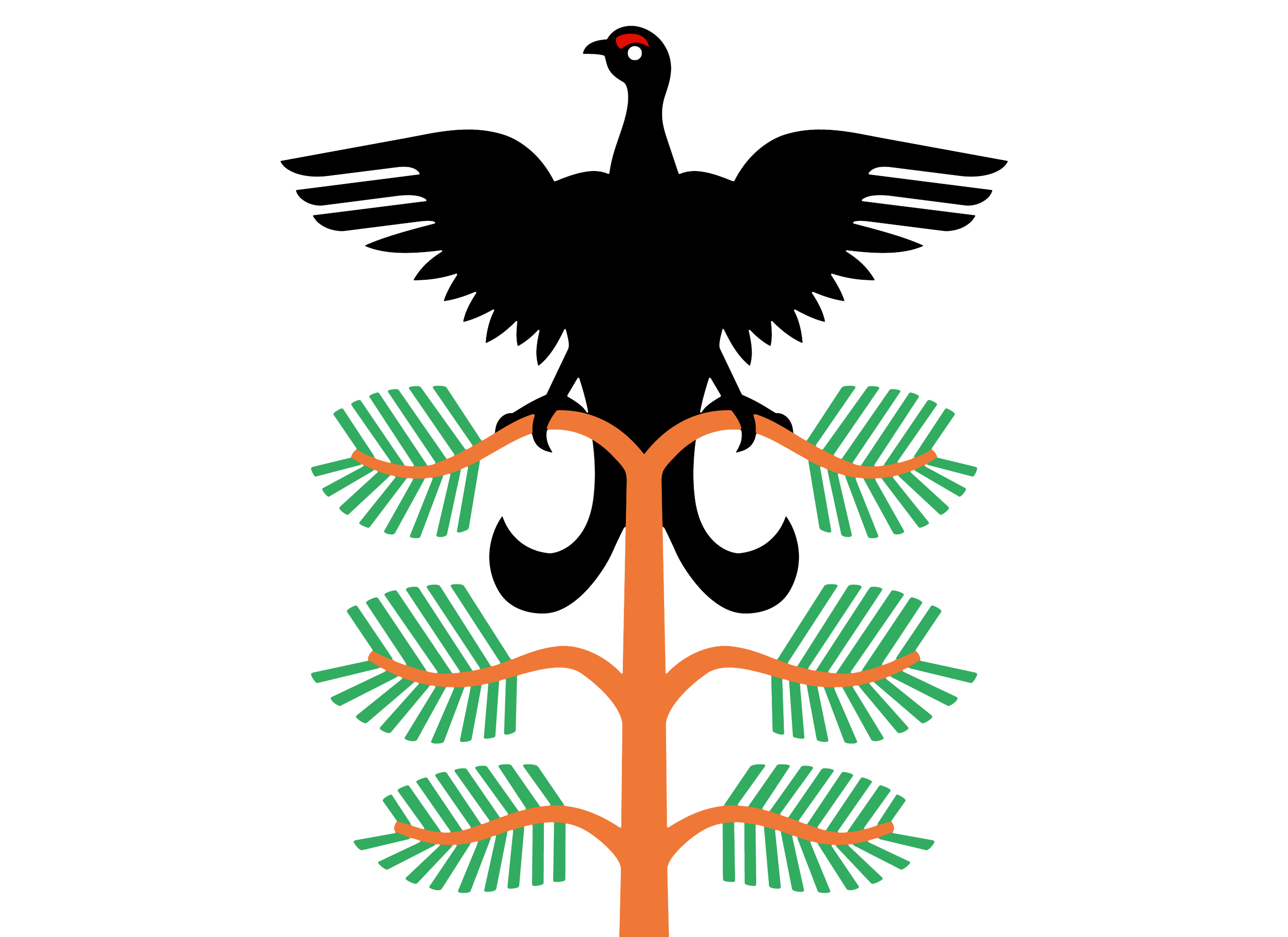
Flag of Hamar Municipality

Flag of Lesja Municipality

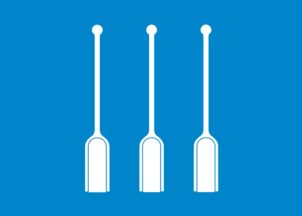
Flag of Lom Municipality

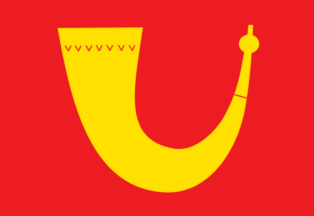
Flag of Løten Municipality

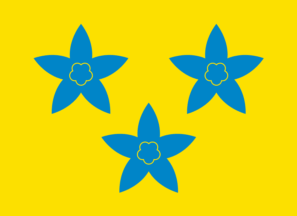
Flag of Nord-Aurdal Municipality

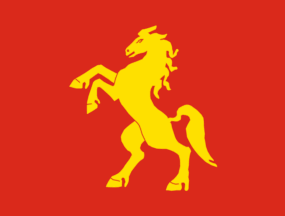
Flag of Nord-Fron Municipality

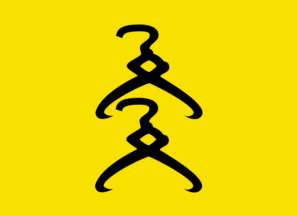
Flag of Nord-Odal Municipality

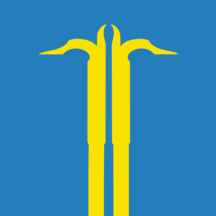
Flag of Nordre Land Municipality

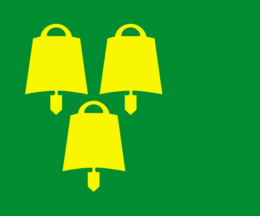
Flag of Os Municipality

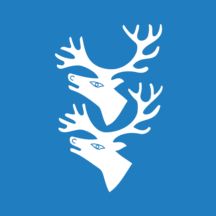
Flag of Rendalen Municipality

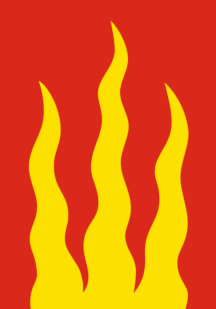
Flag of Ringebu Municipality

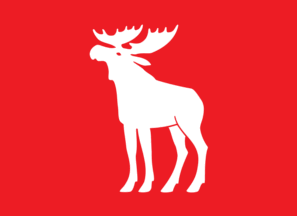
Flag of Ringsaker Municipality

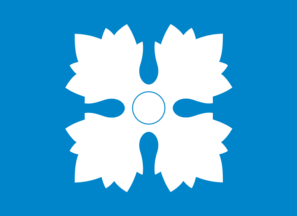
Flag of Skjåk Municipality

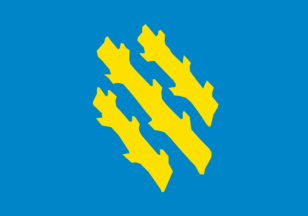
Flag of Søndre Land Municipality

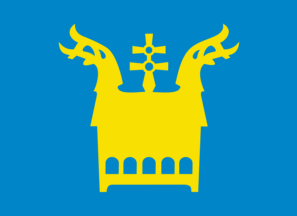
Flag of Sør-Aurdal Municipality

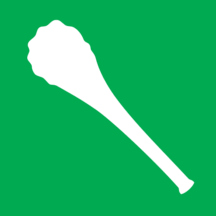
Flag of Sør-Fron Municipality

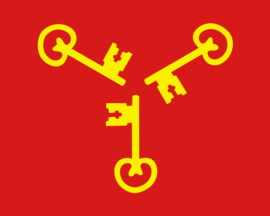
Flag of Sør-Odal Municipality

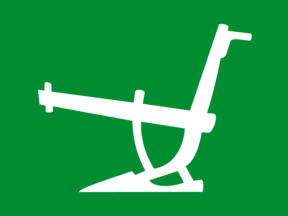
Flag of Stange Municipality

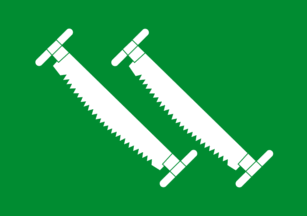
Flag of Stor-Elvdal Municipality

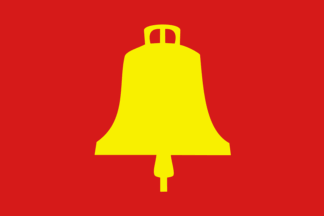
Flag of Tolga Municipality

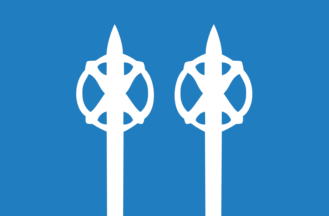
Flag of Trysil Municipality

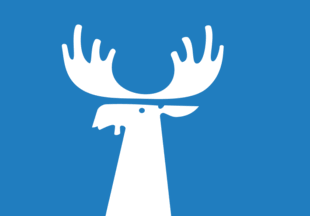
Flag of Tynset Municipality

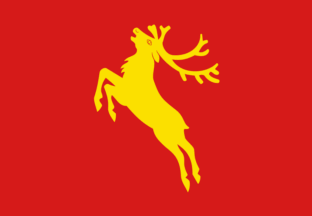
Flag of Vågå Municipality

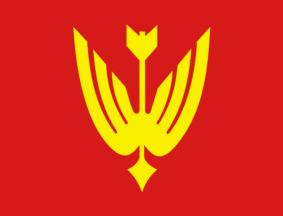
Flag of Våler Municipality

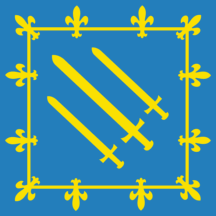
Flag of Vang Municipality

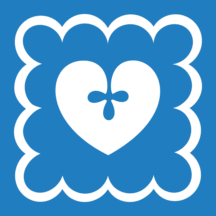
Flag of Vestre Slidre Municipality

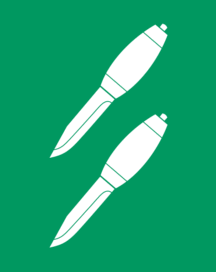
Flag of Vestre Toten Municipality

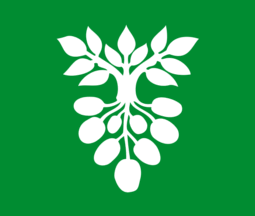
Flag of Østre Toten Municipality

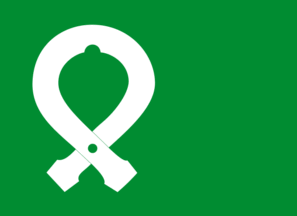
Flag of Øyer Municipality

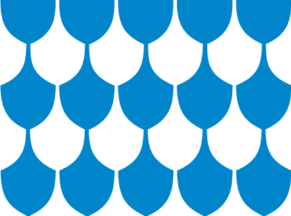
Flag of Øystre Slidre Municipality

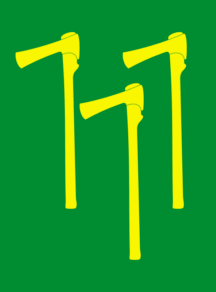
Flag of Åmot Municipality

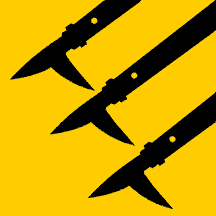
Flag of Åsnes Municipality

=== Møre og Romsdal ===
Flags of municipalities in Møre og Romsdal county.

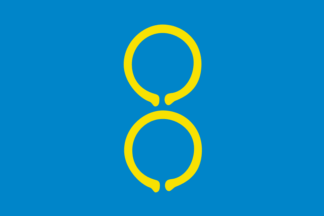
Flag of Aukra Municipality

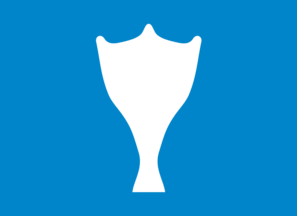
Flag of Aure Municipality

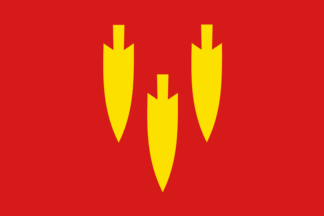
Flag of Averøy Municipality

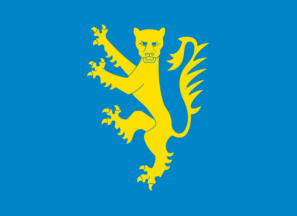
Flag of Giske Municipality

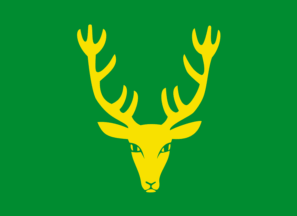
Flag of Gjemnes Municipality

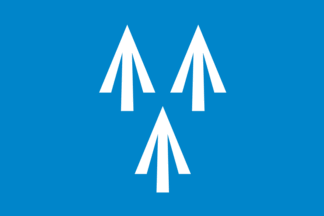
Flag of Hareid Municipality

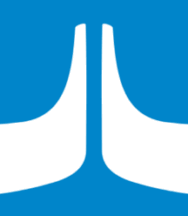
Flag of Herøy Municipality

Flag of Molde Municipality

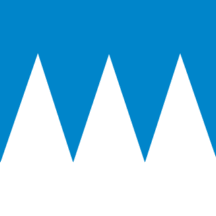
Flag of Rauma Municipality

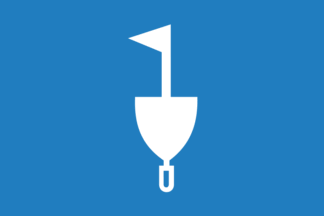
Flag of Sande Municipality

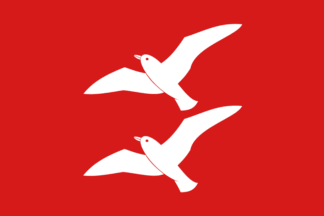
Flag of Smøla Municipality

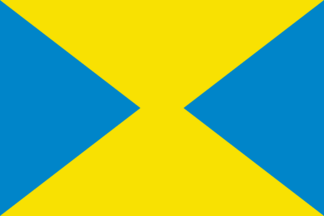
Flag of Stranda Municipality

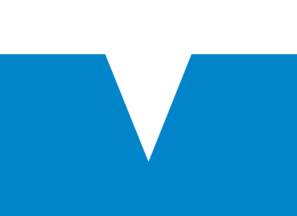
Flag of Sula Municipality

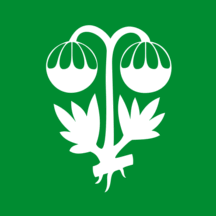
Flag of Sunndal Municipality

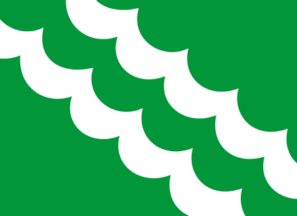
Flag of Surnadal Municipality

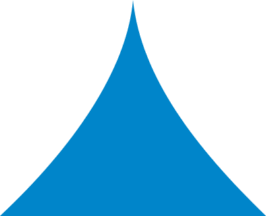
Flag of Sykkylven Municipality

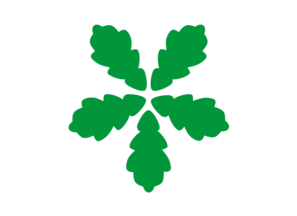
Flag of Tingvoll Municipality

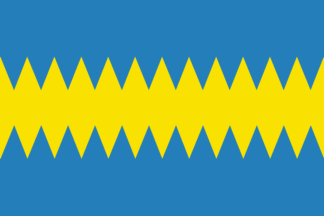
Flag of Ulstein Municipality

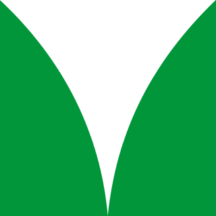
Flag of Vanylven Municipality

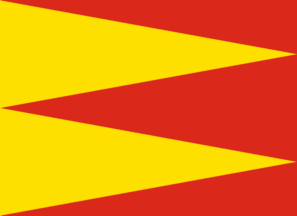
Flag of Vestnes Municipality

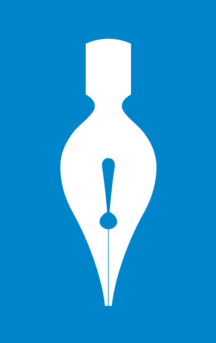
Former flag of Volda Municipality

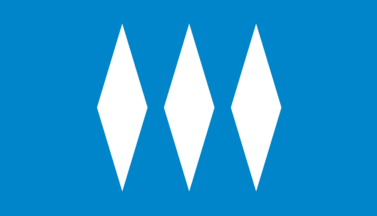
Flag of Ørsta Municipality

=== Nordland ===
Flags of municipalities in Nordland county.

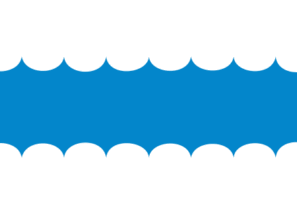
Flag of Alstahaug Municipality

Flag of Andøy Municipality

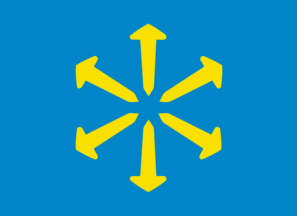
Flag of Bindal Municipality

Flag of Bodø Municipality

Flag of Bø Municipality

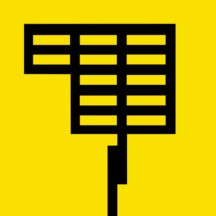
Flag of Brønnøy Municipality

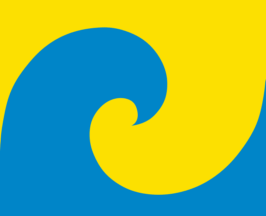
Flag of Dønna Municipality

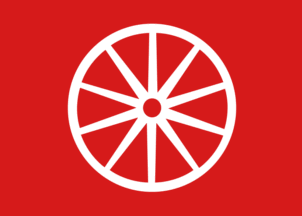
Flag of Evenes Municipality

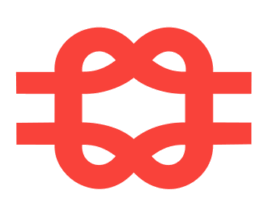
Flag of Fauske Municipality

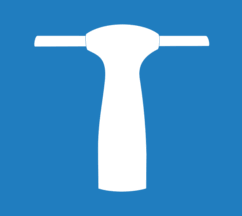
Flag of Flakstad Municipality

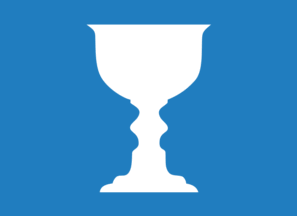
Flag of Gildeskål Municipality

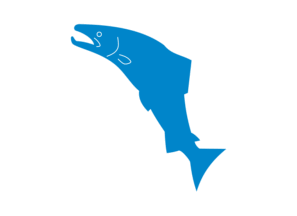
Flag of Grane Municipality

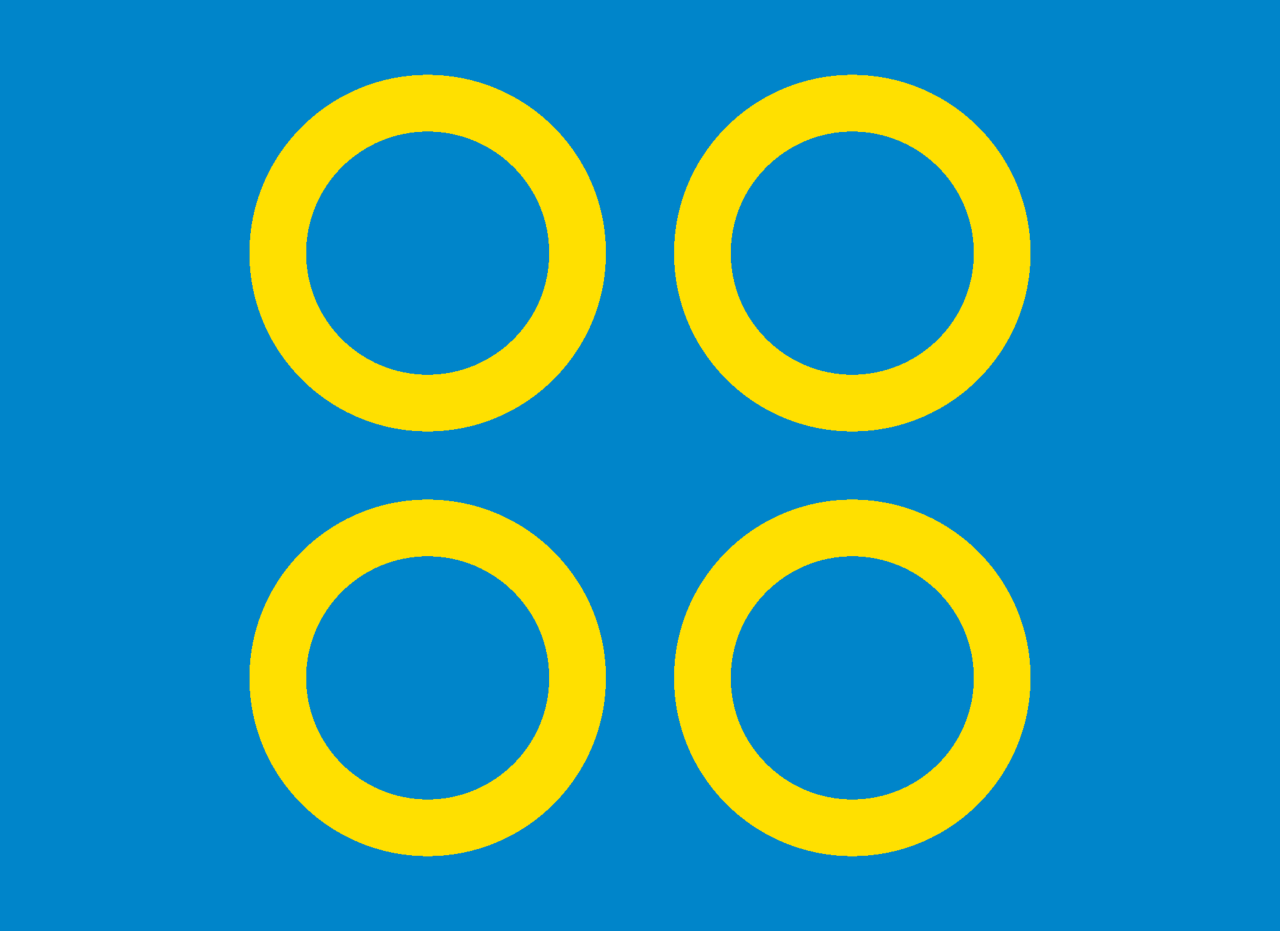
Flag of Hadsel Municipality

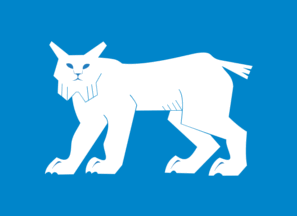
Former flag of Hamarøy Municipality

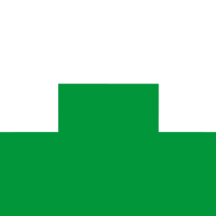
Flag of Hattfjelldal Municipality

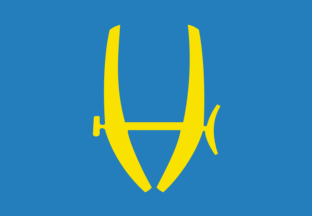
Flag of Hemnes Municipality

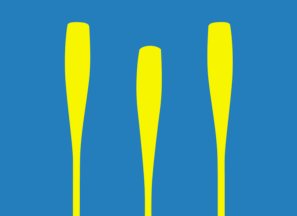
Flag of Herøy Municipality

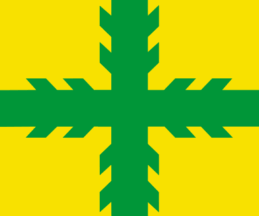
Flag of Leirfjord Municipality

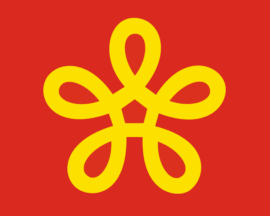
Flag of Lødingen Municipality

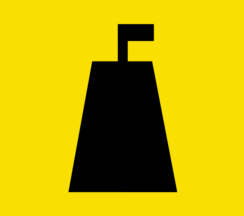
Flag of Lurøy Municipality

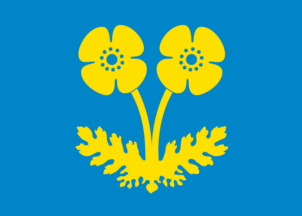
Flag of Meløy Municipality

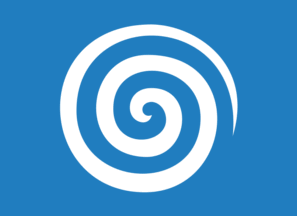
Flag of Moskenes Municipality

Former flag of Narvik Municipality (1951-2019)

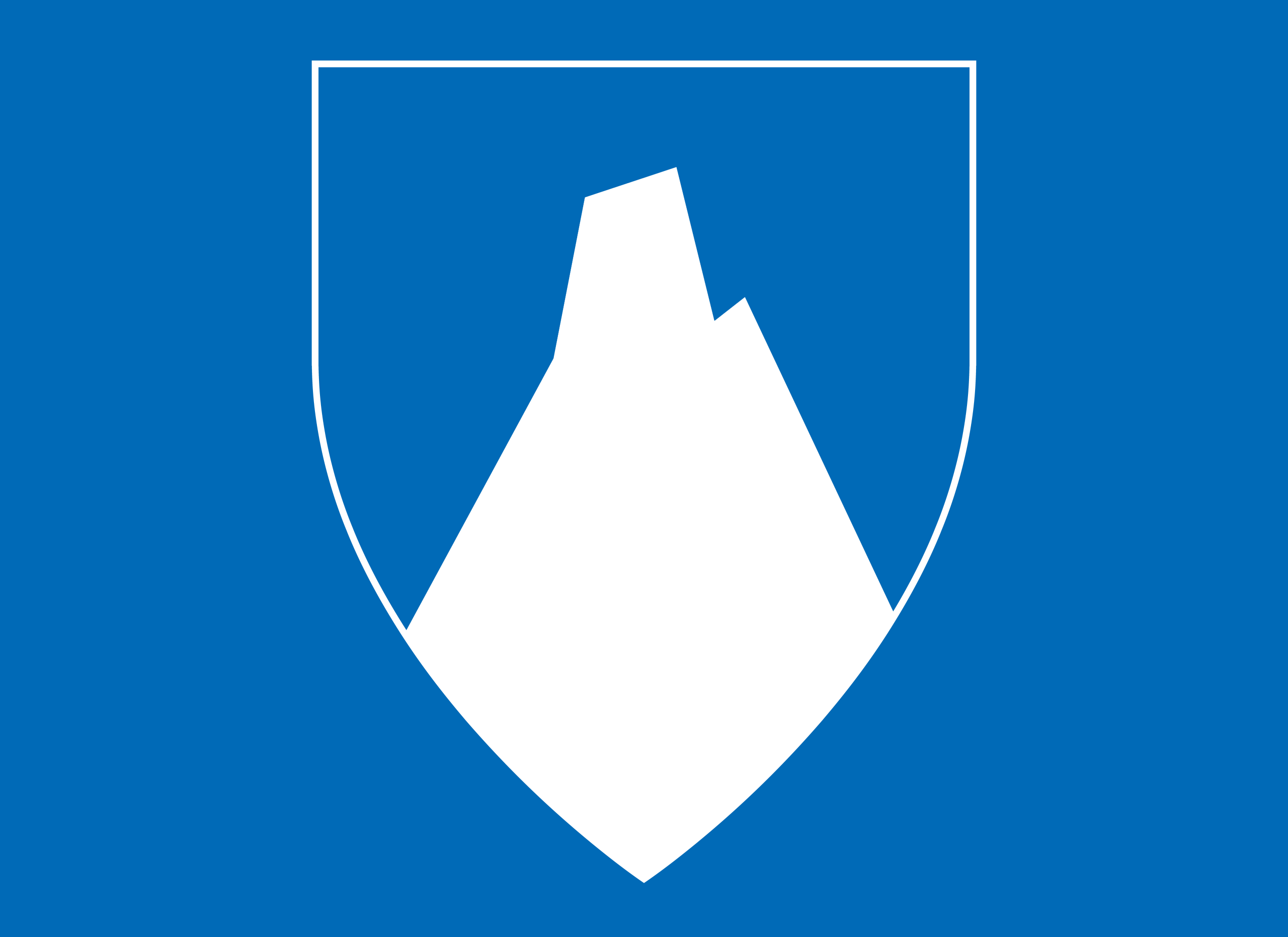
Flag of Narvik Municipality

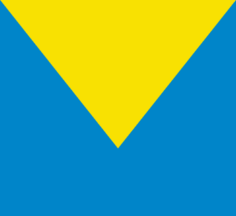
Flag of Nesna Municipality

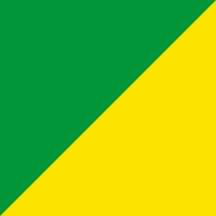
Flag of Rana Municipality

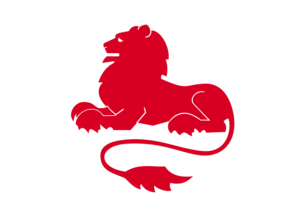
Flag of Rødøy Municipality

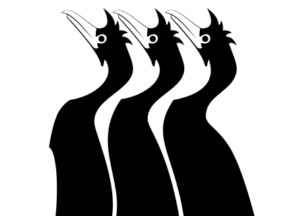
Flag of Røst Municipality

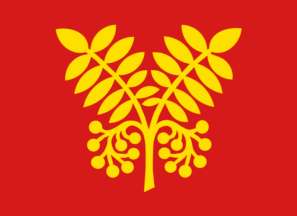
Flag of Saltdal Municipality

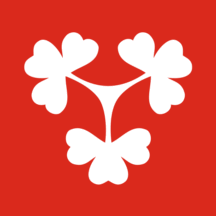
Flag of Sømna Municipality

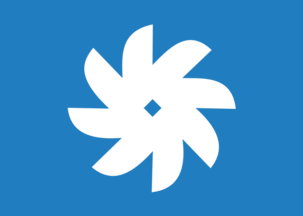
Flag of Sørfold Municipality

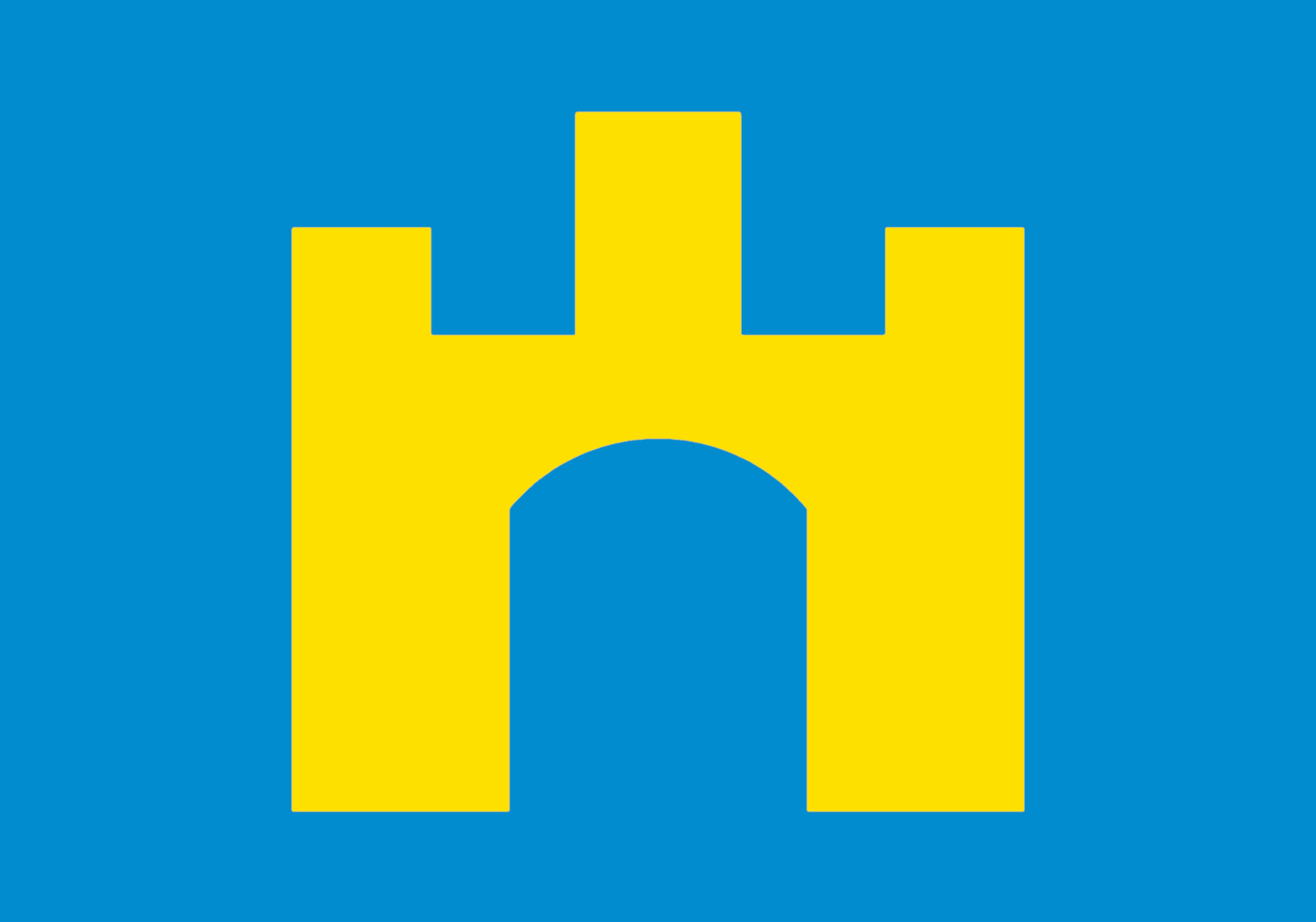
Flag of Sortland Municipality

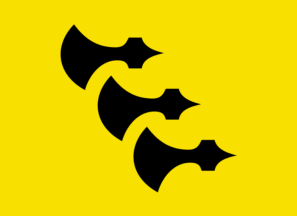
Flag of Steigen Municipality

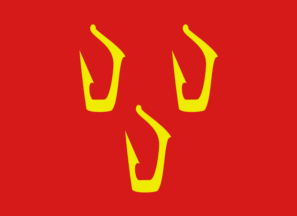
Flag of Træna Municipality

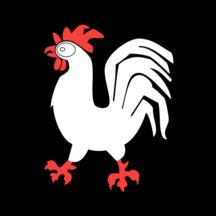
Flag of Vefsn Municipality

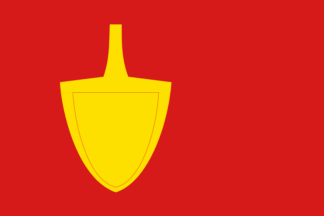
Flag of Vega Municipality

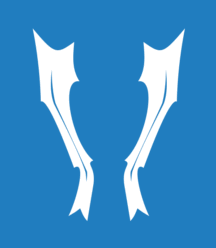
Flag of Vestvågøy Municipality

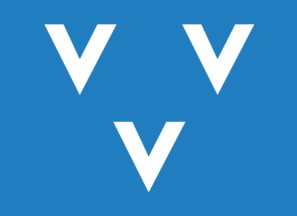
Flag of Vevelstad Municipality

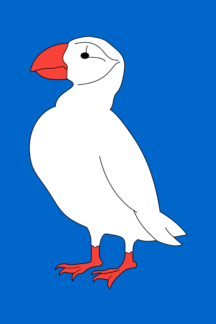
Flag of Værøy Municipality

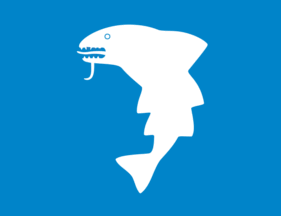
Flag of Vågan Municipality

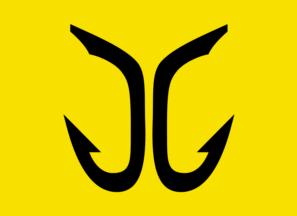
Flag of Øksnes Municipality

=== Oslo ===
Flag of Oslo Municipality

Former flag of Oslo Municipality (1924–2000)

=== Rogaland ===
Flags of municipalities in Rogaland county.

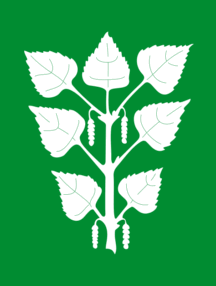
Flag of Bjerkreim Municipality

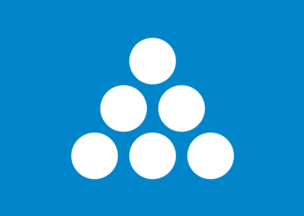
Flag of Bokn Municipality

Flag of Eigersund Municipality

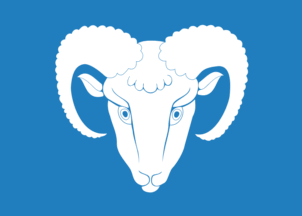
Flag of Gjesdal Municipality

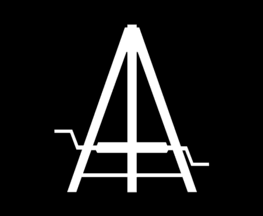
Flag of Hå Municipality

Flag of Haugesund Municipality

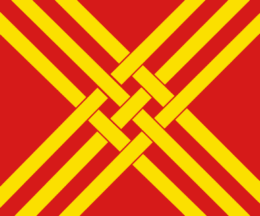
Flag of Hjelmeland Municipality

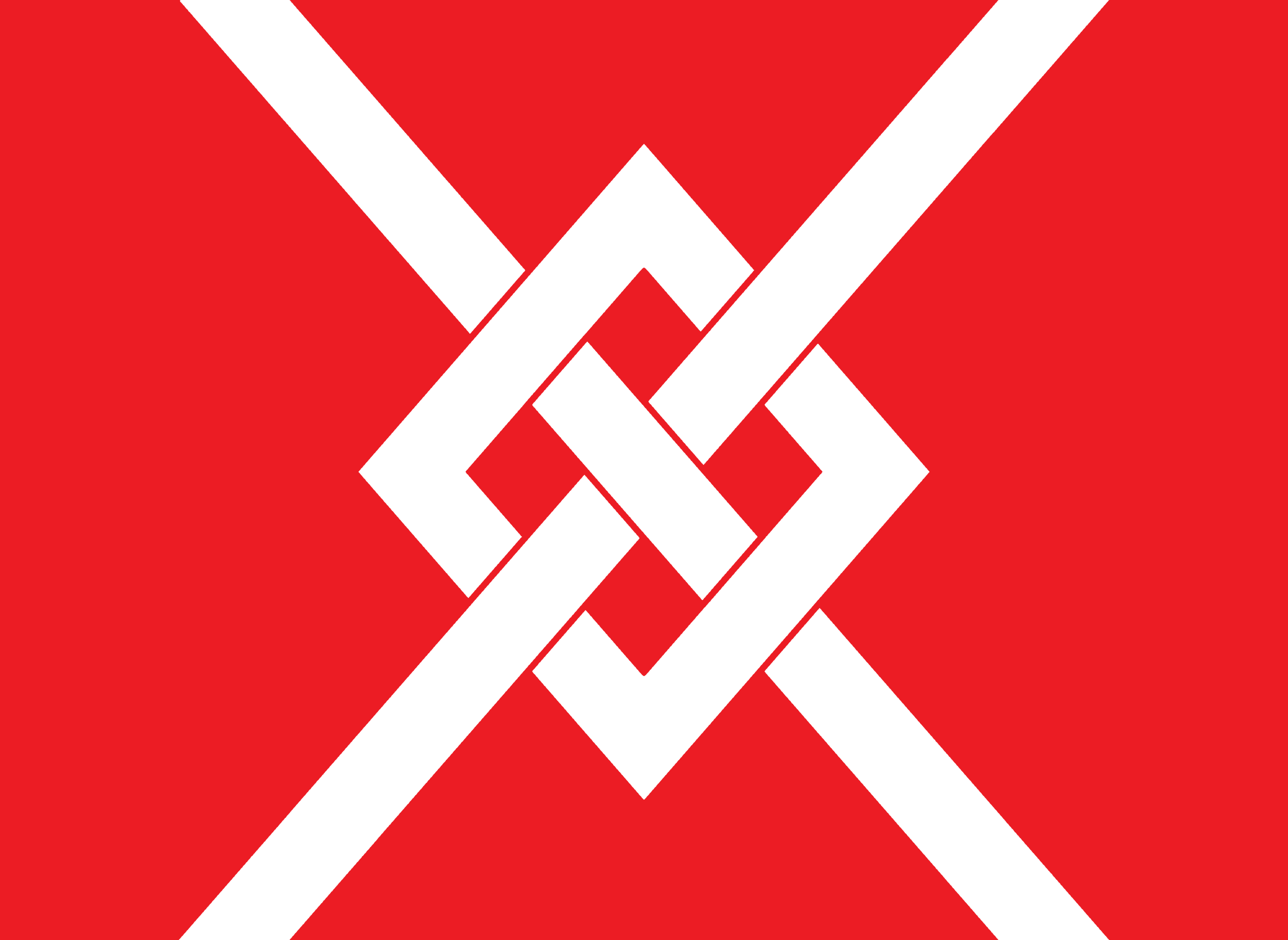
Flag of Karmøy Municipality

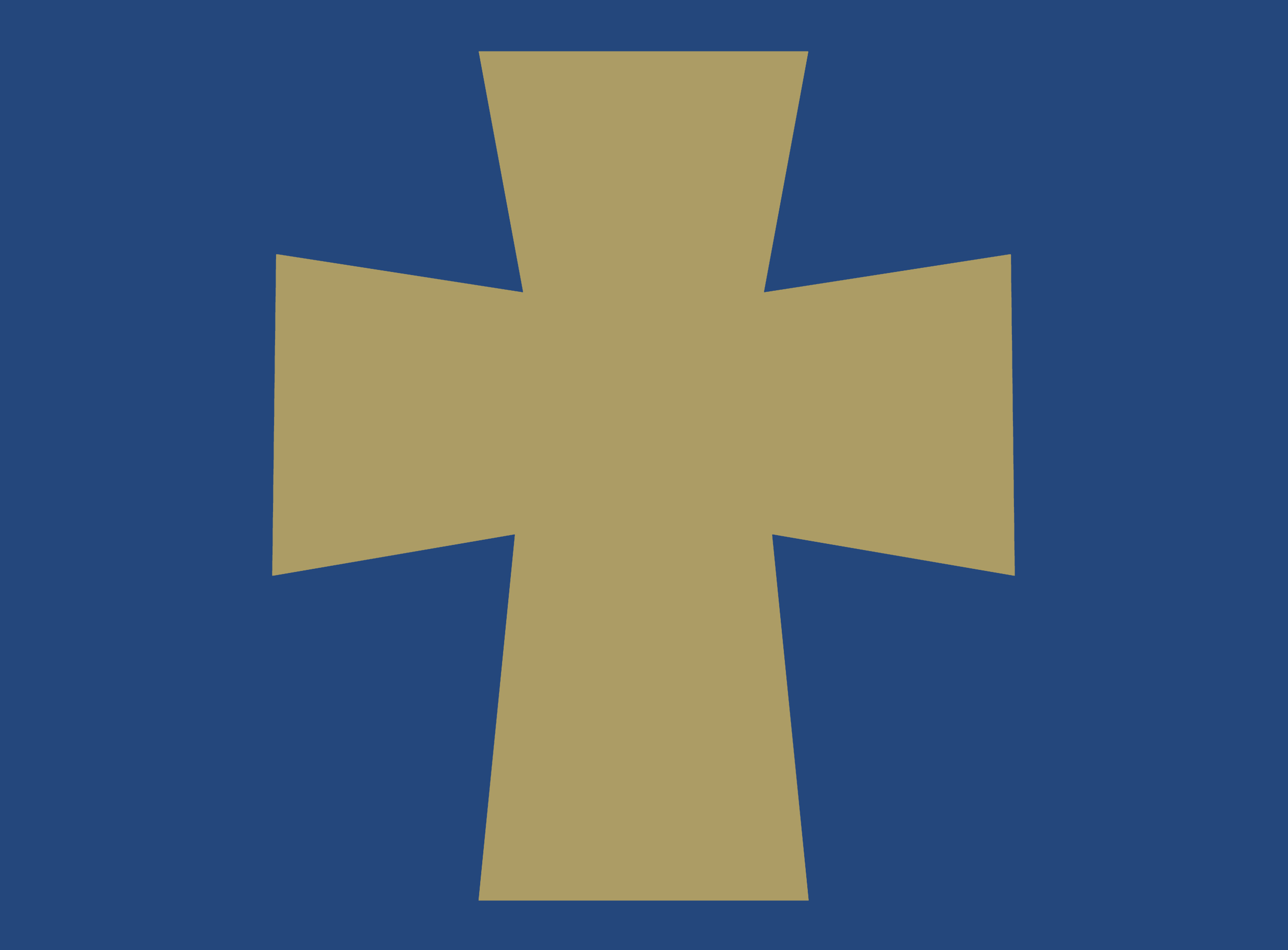
Flag of Klepp Municipality

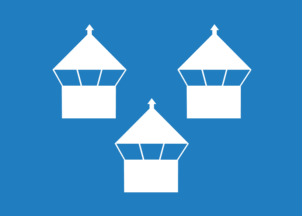
Flag of Kvitsøy Municipality

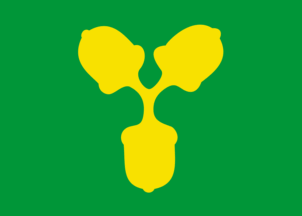
Flag of Lund Municipality

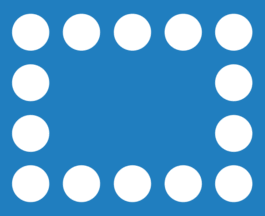
Flag of Randaberg Municipality

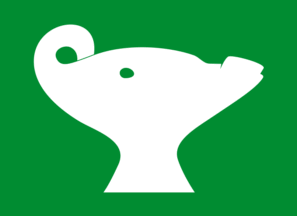
Flag of Sandnes Municipality

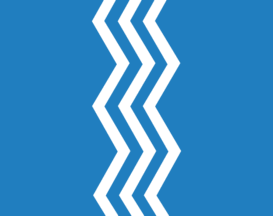
Flag of Sauda Municipality

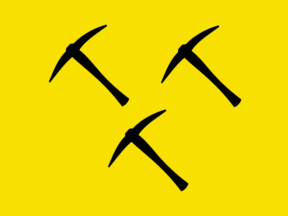
Flag of Sokndal Municipality

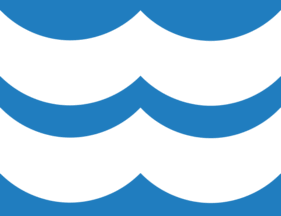
Flag of Sola Municipality

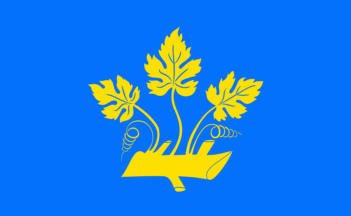
Flag of Stavanger Municipality

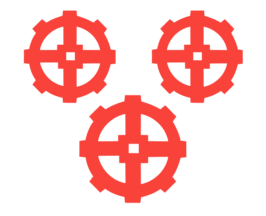
Flag of Strand Municipality

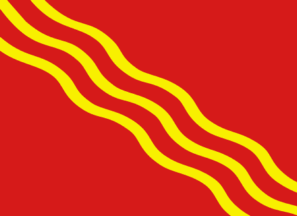
Flag of Suldal Municipality

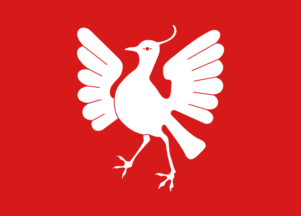
Flag of Time Municipality

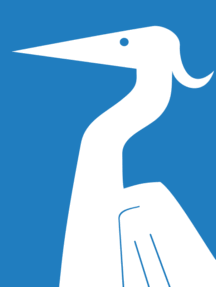
Flag of Tysvær Municipality

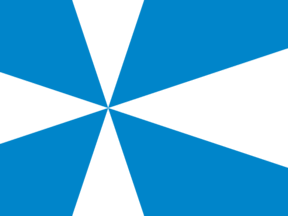
Flag of Utsira Municipality

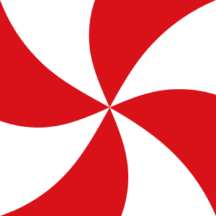
Flag of Vindafjord Municipality

=== Telemark ===
Flags of municipalities in Telemark county.

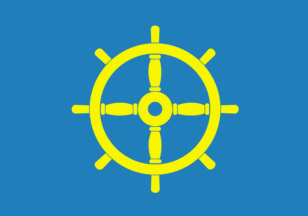
Flag of Bamble Municipality

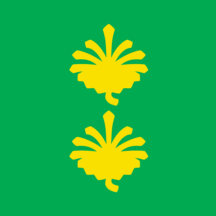
Flag of Drangedal Municipality

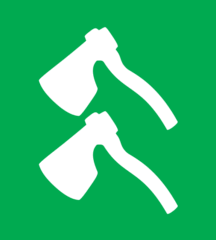
Flag of Fyresdal Municipality

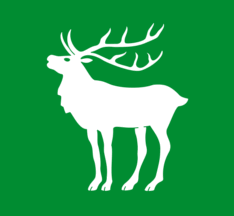
Flag of Hjartdal Municipality

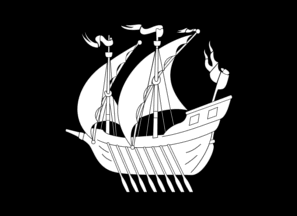
Flag of Kragerø Municipality

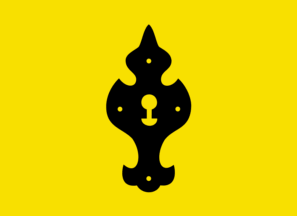
Flag of Kviteseid Municipality

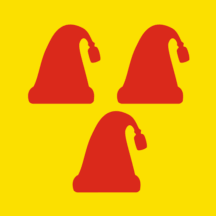
Flag of Nissedal Municipality

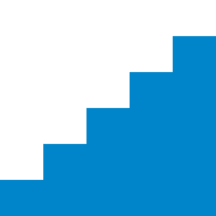
Flag of Nome Municipality

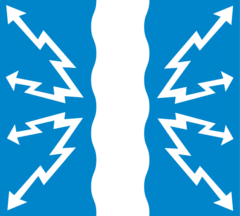
Flag of Notodden Municipality

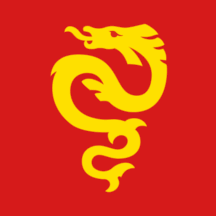
Flag of Seljord Municipality

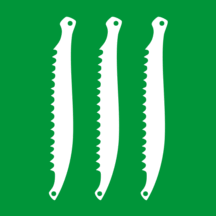
Flag of Siljan Municipality

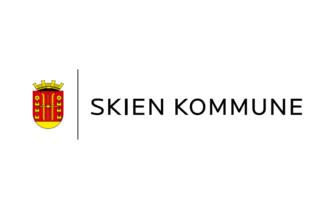
Flag of Skien Municipality

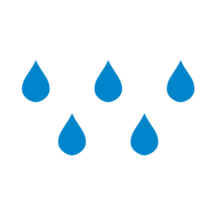
Flag of Tinn Municipality

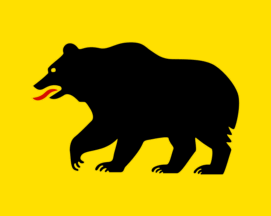
Flag of Tokke Municipality

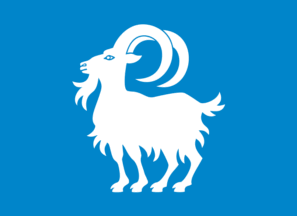
Flag of Vinje Municipality

=== Troms ===
Flags of municipalities in Troms county.

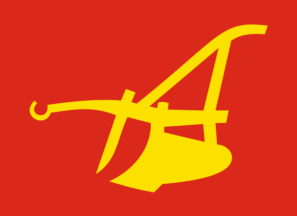
Flag of Balsfjord Municipality

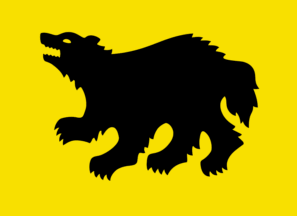
Flag of Bardu Municipality

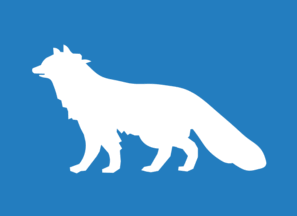
Flag of Dyrøy Municipality

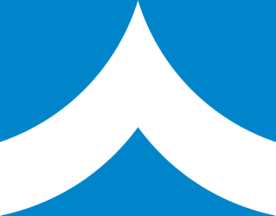
Flag of Gratangen Municipality

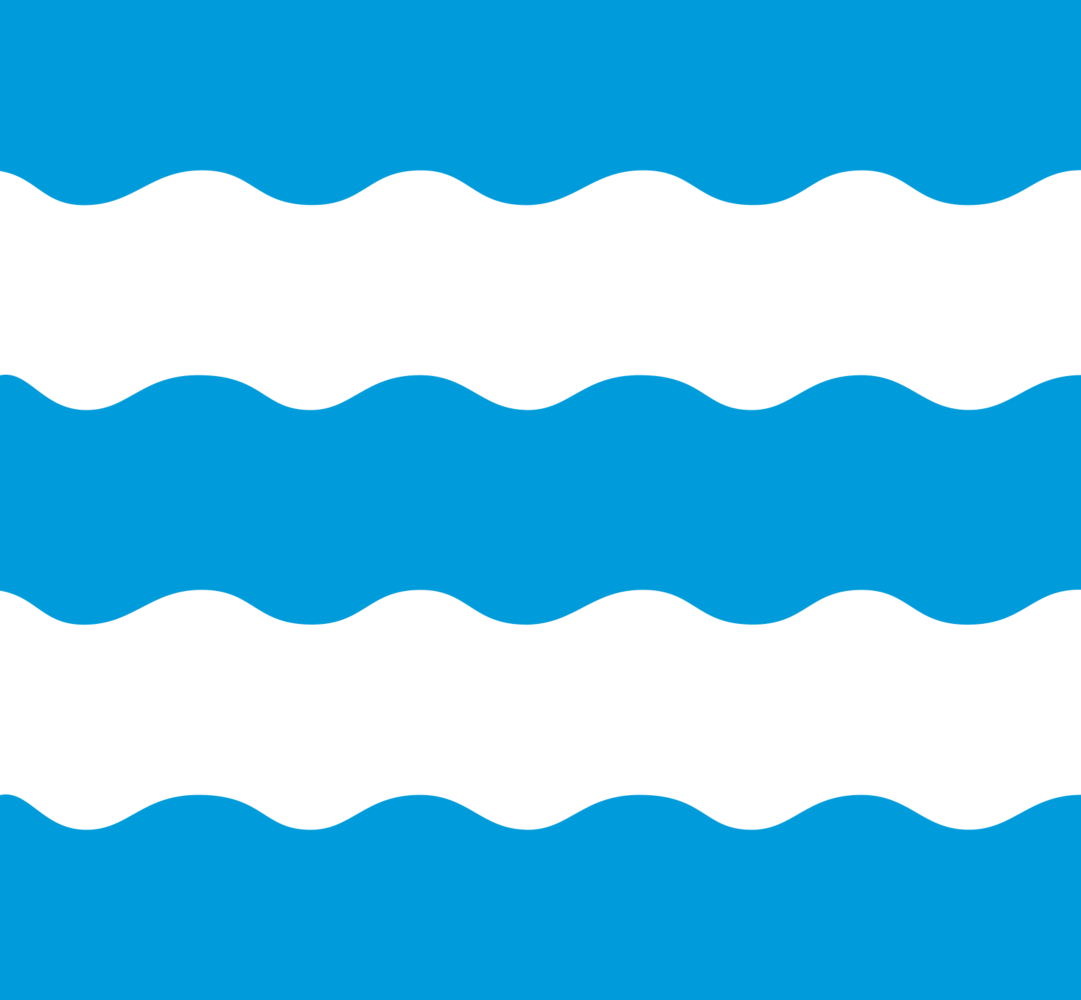
Flag of Harstad Municipality

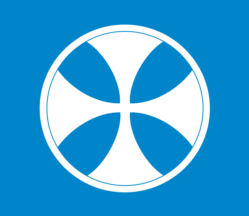
Flag of Ibestad Municipality

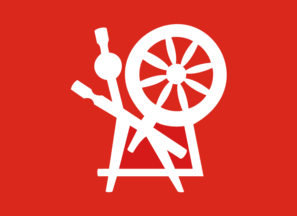
Flag of Kåfjord Municipality

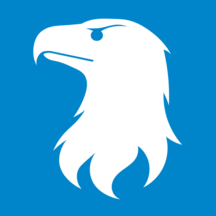
Flag of Karlsøy Municipality

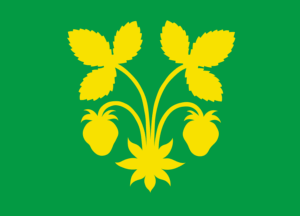
Flag of Kvæfjord Municipality

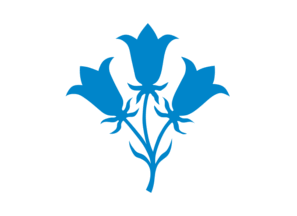
Flag of Kvænangen Municipality

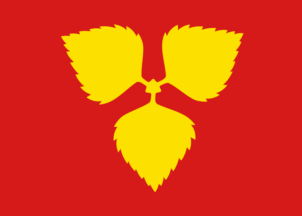
Flag of Lavangen Municipality

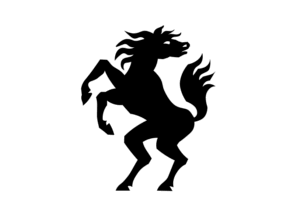
Flag of Lyngen Municipality

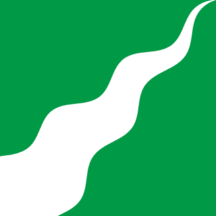
Flag of Målselv Municipality

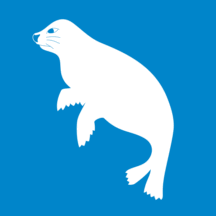
Flag of Salangen Municipality

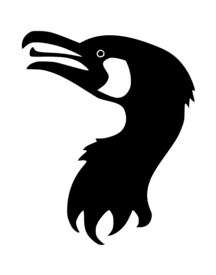
Flag of Skjervøy Municipality

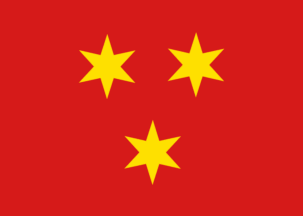
Flag of Sørreisa Municipality

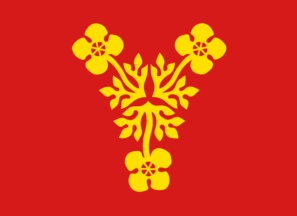
Flag of Storfjord Municipality

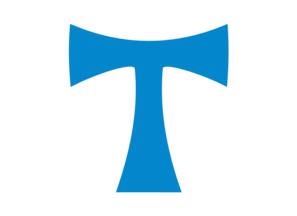
Flag of Tjeldsund Municipality

Flag of Tromsø Municipality

=== Trøndelag ===
Flags of municipalities in Trøndelag county.

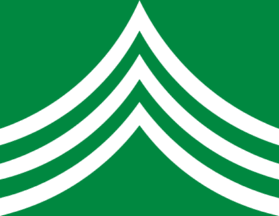
Flag of Flatanger Municipality

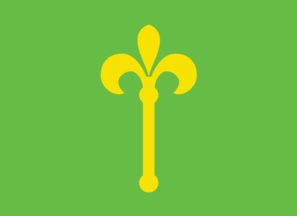
Flag of Frosta Municipality

Flag of Frøya Municipality

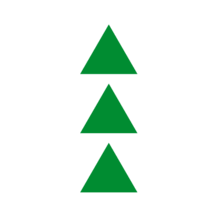
Flag of Grong Municipality

Flag of Hitra Municipality

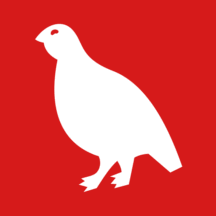
Flag of Holtålen Municipality

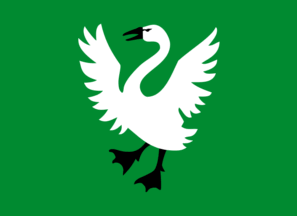
Flag of Høylandet Municipality

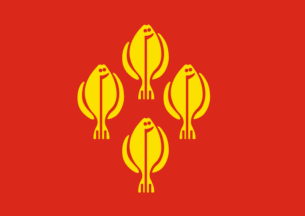
Flag of Inderøy Municipality

Flag of Indre Fosen Municipality

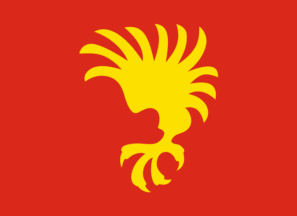
Flag of Leka Municipality

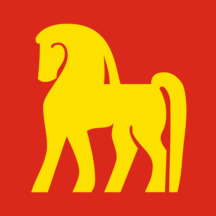
Flag of Levanger Municipality

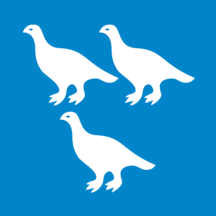
Flag of Lierne Municipality

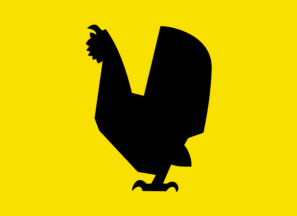
Flag of Malvik Municipality

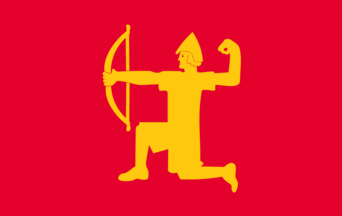
Flag of Melhus Municipality

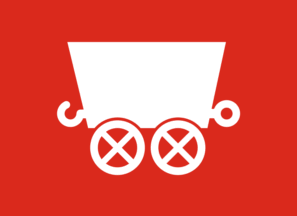
Flag of Meråker Municipality

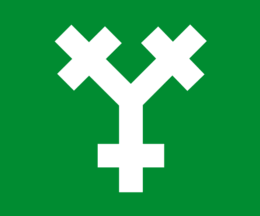
Flag of Midtre Gauldal Municipality

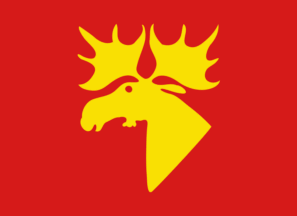
Flag of Namsos Municipality

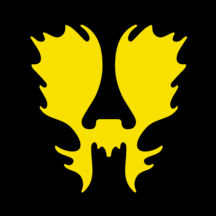
Flag of Namsskogan Municipality

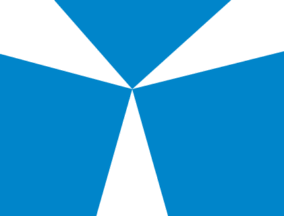
Flag of Oppdal Municipality

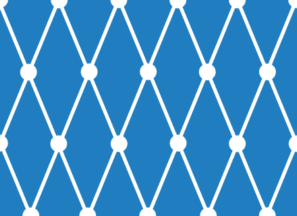
Flag of Osen Municipality

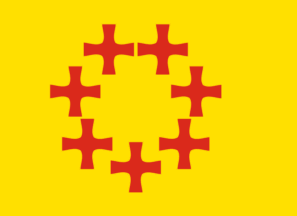
Flag of Overhalla Municipality

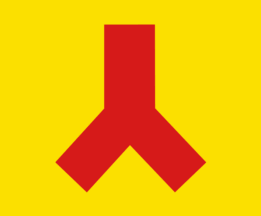
Flag of Rennebu Municipality

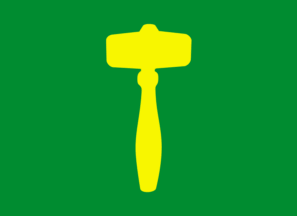
Flag of Rindal Municipality

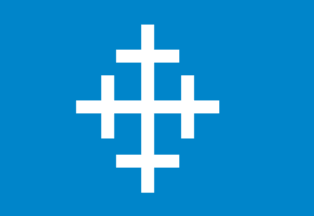
Flag of Røyrvik Municipality

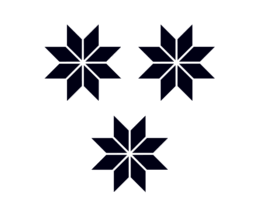
Flag of Selbu Municipality

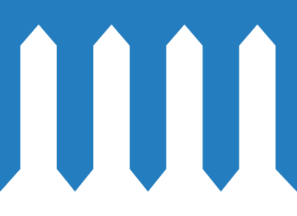
Flag of Skaun Municipality

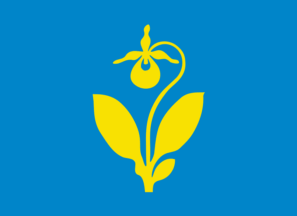
Flag of Snåsa Municipality

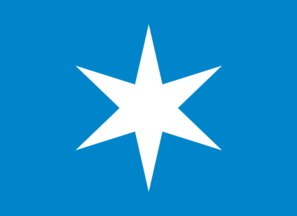
Flag of Steinkjer Municipality

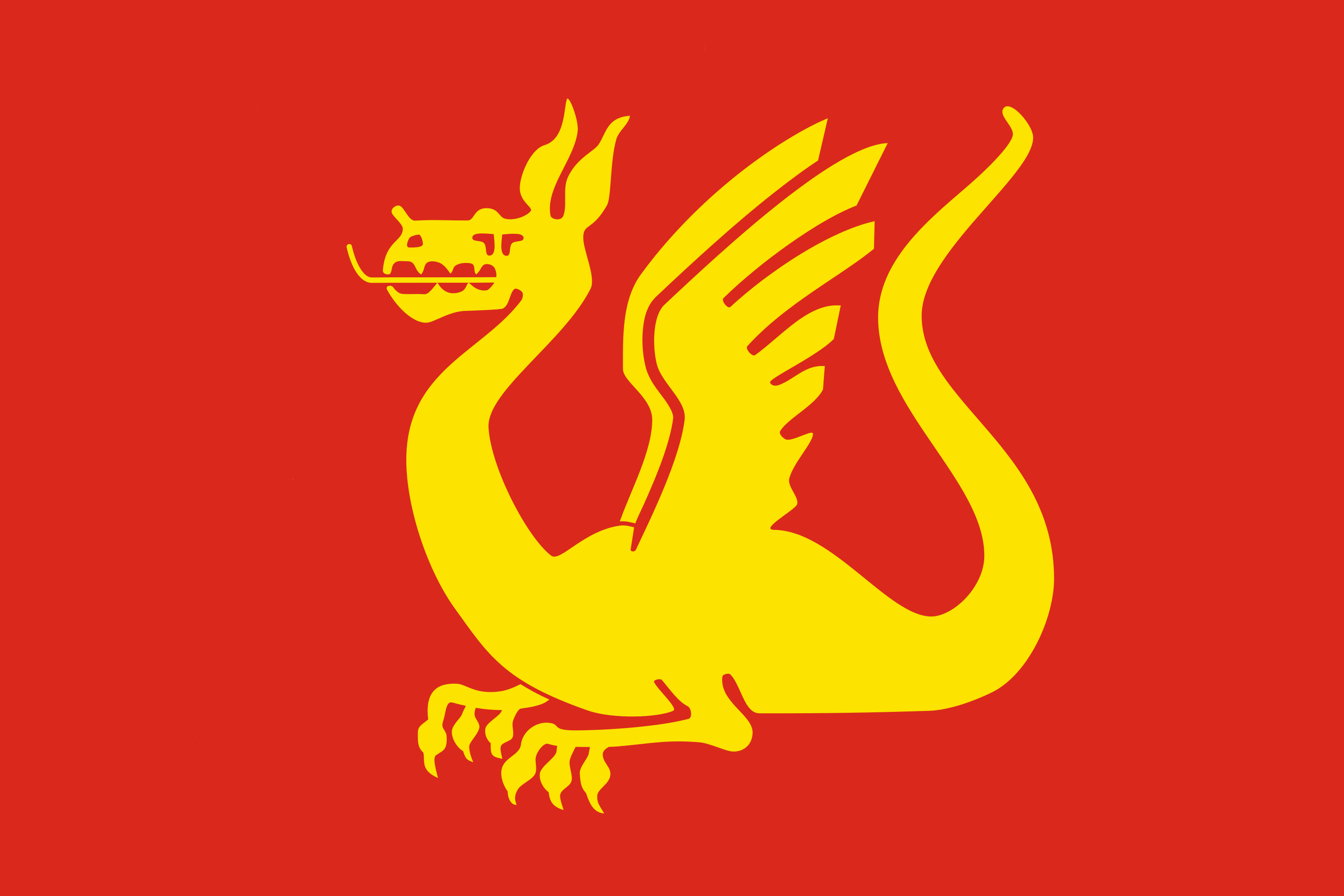
Flag of Stjørdal Municipality

Flag of Trondheim Municipality

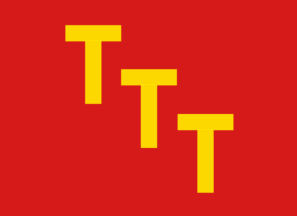
Flag of Tydal Municipality

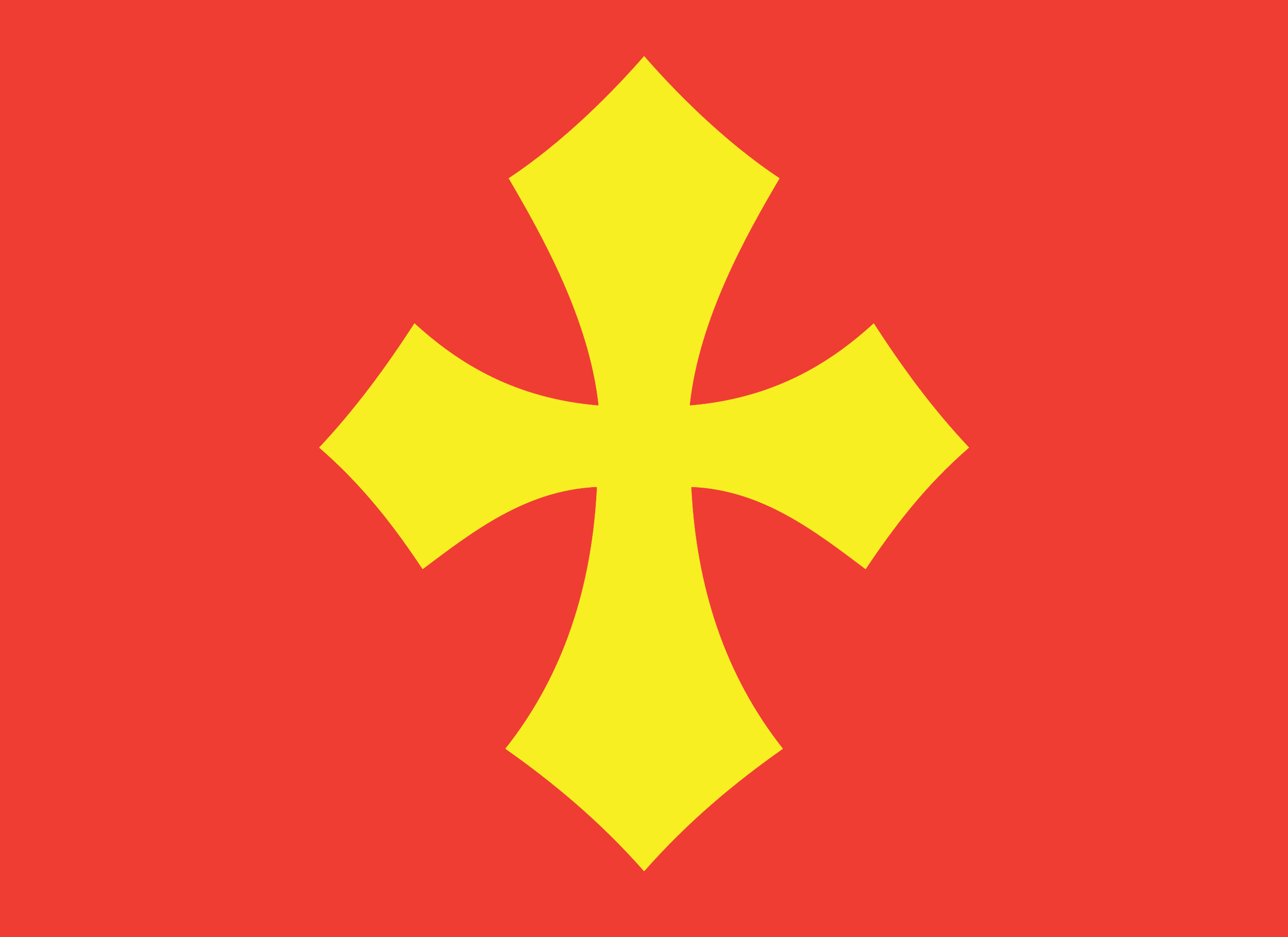
Flag of Verdal Municipality

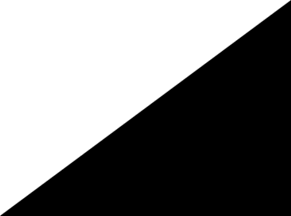
Flag of Ørland Municipality

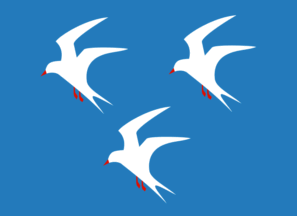
Flag of Åfjord Municipality

=== Vestfold ===
Flags of municipalities in Vestfold county.

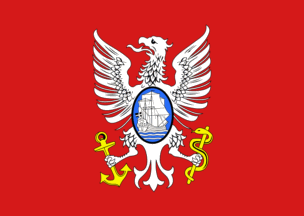
Flag of Holmestrand Municipality

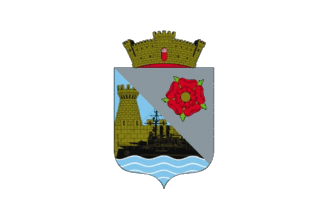
Flag of Horten Municipality

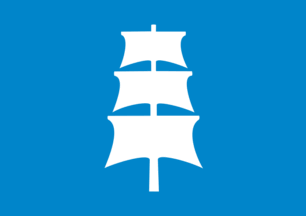
Flag of Larvik Municipality

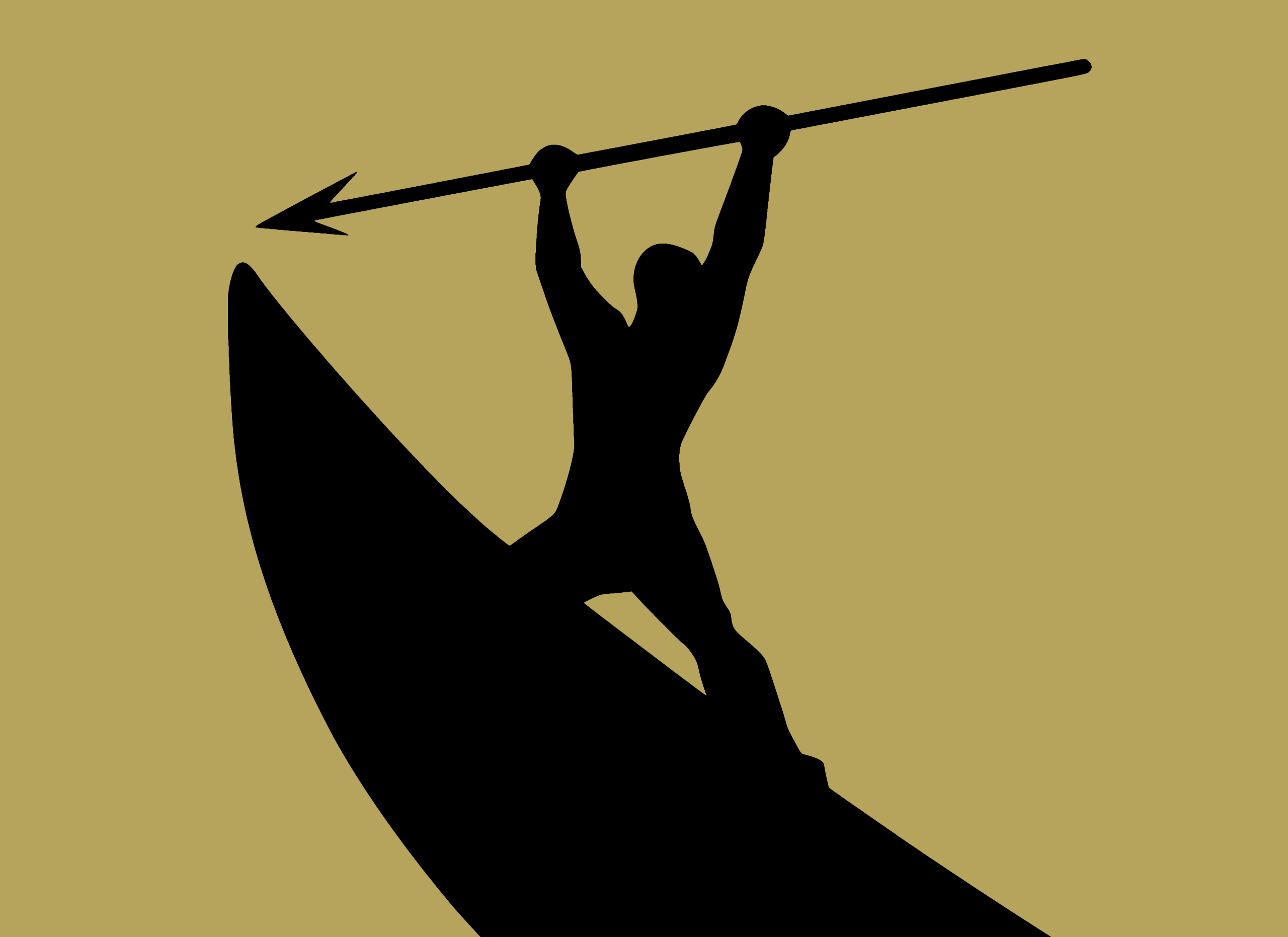
Flag of Sandefjord Municipality

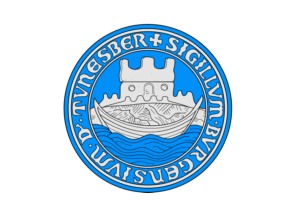
Flag of Tønsberg Municipality

=== Vestland ===
Flags of municipalities in Vestland county.

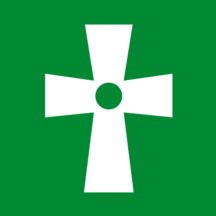
Flag of Askvoll Municipality

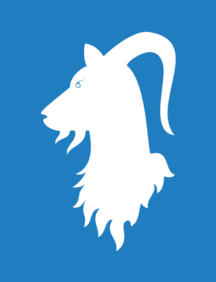
Flag of Aurland Municipality

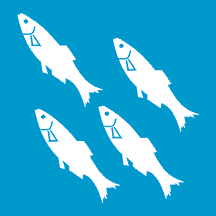
Flag of Austevoll Municipality

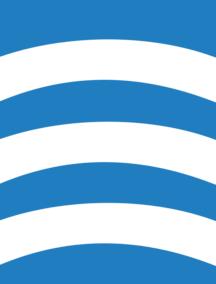
Flag of Austrheim Municipality

Flag of Bergen Municipality

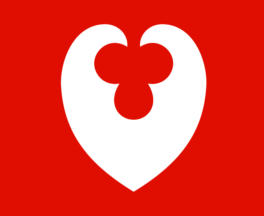
Flag of Bømlo Municipality

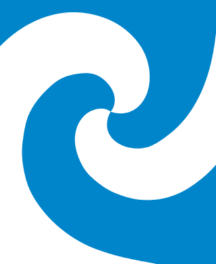
Flag of Bremanger Municipality

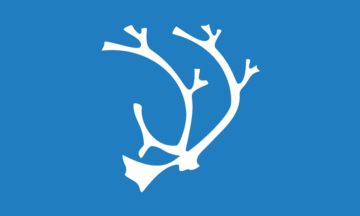
Flag of Eidfjord Municipality

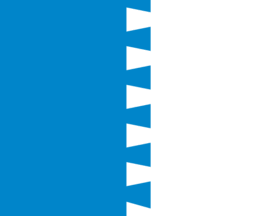
Flag of Etne Municipality

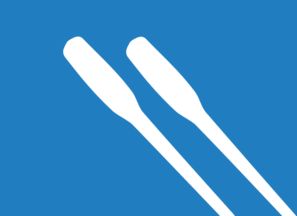
Flag of Fedje Municipality

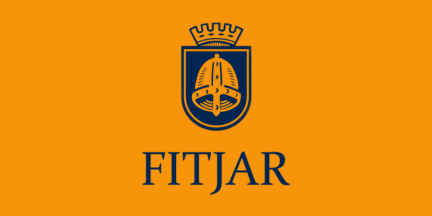
Flag of Fitjar Municipality

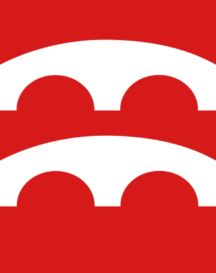
Flag of Fjaler Municipality

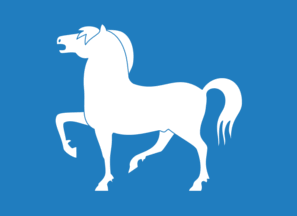
Flag of Gloppen Municipality

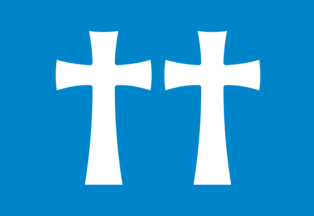
Flag of Gulen Municipality

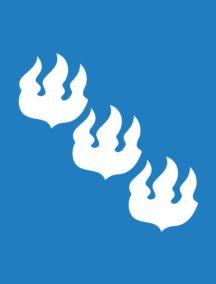
Flag of Høyanger Municipality

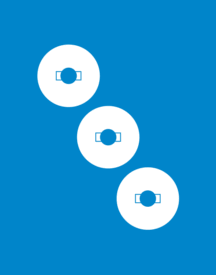
Flag of Hyllestad Municipality

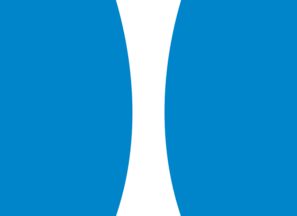
Flag of Kvam Municipality

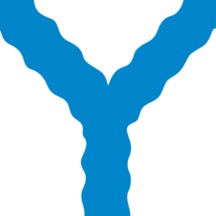
Flag of Kvinnherad Municipality

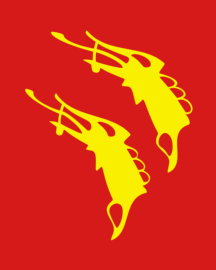
Flag of Lærdal Municipality

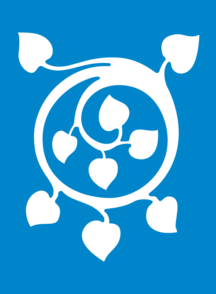
Flag of Luster Municipality

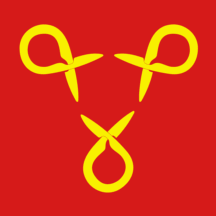
Flag of Masfjorden Municipality

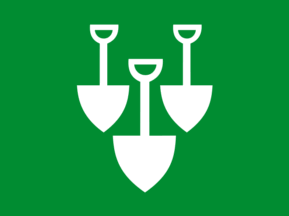
Flag of Modalen Municipality

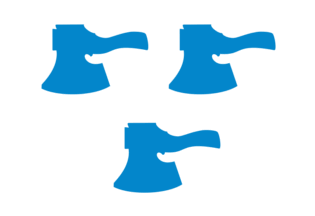
Flag of Osterøy Municipality

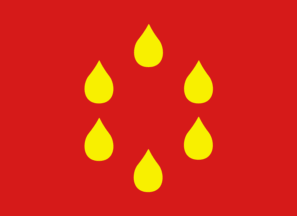
Flag of Samnanger Municipality

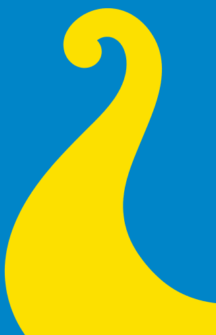
Former flag of Sogndal Municipality

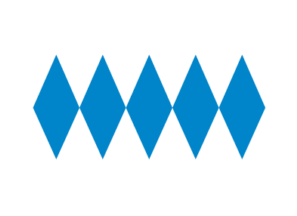
Flag of Solund Municipality

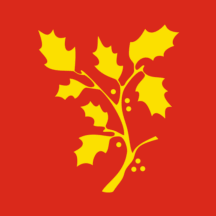
Flag of Stord Municipality

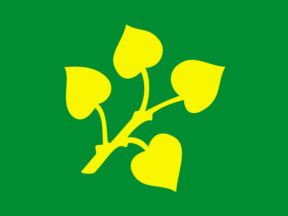
Flag of Stryn Municipality

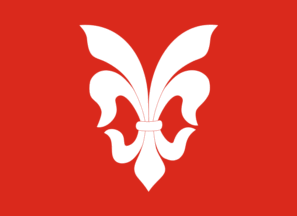
Flag of Sveio Municipality

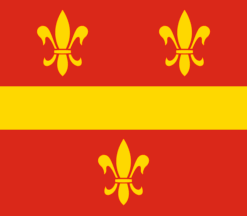
Flag of Ullensvang Municipality

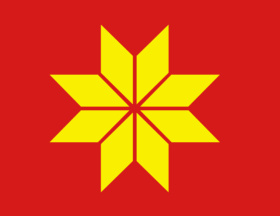
Flag of Ulvik Municipality

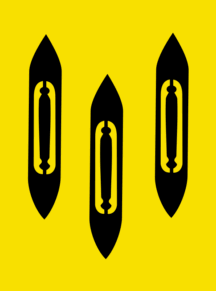
Flag of Vaksdal Municipality

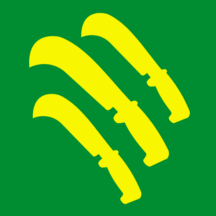
Flag of Vik Municipality

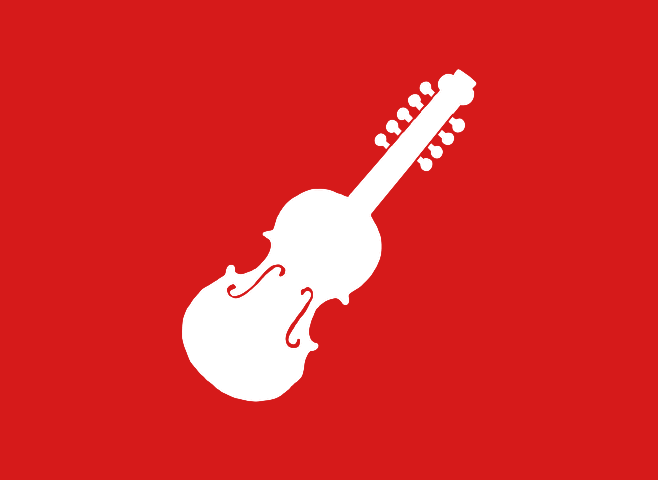
Flag of Voss Municipality

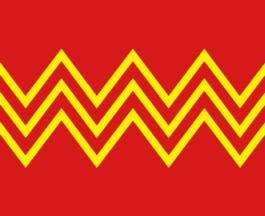
Flag of Årdal Municipality

=== Østfold ===
Flags of municipalities in Østfold county.

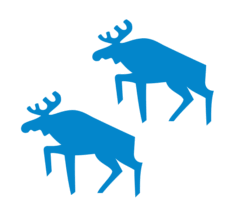
Flag of Aremark Municipality

Flag of Fredrikstad Municipality

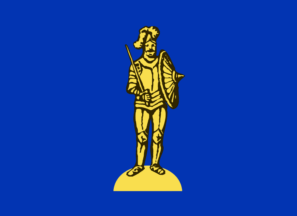
Flag of Halden Municipality

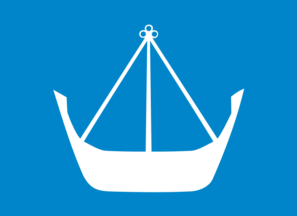
Flag of Hvaler Municipality

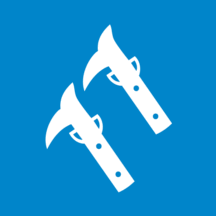
Flag of Marker Municipality

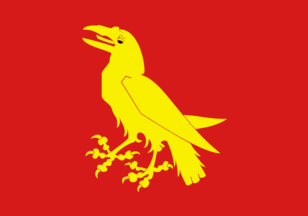
Flag of Moss Municipality

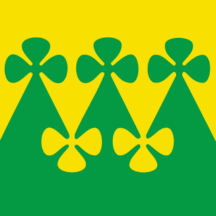
Flag of Rakkestad Municipality

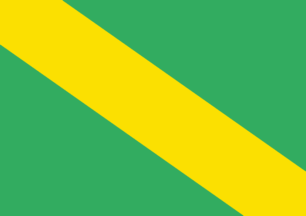
Flag of Råde Municipality

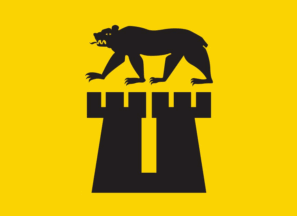
Flag of Sarpsborg Municipality

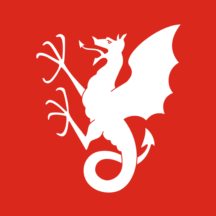
Flag of Skiptvet Municipality

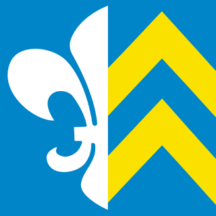
Flag of Våler Municipality

== Ethnic group flags ==
Flag	Duration	Use	Description
	15 August 1986 – present	Flag of the Sámi	The Sami flag is also commonly flown in pennant form. The colors of the Sámi flag are based on traditional Sámi costume, these colors are considered the Sámis (national) colors. The circular motif is derived from a sun/moon symbol which appears on many shaman's drums.
	1962 – 15 August 1986	Flag of the Sámi	Unofficial. Today associated with the Alta controversy.
	2007–present	Flag of the Kven people	The flag was designed by the Swedish artist Bengt Johansson-Kÿrö. The flag shows a sun-rose, which is a common motif found on objects in Kvenland.
	29 December 2022 – present	Flag of the Forest Finns	Designed by the Norwegian couple Frédéric M. Lindboe and Bettina Gullhage. The flag depicts a traditional fertility symbol on a Nordic cross design.
	1978–present	Flag of the Forest Finns	Unofficial. Flag of the Republic of Finnskogen (Republikken Finnskogen). Republikken Finnskogen is a pseudo state which comprises the area known as Finnskogen in Solør, Norway and Värmland, Sweden. The Republic is established annually for 3 days in Svullrya, Norway in commemoration of the Skogfinndagene (Forest Finn days) cultural event.
	1978–present	Flag of the Romani people	The Norwegian Roma and the Romani/Tater people are both officially recognised as separate national minorities in Norway. They share the same flag. The flag was adopted by representatives of various Romani communities at the first and second World Romani Congresses (WRC), in 1971 and 1978. It consists of a blue and green background, representing the heavens and earth, respectively, and a red 16-spoke dharmachakra (cartwheel) in the centre. The latter element represents the itinerant tradition of the Romani people and also pays homage to the flag of India. It was added to the flag by scholar Weer Rajendra Rishi.

== Proposed flags of Norway ==
=== 1814 proposals ===
Flag	Date	Proposed by	Description	Influence
	1814	Christian Frederick	Alternative flag proposal meant to visually contrast against the Danish and Swedish flags. The colors are said to have represented the green spruce forests and grey mountains of Norway.	
	1814	Carl Johan		
	October 1814	Anonymous	Sketch 1	
	October 1814	Anonymous	Sketch 2	
	October 1814	Anonymous	Sketch 3	
	October 1814	Anonymous	Sketch 4	
	October 1814	Anonymous	Sketch 5	
	October 1814	Anonymous	Sketch 6	
	October 1814	Anonymous	Sketch 7	
	October 1814	Anonymous	Sketch 8	
	October 1814	Anonymous	Sketch 9	
	October 1814	Anonymous	Sketch 10	
	October 1814	Anonymous	Sketch 11	
	October 1814	Anonymous	Sketch 12	
	October 1814	Anonymous	Sketch 13	
	October 1814	Anonymous	Sketch 14	
	October 1814	Anonymous	Sketch 15	
	October 1814	Anonymous	Sketch 16	
	October 1814	Anonymous	Sketch 17	
	October 1814	Anonymous	Sketch 18	
	October 1814	Anonymous	Sketch 19	
	October 1814	Anonymous	Sketch 20	
	October 1814	Anonymous	Sketch 21	
	October 1814	Anonymous	Sketch 22	
	October 1814	Anonymous	Sketch 23	
	October 1814	Anonymous	Sketch 24	
	20 October 1814	Gregers Lundh	Proposal 1 by captain Lundh.	
	20 October 1814	Gregers Lundh	Proposal 2 by captain Lundh.	
	November 1814	Svend Busch Brun		

=== 1815 proposals ===
Flag	Date	Proposed by	Description	Influence
	17 August 1815	Peder Jacobsen Bøgvald		
	16 October 1815	Niels Aall		
	16 October 1815	Flag committee of the Storting	Likely inspired the merchant flag used between 1818 and 1844.	

=== 1820 proposals ===
Flag	Date	Proposed by	Description	Influence
	1820	Gabriel Schanche Kielland	In 1820, Storting representative Gabriel Schanche Kielland started a signature campaign in order to adopt a new Norwegian merchant flag, in accordance with his interests as a merchant and ship owner in Stavanger. He also put forth his own design proposal alongside the signature campaign.	

=== 1821 proposals ===
In 1821, a flag committee was deducted in the Storting to find a new merchant flag of Norway. 18 Proposals were put forward to be judged by the committee. On May 4, The Storting discussed and held the vote on what would become the Norwegian flag.

The original documents of 14 of the 18 flag proposals are stored in the Storting Archive. Proposal 4, 5, 9, and 17 are missing.

Flag	Date	Proposed by	Description	Influence
	March 1821	Jan Rasmussen Sande	Proposed by ship captain and Storting representative Jan Rasmussen Sande from Jarlsberg. The flag was based on Christian Frederick's alternative flag proposal from 1814, although Sande's proposal had a white cross instead of the grey cross. This flag was not put forth by the flag committee before the Storting in May.	
Proposals chosen by the Storting flag committee
	May 1821	Flag committee of the Storting	Proposal 1 Based on Proposal 12 from Grimstad, the additions of the lion and stars or crosses were added by the flag committee. The five stars or crosses represented the five dioceses of Akershus, Bergenhus, Christiansand, Trondhjem and Tromsø. Proposal 1 was the flag originally preferred by the flag committee, although it received no votes by the Storting.	
	May 1821	Fredrik Meltzer	Proposal 2	
	May 1821	Fredrik Meltzer	Proposal 3 (Chosen); Proposal 3 by Fredrik Meltzer won on the Storting with 40 votes out of 59 and was thus chosen.	
	May 1821	Unknown	Proposal 6	
	May 1821	Unknown	Proposal 7	
	May 1821	Christian Magnus Falsen	Proposal 8	
	May 1821	Unknown	Proposal 10	
	May 1821	Commission of Bergen	Proposal 11 (A)	
	May 1821	Commission of Bergen	Proposal 11 (B)	
	May 1821	Commission of Bergen	Proposal 11 (C)	
	May 1821	Citizens in Grimstad	Proposal 12; Based on Kielland's 1820 proposal, using red instead of blue.	
	May 1821	Poul Holst	Proposal 13	
	May 1821	Andreas Martin Seip	Proposal 14	
	May 1821	Christian Magnus Falsen	Proposal 15	
	May 1821	Citizens in Tønsberg	Proposal 16	
	May 1821	Unknown	Proposal 18	

=== 1836 union flag proposals ===
Flag	Date	Proposed by	Description
	7 April 1836	Jonas Anton Hielm	Proposed union mark of Sweden-Norway.
	7 April 1836	Jonas Anton Hielm	Proposed merchant and state flags of Norway with union mark.
	7 April 1836	Jonas Anton Hielm	Proposed merchant and state flags of Sweden with union mark.
	2 May 1836	Peter Petersen	Proposed union naval ensigns for Sweden-Norway by minister of mining (Bergråd) Peter Petersen, who was Storting representative of Jarlsberg and Larvik.
	2 May 1836	Peter Petersen	Proposed state flag and customs flag of Norway.

=== Contemporary proposals ===
Flag	Date	Proposed by	Description
	2014	Ådne Løvstad	Secular proposal for a Norwegian national flag designed by artist Ådne Løvstad from Biri, Norway, they were displayed for a limited time in downtown Lillehammer for the occasion of an art display. The flags contain a diagonal cross which represents crossroads, as a place where people gather and meet.

=== Dependent territory proposals ===
Flag	Date	Proposed for	Proposed by	Description
	1930	Flag for Svalbard	Norwegian Agrarian Association	Norwegian lion on heraldic Vair fur pattern.

== See also ==
- Norwegian heraldry
- Coat of arms of Norway
- Ja, vi elsker dette landet
- Kongesangen
- History of Norway
