= Flag flying days in Norway =

National (and merchant) flag of Norway

State flag of Norway

Sami flag

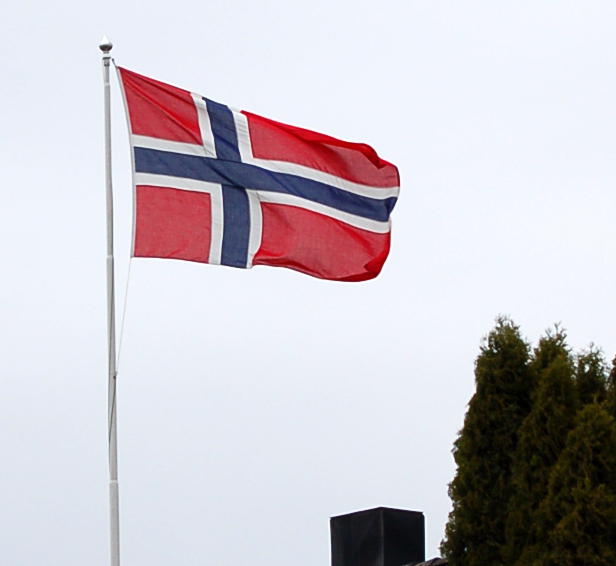
Norwegian flag flying at full staff

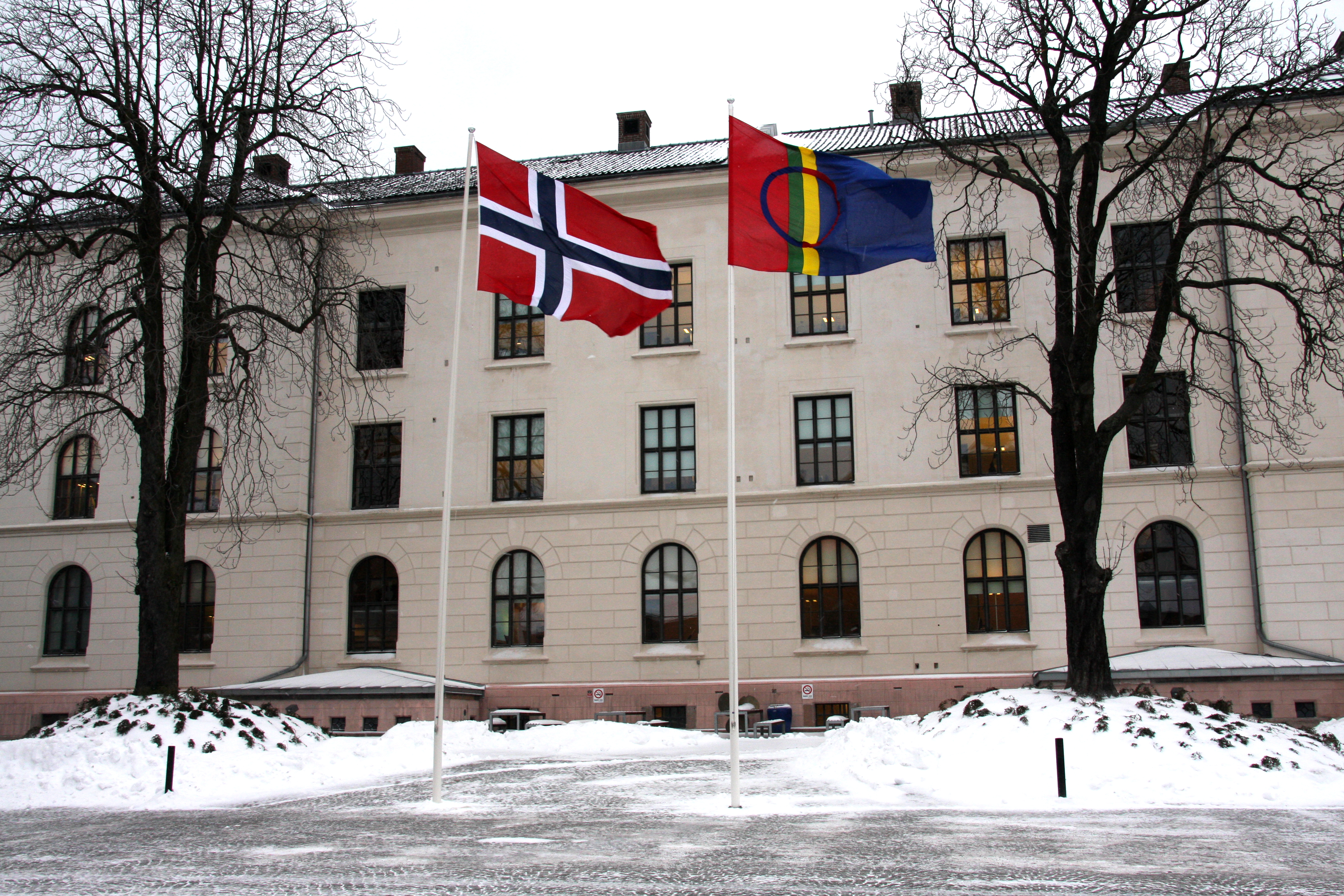
Sami and Norwegian flags flying at Akershus Fortress

Dates when the Norwegian state flag is flown by all branches of government and state agencies are listed in Article 4 of the regulations concerning the use of the state flag and the merchant flag, as modified by Royal Resolution of 3 December 2004. Civilians are also encouraged to display the national flag on these flag-flying days. The flag is flown on the birthday of a member of the Norwegian Royal House, on some Christian holidays and on the dates of significant events of Norwegian history.

On the Day of the Sami people, both state institutions and civilians are encouraged, but not required, to fly the Sami flag in addition to the Norwegian flag.

== Full staff ==
The Norwegian flag is flown at full staff on the following days:

Date	English name	Local name
1 January	New Year's Day (since 2005)	Nyttårsdag
21 January	Birthday of Ingrid Alexandra (since 2004)	H.K.H. prinsesse Ingrid Alexandras fødselsdag
6 February	Day of the Sami people (since 2004)	Samefolkets dag
21 February	Birthday of King Harald V (since 1937)	H.M. kong Harald Vs fødselsdag
1 May	Labour Day (since 1935)	Offentlig høytidsdag
8 May	Liberation Day (liberation from the German occupation of Norway, 1945) (since 1962)	Frigjøringsdagen 1945
17 May	Constitution Day (1814) National Day of Norway (since 1947)	Grunnlovsdagen
7 June	Union Dissolution Day (end of the Swedish-Norwegian Union, 1905)	Unionsoppløsningen 1905
4 July	Birthday of Queen Sonja (since 1968)	H.M. dronning Sonjas fødselsdag
20 July	Birthday of Crown Prince Haakon Magnus (since 1973)	H.K.H. kronprins Haakon Magnus' fødselsdag
29 July	Olsok (Day of Saint Olaf, king and patron saint of Norway) (since 1928)	Olsokdagen
19 August	Birthday of Crown Princess Mette-Marit (since 2001)	H.K.H. kronprinsesse Mette-Marits fødselsdag
25 December	Christmas (since 2005)	Juledag
Movable	Easter (since 2005)	Påskedag
Movable	Pentecost Day (since 2005)	Pinsedag
Movable	Parliamentary election day (since 1936)	Dagen for stortingsvalg

== Half-staff ==
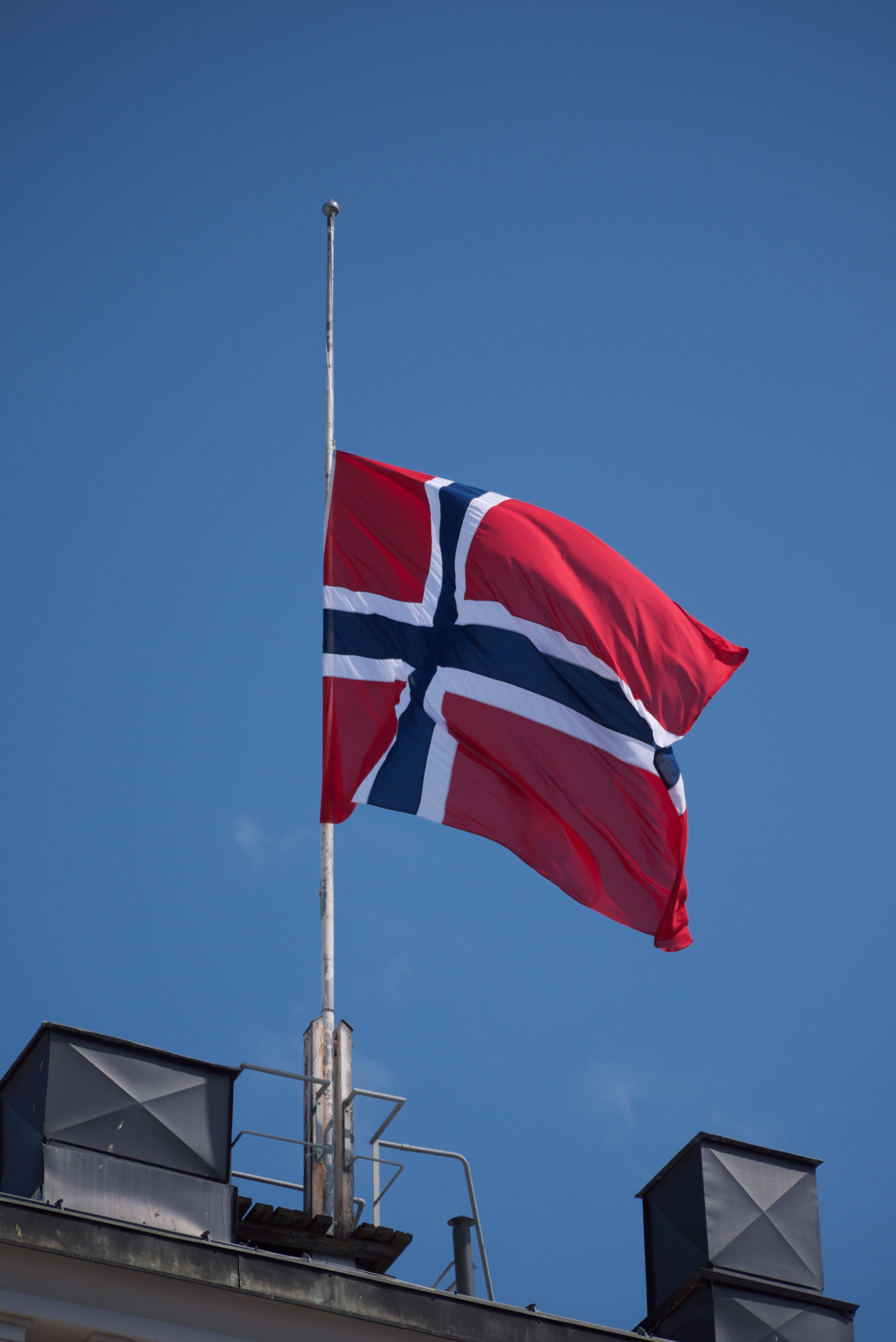
Norwegian flag at half-staff to mourn the victims of the 2011 Norway attacks

On days designated as official days of mourning the state flag is to be flown at half-staff by state and government agencies. There are no permanent days of mourning, and this provision only comes into use upon the death of a member of the Royal House or as designated by the government. Upon the death of a member of the Royal House the flag is to be displayed at half-staff each day from the announcement of death until the end of the burial service. If the burial service of a non-royal person connected to an individual public institution occurs on a flag flying day, the flag flown by that institution is lowered to half-staff until the burial service is over. One such example of a designated official day of mourning was during the immediate aftermath of the 2011 Norway attacks, on which flags throughout Norway were flown at half-staff as a symbol of mourning for the victims.

== Former flag days ==
The flag is flown only for living members of the Royal House. When a member of the Royal family dies or leaves the Royal House, their birthday ceases to be a flag flying day. The Royal House is defined as consisting of the Monarch, those directly in line of succession and their spouses. The three living princesses have left the Royal House as a result of their marriages.

Date	Occasion
2 July	Birthday of King Olav V from 1905 to 1991
3 August	Birthday of King Haakon VII from 1905 to 1957
26 November	Birthday of Queen Maud from 1905 to 1938
28 March	Birthday of Crown Princess Märtha from 1929 to 1954
9 June	Birthday of Princess Ragnhild from 1931 to 1953
12 February	Birthday of Princess Astrid from 1932 to 1961
22 September	Birthday of Princess Märtha Louise from 1971 to 2004

== See also ==
- Public holidays in Norway
- Flag-flying days in Finland
- Flag-flying days in Sweden
