= Union Dissolution Day =

Norwegian holiday commemorating the dissolution of its union with Sweden (7 June 1905)

- Observed by: Norway
- Significance: 7 June is Norway's Independence Day: remembrance of the Norwegian parliament's 1905 declaration of dissolution of the union with Sweden; remembrance of the 1940 royal escape from Nazi - German invaders to exile; remembrance of the Norwegian royal family's return from five years in exile in 1945
- Celebrations: Flag flying day in Norway
- Date: 7 June
- Next time: 7 June 2026
- Frequency: annual
- Related to: 1905 Dissolution of the union between Norway and Sweden; The Norwegian royal family 1945 Liberation Day (8 May); 1814 Norwegian Constitution; Norwegian Constitution Day (annual: 17 May)

The Union Dissolution Day, observed in Norway on 7 June (though not a public holiday), is marked in remembrance of the Norwegian parliament's 1905 declaration of dissolution of the union with Sweden, a personal union which had existed since 1814. The day is celebrated in Norway as the Independence Day and is an official flag flying day, and is observed with ordinary salute at Akershus Fortress. The Independence Day, however, has few traditions of celebration beyond that.

== Royal return after World War II ==
By historical coincidence, 7 June was also the date in 1940 when King Haakon VII of Norway and the royal family, along with the Norwegian cabinet and parliament, had to leave the country after escaping the German forces during the World War II invasion of Norway; and it is also the date in 1945 on which the King returned after 5 years of exile in London.

== Gallery ==
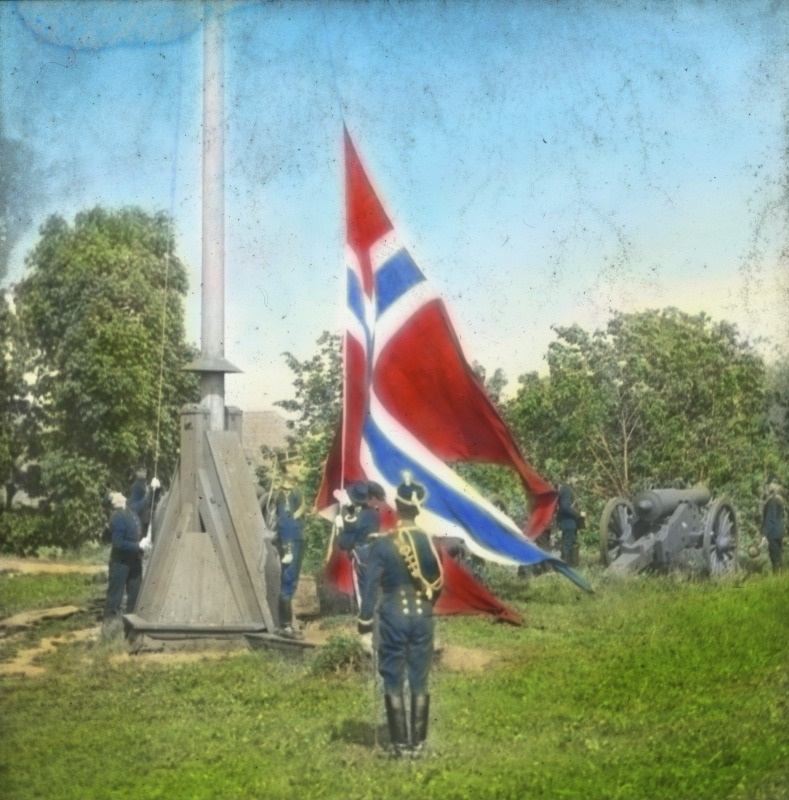
1905: The Norwegian flag, without the union mark, is raised at Akershus Fortress following the dissolution resolution

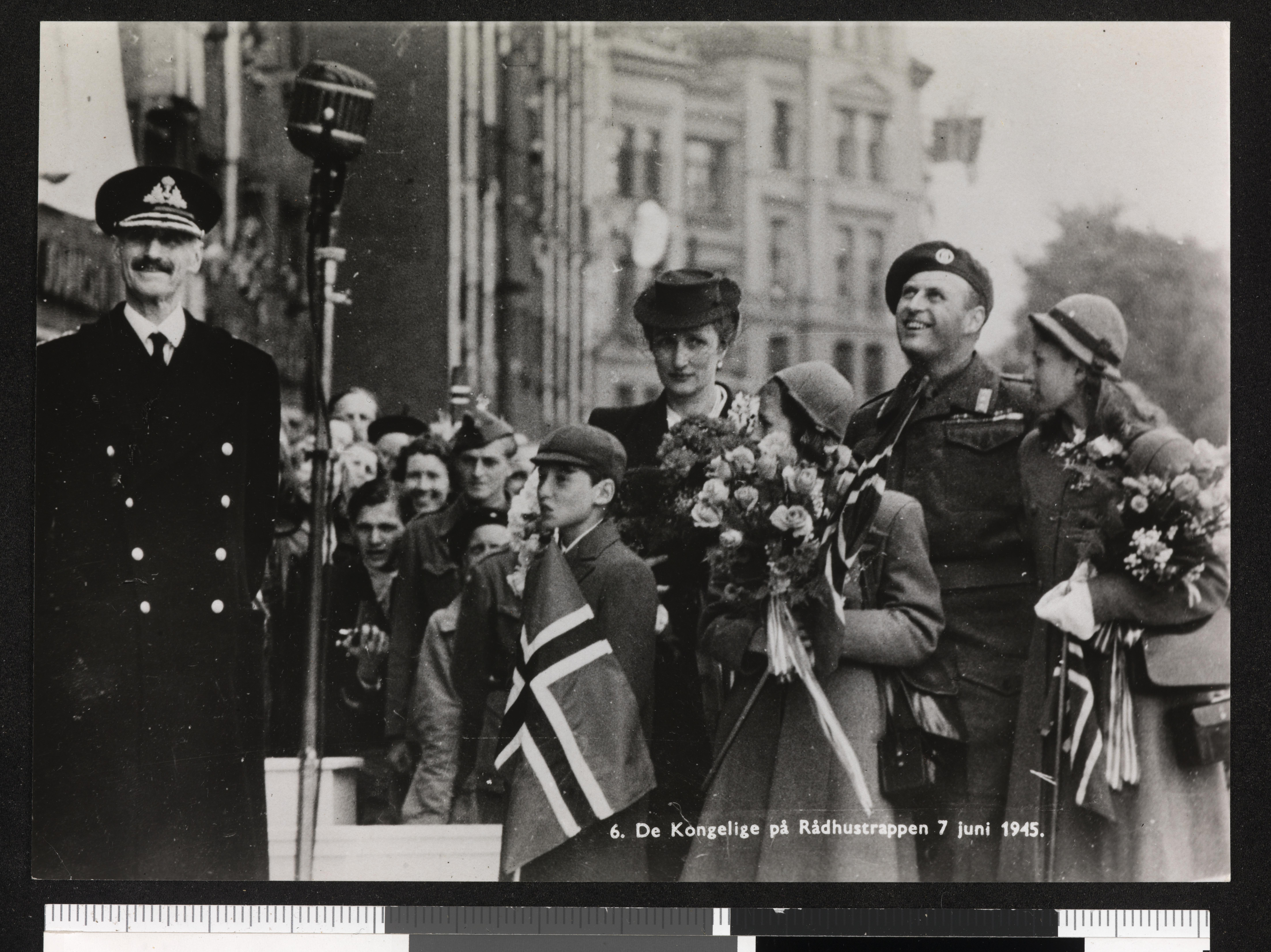
1945: The royal family on June 7, 1945, returned after five years in exile. From left: King Haakon VII, Prince Harald (with flag), Crown Princess Märtha, Princess Astrid, Crown Prince Olav and Princess Ragnhild
