= Flag flying days in Sweden =

By an ordinance issued by the government of Sweden, a number of days of the calendar year are designated as official flag flying days when the Swedish flag is flown on all public flagpoles and buildings. Hoisting of the Swedish flag on private flagpoles on these days is strongly encouraged but not mandatory.

The Swedish flag

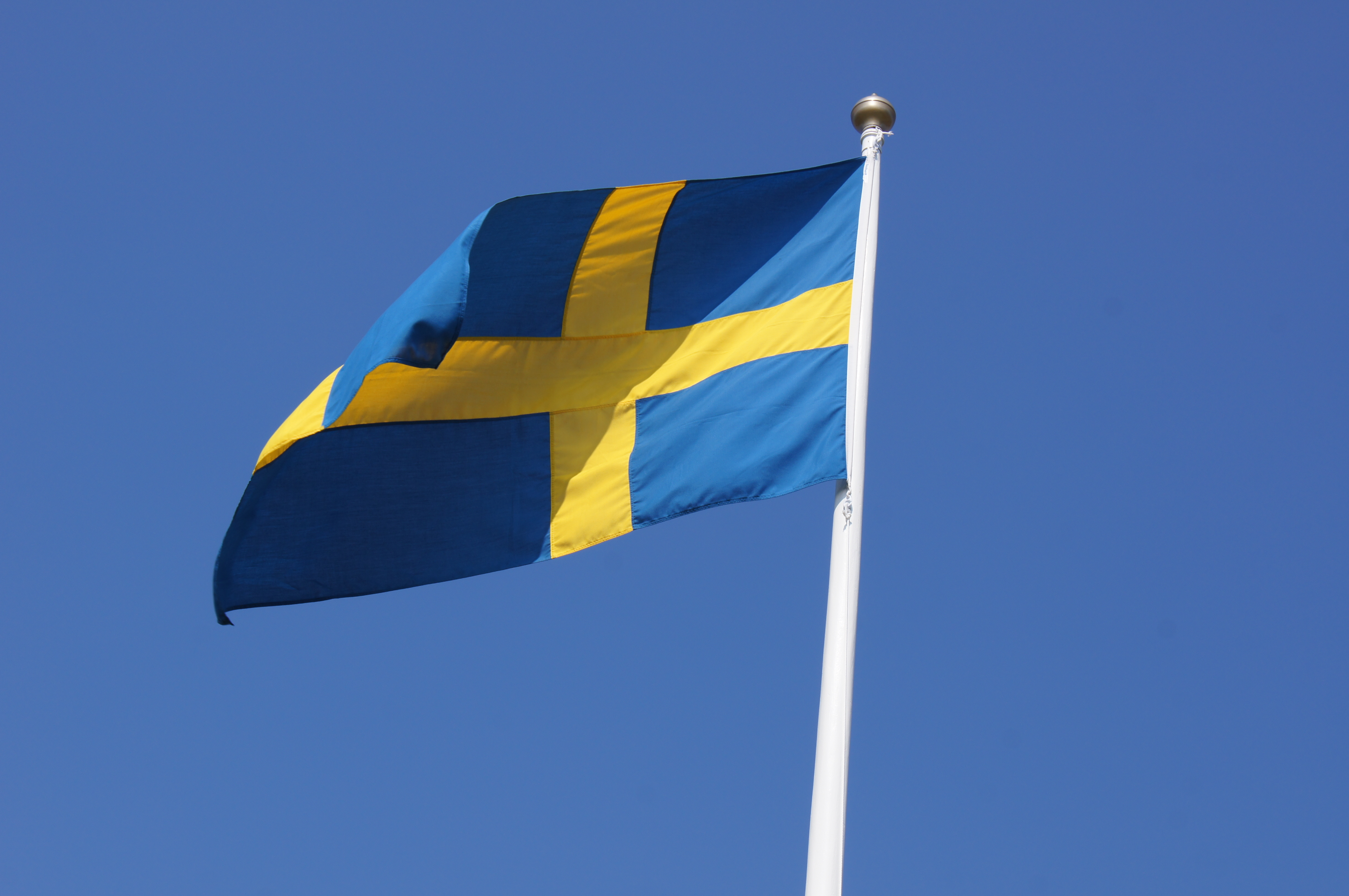
Swedish flag flying from a flagpole

The time of day at which the flag is raised and lowered is generally dictated by the position of the sun, but there are also guidelines specified by military tradition. The flag is hoisted at 08:00 in the summer and 09:00 in the winter, and it is lowered by sunset but never later than 21:00. In parts of Sweden north of the Arctic Circle, the sun does not rise at all for several weeks during winter. For example, in the northern town of Kiruna, the flag is flown from 09:00 until 11:50.

== List of official flag flying days ==
Date	English name	Local name	Remarks
1 January	New Year's Day	Nyårsdagen	
28 January	Name day of the King	Konungens namnsdag	King Carl XVI Gustaf
12 March	Name day of the Crown Princess	Kronprinsessans namnsdag	Crown Princess Victoria
First Sunday after the first full moon on or after 21 March	Easter Sunday	Påskdagen	
30 April	King's Birthday	Konungens födelsedag	King Carl XVI Gustaf
1 May	May Day	Första maj	
29 May	Veterans Day	Veterandagen	
Seventh Sunday after Easter Sunday	Pentecost	Pingstdagen	50 days after Easter
6 June	National Day of Sweden and Flag Day	Sveriges nationaldag, svenska flaggans dag	Flag day since c. 1900, officially observed as national day since 1983, holiday since 2005
Saturday between 20 and 26 June	Midsummer Day	Midsommardagen	
14 July	Victoria Day	Kronprinsessans födelsedag	Crown Princess Victoria
8 August	Name day of the Queen	Drottningens namnsdag	Queen Silvia
Second Sunday of September during election years	Election Day	Dag för val i hela riket till riksdagen	Elections held every four years
24 October	United Nations Day	FN-dagen	
6 November	Gustavus Adolphus Day	Gustav Adolfsdagen	Battle of Lützen (1632)
10 December	Alfred Nobel Day	Nobeldagen	The Nobel awards ceremony
23 December	Queen's Birthday	Drottningens födelsedag	Queen Silvia
25 December	Christmas Day	Juldagen	

== See also ==
- Flag flying day
- Public holidays in Sweden
- Swedish festivities
- Name days in Sweden
- Du gamla, du fria
- Flag flying days in Finland
- Flag flying days in Norway
