= Mikael Agricola Day =

Flag-flying day in Finland

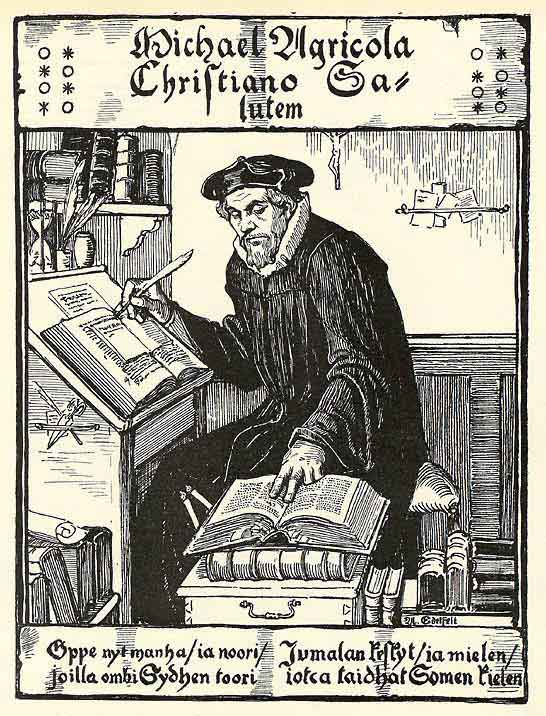
Mikael Agricola as drawn by Albert Edelfelt

Mikael Agricola Day (Finnish: Mikael Agricolan päivä, Swedish: Mikael Agricoladagen) is celebrated in Finland on April 9th in honor of a Finnish Lutheran clergyman Mikael Agricola (c. 1510–1557). Since 1978, the day is also celebrated in Finland as the Day of Finnish Language (Finnish: Suomen kielen päivä, Swedish: finska språkets dag), of which Agricola is known as the "father of literary Finnish"; Agricola created the written Finnish language by, among other things, writing the Abckiria (1543) and translating the New Testament (Se Wsi Testamenti, 1548).

Departing from tradition, the day is observed on the anniversary of Mikael Agricola's death, even though flags are usually flown in a person's honor on their birthday; this is because Agricola's exact date of birth is unknown. Mikael Agricola Day was officially added to the Finnish calendar in 1960. April 9th is also the birthday of Elias Lönnrot, who compiled the The Kalevala, Finland's national epic.

In honor of Agricola, the Agricola pastry was developed and unveiled on Agricola Day in 2014. The competition to design the pastry was organized by the Finnish Bible Society.

== See also ==
- Flag flying days in Finland
