= Solliden Palace =

Palace in Borgholm Municipality, Sweden

Coordinates: 56°51′55″N 16°38′06″E

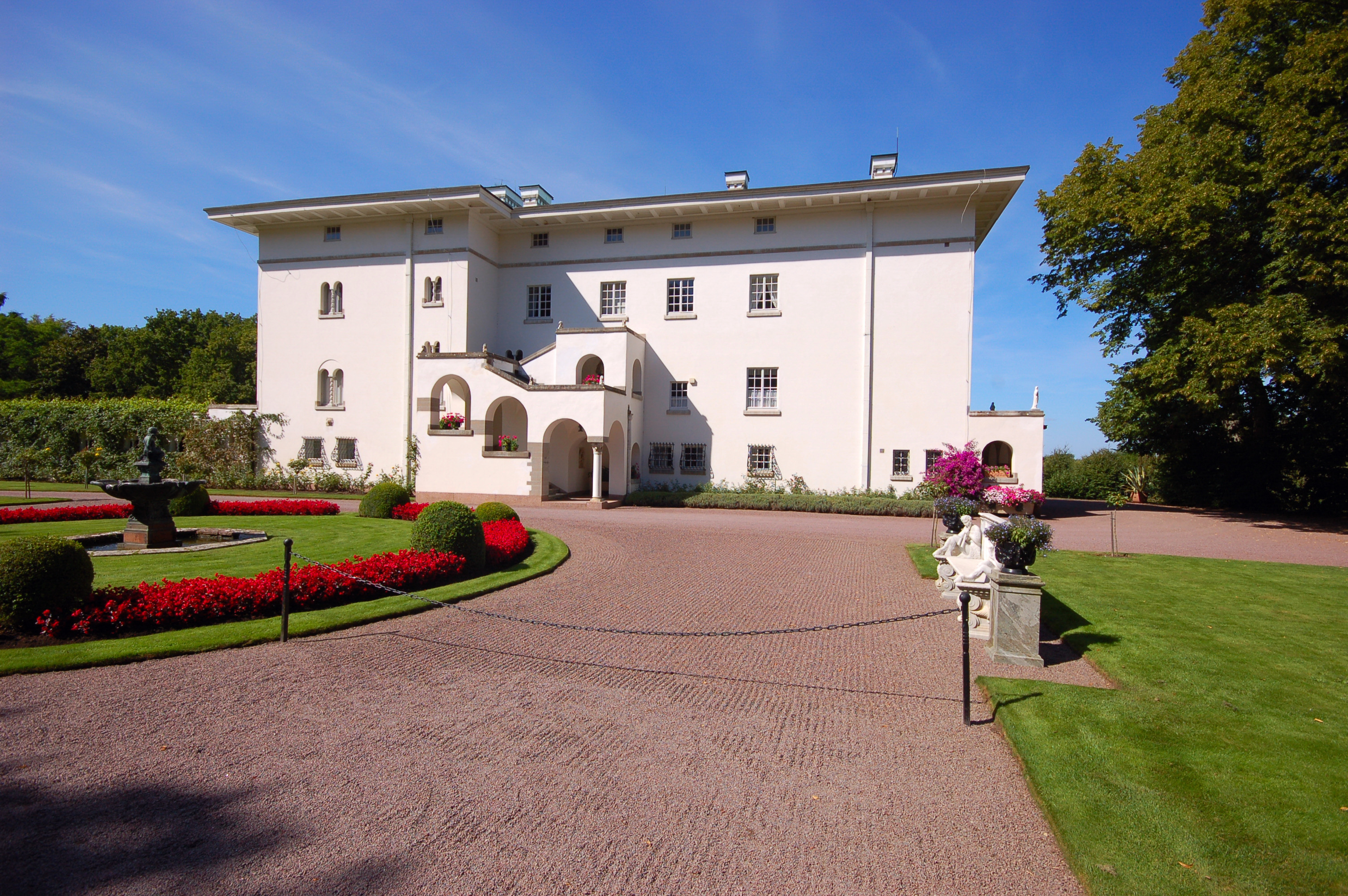
Solliden Palace on Öland in 2015

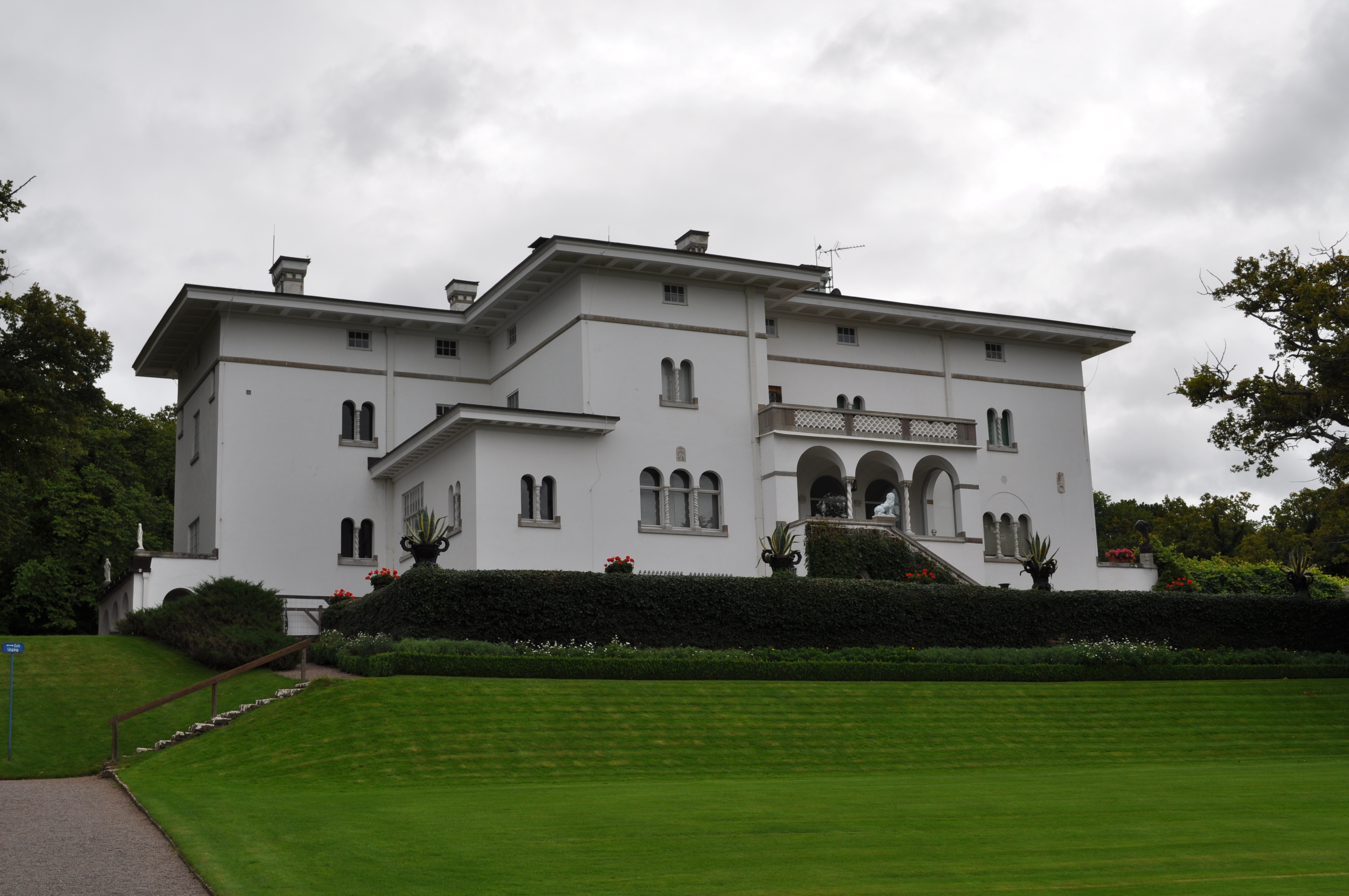
Solliden Palace viewed from the west

Solliden Palace (Swedish: Sollidens Slott) – commonly referred to simply as Solliden – is the summer residence of the Swedish Royal Family and is privately owned by King Carl XVI Gustaf. The palace is situated near the ruins of Borgholm Castle on the island of Öland in southern Sweden, overlooking the Baltic Sea.

== History ==
Solliden was commissioned by the then Crown Princess Victoria, who acquired an area of land near Borgholm Castle in 1903. Victoria suffered from poor health and found that the comparatively dry climate of Öland provided relief from her ailments.

The palace was designed by Swedish architect Torben Grut as an Italian-inspired stone villa. Victoria took an active role in the project and drew particular inspiration from Villa San Michele on Capri, the home of Swedish physician and author Axel Munthe. With Munthe's assistance, architectural details and statues were acquired in Italy and incorporated into the building. The foundation stone was laid on 25 September 1903 and Victoria moved into the completed residence on 15 September 1906.

Following Victoria's death in 1930, Solliden passed to her husband, King Gustaf V. During his ownership the palace park was opened to the public. Gustaf V subsequently bequeathed Solliden to his great-grandson, the future King Carl XVI Gustaf, who inherited the estate upon Gustaf V's death in 1950.

== Royal use ==
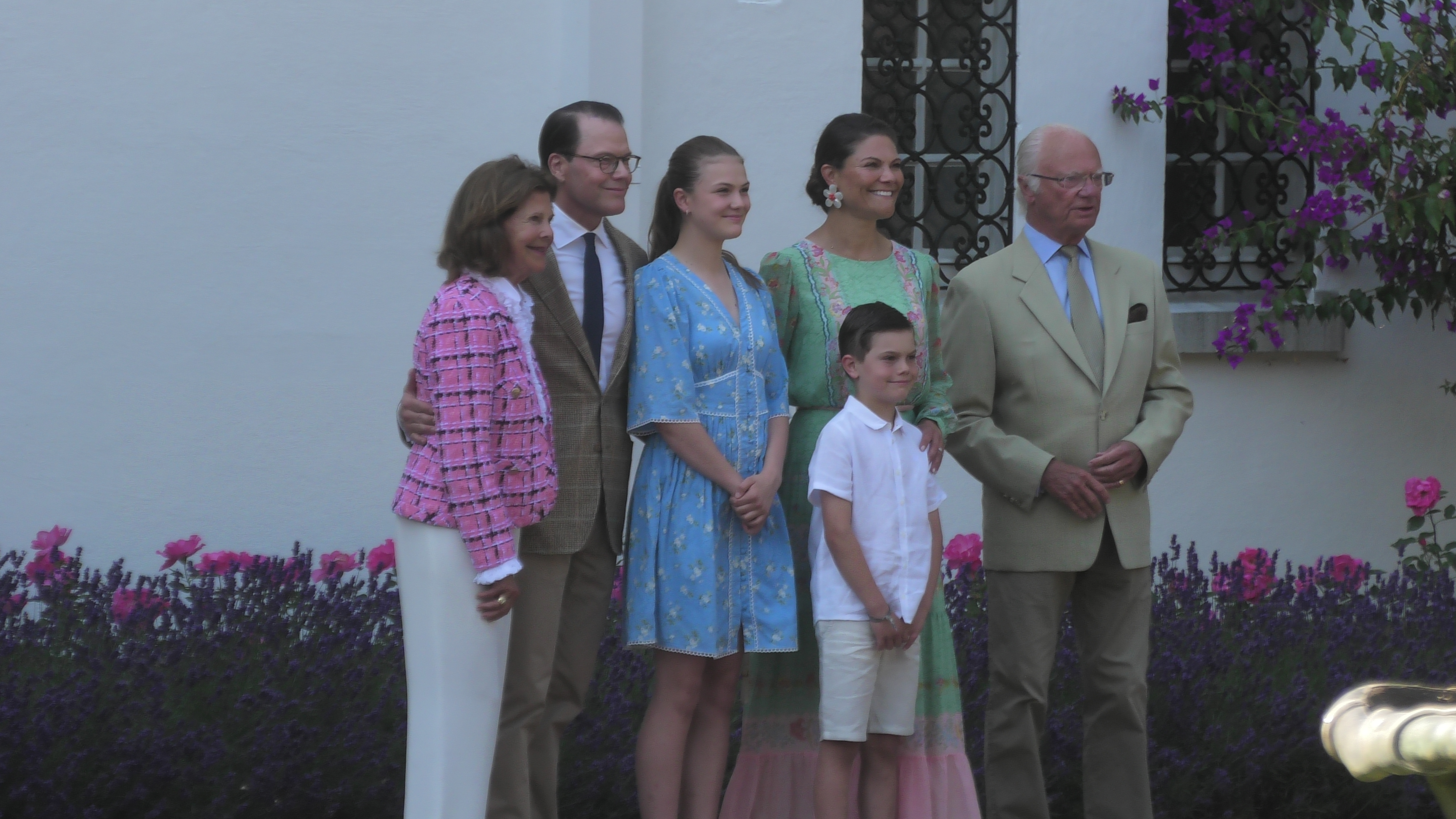
The Swedish royal family at Solliden during Victoriadagen in 2025

Solliden continues to serve as the summer residence of the Swedish Royal Family, with the King and Queen Silvia spending much of the summer there together with other members of the family. The palace also hosts part of the annual celebrations for the birthday of Crown Princess Victoria, known as Victoriadagen, on 14 July, when members of the Royal Family traditionally meet the public in front of the palace before celebrations continue in Borgholm.
