= Minna Canth Day =

Flag-flying day in Finland

Minna Canth Day (Finnish: Minna Canthin päivä, Swedish: Minna Canth-dagen) is celebrated in Finland on March 19th in honor of the writer Minna Canth, who was born on this day in 1844. The day is also celebrated in Finland as the Day of Equality (Finnish: Tasa-arvon päivä, Swedish: Jämställdhetsdagen), which Canth's life's work focused on promoting.

== Minna Canth ==
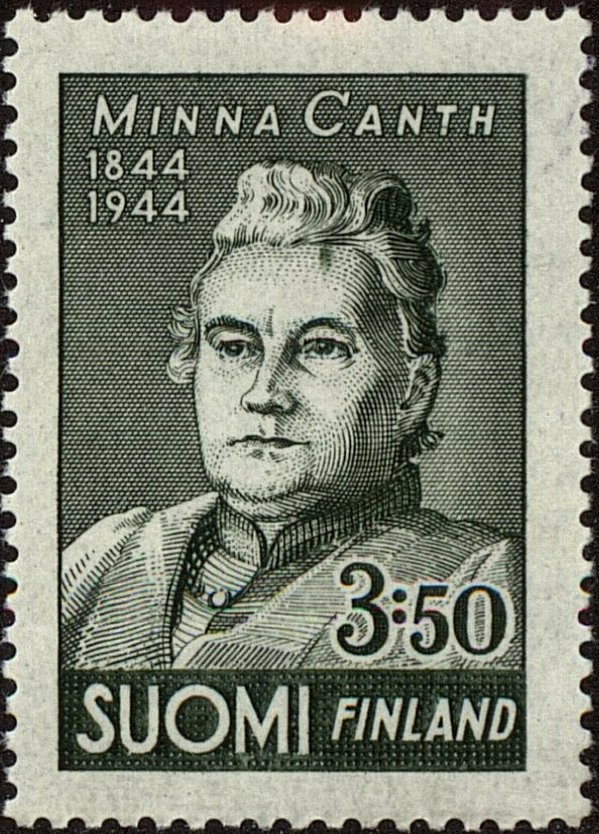
Minna Canth on a stamp issued in 1944

Minna Canth (1844–1897) was a Finnish writer and social activist. Her work addresses issues of women's rights, particularly in the context of a prevailing culture she considered antithetical to permitting expression and realization of women's aspirations. She was the first major Finnish-language playwright and prose writer after Aleksis Kivi and the first Finnish-language newspaper woman.

== Celebrations ==
The Ministry of the Interior ordered state agencies and institutions to fly the flag in 2003 on Minna Canth's birthday and in support of equality. The ministry also recommended general flag-raising. In the early 2000s, the Ministry of the Interior had received several proposals to choose Canth's birthday as a general flag-raising day. The support association of the Kanttila Cultural Centre in Kuopio had proposed that the day should be called Minna Canth and Equality Day.

In 2004, Minna Canth's birthday was marked by a half-mast ceremony due to the Konginkangas bus disaster. Despite the tragic accident, the Ministry of the Interior continued the flag flying recommendation in 2005 and sought to monitor the implementation of the recommendation. The flag flying received positive feedback, which led the Ministry of the Interior to make a proposal to the Almanac Office of the University of Helsinki to mark the day in the calendar as a permanent flag flying day.

The Almanac Office considered Minna Canth Day a fitting day to mark the occasion. The rector of the University of Helsinki signed the decision to add Minna Canth Day as a permanent flag day in the almanac starting in 2007. Minna Canth is the eighth Finnish notable person and the first Finnish woman to have her own flag day.

In Kuopio, where Canth lived, an event called Minna's Days (Minnan päivät) has been organized since 2010 on Minna Canth Day.

== See also ==
- Flag flying days in Finland
