= Torben Grut =

Swedish architect

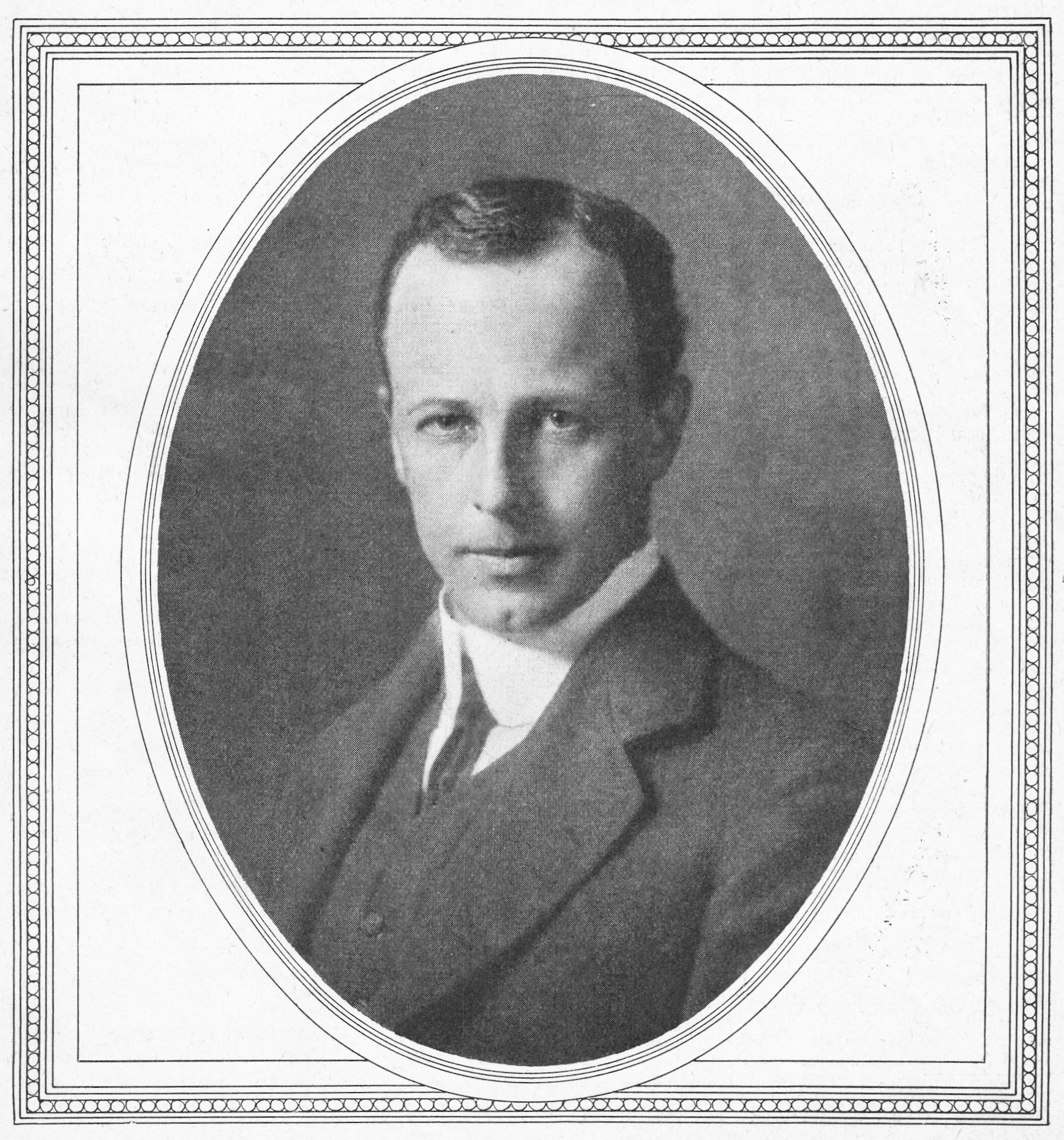
Torben Grut

Torben Grut (2 June 1871 - 24 December 1945) was a Swedish architect.

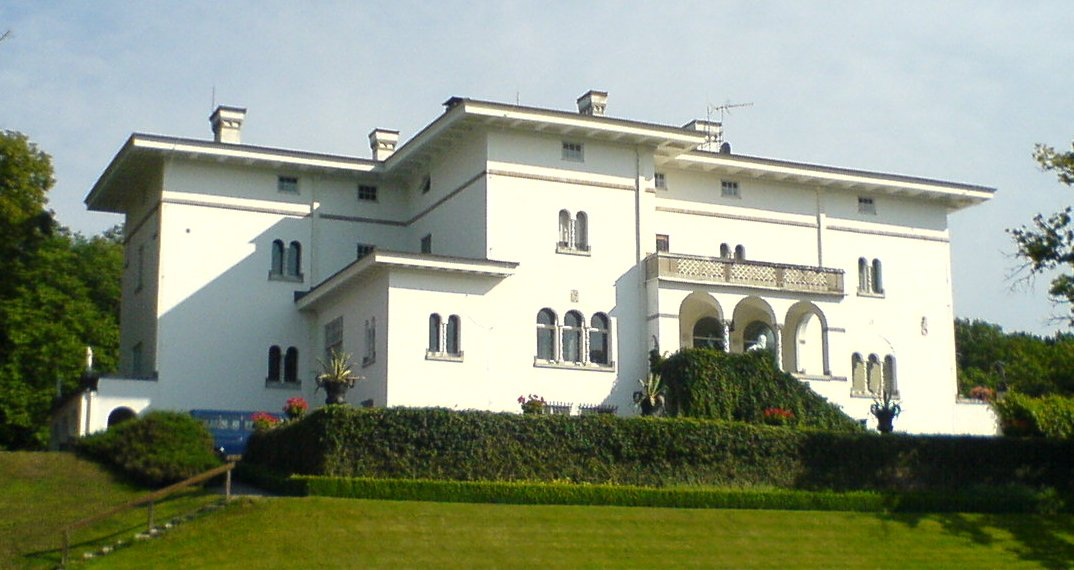
Villa Solliden

== Biography ==
Torben Andreas Grut was born at Tuns parish in Skaraborg County, Sweden. Grut studied at the KTH Royal Institute of Technology in Stockholm. From 1894, Grut was employed by the Danish architect Hans Jørgen Holm. At the same time, he also became a student at the Royal Danish Academy of Fine Arts. From 1893 to 1896, he was associated with Isak Gustaf Clason and from 1898 to 1899 was employed by Ferdinand Boberg.

In 1906, he designed Solliden Palace, the summer residence of the Swedish Royal Family. He designed Stockholm Olympic Stadium in 1912.

Torben was the Swedish champion in tennis 1896-1897 and a member of the Danish IOC 1906-1912. His son William Grut (1914–2012) won the Gold Medal in the modern pentathlon at the 1948 Summer Olympics. Content in this edit is translated from the existing Swedish Wikipedia article at sv:Torben Grut; see its history for attribution.

== Buildings ==
Among his works are Villa Bellro in Mullsjö (1899), the Tennis House in Stockholm's sports park (1900), several villas, including the architect's own Villa Grut on Djurgården in Stockholm (1906), Solliden on Öland (1906), Villa Apelgården for book publisher Wahlström in Storängen in Nacka (1906) and Villa Waern, also in Storängen (1905).Among public buildings, the most famous is Stockholm Stadium (1910–1912), whose ring wall-like structure in brick he managed to implement against an original idea of a temporary wooden structure. Other public buildings include Norrfjärden Church, near Piteå (1909), Ammarnäs Church in Sorsele Municipality (1912), Stengårdshult Church and Belfry in Småland and Berga Castle on Södertörn (1915). The reconstruction of the Swedish embassy in Helsinki in the Ticino Baroque style (1923) was carried out so that the facade resembles the northern facade of Stockholm Palace.

Grut also made drawings for small wooden residential buildings; for example, “building types for small farms” in 1905 commissioned by the Swedish Academy of Agriculture or “Drawing drawings for modern sports cottages and villas” which he published together with Jakob J:son Gate, among others. In the competition for a new city plan for Gothenburg in 1902, Grut, together with engineer Nils Gellerstedt, won second prize.

Selected works

Drawing signature, 1909 Villa Bellro in Mullsjö (1899) Plinth in red granite for the statue of Jonas Alströmer at Lilla Torget, Gothenburg.[6] Villa Grut, Södra Djurgården, Stockholm (1905) Sollidens Castle on Öland (1906) Villa Apelgården, Storängen, Nacka (1906) Tobacco Monopoly in Härnösand (originally Strengbergs Tobacco Factory) (1906–1909) Workers' Housing in Vallvik, Hälsingland (1907–1908) Strengbergs Tobacco Factory (1909) and Fire Station (1912) in Jakobstad[7] Sparbanken in Linköping (1908) Norrfjärdens Church (1909) Piplärkan 8 in Lärkstaden (1909-1910) Ammarnäs Church (1910–1912) Villa Hildasholm, Leksand (1910) Stengårdshults Church (1910) Magleås Manor, Denmark (1910) Stockholm Stadium (1910–1912) Funeral Chapel at the Northern Cemetery in Norrköping (1913) Villa Wallenberg, Solsidan, Saltsjöbaden (1914) Berga Castle, Södertörn (1915) Stjärneborg Castle, Aneby (1915) Sparbankshuset, Umeå (1915)[8] Villa Båge, Solsidan, Saltsjöbaden (1917) Italian Villa, Grimskaftsvägen, Degerhamn (1917) Villa Tobo, Västervik (1917) Standard types for Swedish forester's residences, including Villa Norrbyviken in Borensberg (1921) Djursholm Parish Hall (1920s) Swedish Embassy in Helsinki (reconstruction, 1923)[9] Linghallen, Norrköping (1925) Saltsjöbaden's open-air bath (men's section) on Restaurangholmen, Saltsjöbaden (1925) Gunnarsbyn Church (1928) Avesta Storfors power plant (II-III) (1918 and 1929)[10]
