= Public holidays in Norway =

Public holidays in Norway are regulated by the Norwegian Annual Holiday Act, which was amended in 2014 to include workers employed in the mining and fishing industries, as well as all public and private sectors.

Date	English name	Local name	Notes
1 January	New Year's Day	Første nyttårsdag	
Moveable Thursday	Maundy Thursday	Skjærtorsdag	The Thursday before Easter Sunday
Moveable Friday	Good Friday	Langfredag	The Friday before Easter Sunday
Moveable Sunday	Easter Sunday	Første påskedag	
Moveable Monday	Easter Monday	Andre påskedag	The day after Easter Sunday
1 May	May Day	Første mai	Arbeidernes dag, International Workers' Day, Labour Day
17 May	Constitution Day	Grunnlovsdagen	Celebration of the Constitution of 1814
Moveable Thursday	Ascension Day	Kristi himmelfartsdag	39 days after Easter
Moveable Sunday	Whit Sunday	Første pinsedag	49 days after Easter
Moveable Monday	Whit Monday	Andre pinsedag	50 days after Easter
25 December	Christmas Day	Første juledag	Christmas Day
26 December	Second Day of Christmas	Andre juledag	A Christian saint's day celebrated on 26 December in the Western Church and 27 December in the Eastern Church

Besides, 24 December is commonly observed as Christmas Eve, 31 December is commonly observed as New Year's Eve. On these dates, private sectors always take half-day off to their employees after noon.
