= Flag flying days in Finland =

National Flag of Finland

State Flag of Finland

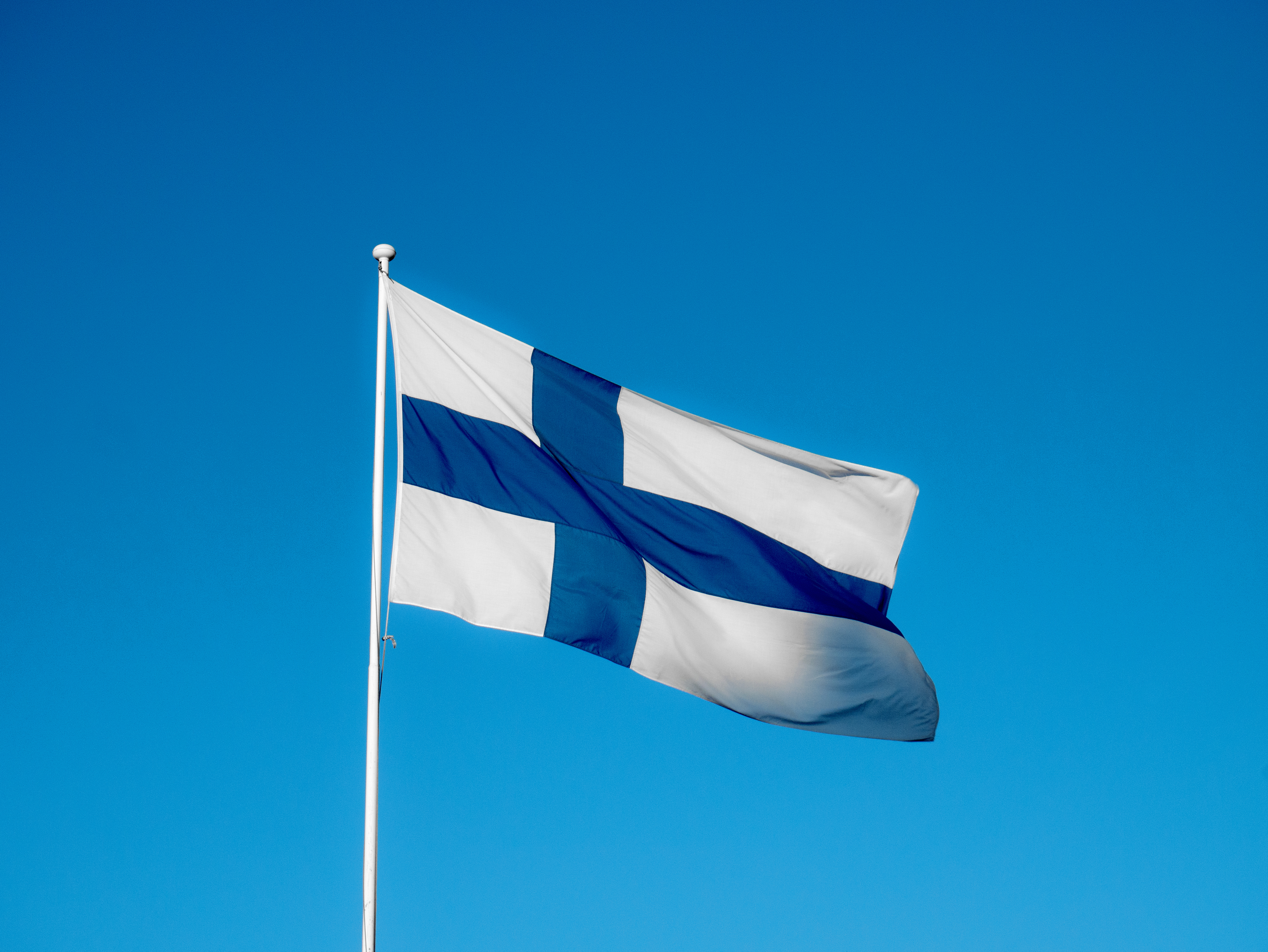
Flag of Finland waving from a pole

Flag flying days in Finland are days of the year when the national flag is flown nationwide, either by law or by custom. The flag of Finland is generally flown only on special occasions to celebrate or honour someone or something. On certain days of the year, the state officially flies the flag, and recommends all private citizens to do so as well; these flag flying days are listed below. Any citizen has a right to fly the flag on their own property if they deem it appropriate, for example, in celebration of birthdays or weddings in the family. Midsummer's Day is additionally celebrated as Flag Day in Finland.

== Legal enforcement ==
By law, the Finnish flag must be flown from public buildings on the following days. It is recommended that private citizens to also fly the flag on these days.

Date	English name	Finnish name	Swedish name	Remarks
28 February	Kalevala Day, Day of Finnish culture	Kalevalan päivä or suomalaisen kulttuurin päivä	Kalevaladagen or den finska kulturens dag	On this day in 1835, Elias Lönnrot signed the preface of the first edition of Kalevala.
1 May	Labour Day	vappu	första maj	
Second Sunday in May	Mother's Day	äitienpäivä	morsdagen	
4 June	Flag Day of the Finnish Defence Forces	puolustusvoimain lippujuhlan päivä	försvarets fanfest	Birthday of Carl Gustaf Emil Mannerheim, Marshal of Finland
Saturday between 20 and 26 June	Midsummer Day	juhannus	midsommardagen	The occasion is also celebrated as the Day of the Finnish Flag. The flag is hoisted on Midsummer's eve at 6 PM and flown through the night until 9 PM the next day.
Second Sunday in November	Father's Day	isänpäivä	farsdagen	
6 December	Independence Day	itsenäisyyspäivä	självständighetsdagen	Finnish Declaration of Independence was adopted on 6 December 1917.
Movable	Days when Finland holds parliamentary, presidential and local elections, elections to the European Parliament, or a referendum			
Movable	The day the President of Finland is inaugurated	presidentin virkaanastumispäivä	den dag då republikens president tillträder sitt ämbete	1 February or 1 March in every six years

== Customary flag days ==
It has become customary to fly the Finnish flag on the following occasions. These dates are also listed in the Finnish State Calendar compiled by the University of Helsinki, and it is recommended that the flag is flown on these occasions.

Date	English name	Finnish name	Swedish name	Remarks
5 February	Runeberg Day	Runebergin päivä	Runebergsdagen	Birthday of the national poet Johan Ludvig Runeberg
19 March	Minna Canth Day, Day of Equality	Minna Canthin päivä or tasa-arvon päivä	Minna Canth-dagen or jämställdhetsdagen	Birthday of novelist and playwright Minna Canth
9 April	Mikael Agricola Day, Day of the Finnish language	suomen kielen päivä	Mikael Agricoladagen or finska språkets dag	On this day, Mikael Agricola, the founder of the literary Finnish language died, and Elias Lönnrot, a collector of folklore was born.
27 April	National Veterans' Day	kansallinen veteraanipäivä	nationella veterandagen	World War II in Finland ended on 27 April 1945.
9 May	Europe Day	Eurooppa-päivä	Europadagen	It is advised by the Finnish Ministry of the Interior that the European Union flag is flown alongside the Finnish flag on this day.
12 May	Day of Finnish Identity	J.V. Snellmannin päivä or suomalaisuuden päivä	Snellmansdagen or finskhetens dag	Birthday of the statesman Johan Vilhelm Snellman
Third Sunday in May	Remembrance Day	kaatuneitten muistopäivä	de stupades dag	A memorial day for everyone who has died in Finnish wars, combat-like duties or peacekeeping operations both during fighting and after they've ceased, including those executed or who have died as a POW.
6 July	Eino Leino Day, Day of Summer and Poetry	Eino Leinon päivä or Runon ja suven päivä	Eino Leinodagen or diktens och sommarens dag	Birthday of the poet Eino Leino
The last Saturday in August	Finland's Nature Day	Suomen luonnon päivä	den finska naturens dag	
1 October	Miina Sillanpää Day, Day of Civic Participation	Minna Sillanpään päivä or kansalaisvaikuttamisen päivä	Miina Sillanpää-dagen or medborgarinflytandets dag	The date commemorates the declaration of universal suffrage in Finland on 1 October 1906.
10 October	Aleksis Kivi Day, Finnish Literature Day	Aleksis Kiven päivä or suomalaisen kirjallisuuden päivä	Aleksis Kividagen or den finska litteraturens dag	Birthday of the national writer Aleksis Kivi
24 October	United Nations Day	Yhdistyneiden kansakuntien päivä	FN-dagen	United Nations began its operations on 24 October 1945.
6 November	Finland Swedish Heritage Day	ruotsalaisuuden päivä	svenska dagen	Coincides with Gustavus Adolphus Day in Sweden.
20 November	Day of Children's Rights	lapsen oikeuksien päivä	barnkonventionens dag	Declaration of the Rights of the Child was adopted by the UN on 20 November 1959.
8 December	Jean Sibelius Day, Finnish Music Day	Jean Sibeliuksen päivä or suomalaisen musiikin päivä	Jean Sibeliusdagen or den finländska musikens dag	Birthday of Finnish composer Jean Sibelius.

== Other recommended flag days in 2025 ==
Date	English name	Finnish name	Swedish name	Remarks
3 February	Alvar and Aino Aalto Day, Day of Finnish Architecture and Design	Alvar ja Aino Aallon sekä suomalaisen arkkitehtuurin ja muotoilun päivä	Alvar och Aino Aaltos samt finsk arkitekturs och formgivnings dag	Birthday of the architect Alvar Aalto
6 February	Sámi National Day	saamelaisten kansallispäivä	samernas nationaldag	The first international Sámi congress began on 6 February 1917.
8 April	International Romani Day	Romanien kansallispäivä	Romernas nationaldag	In honour of the first major international Romani meeting on 7–12 April 1971
9 August	Tove Jansson Day, Day of Finnish Art	Tove Janssonin ja suomalaisen taiteen päivä	Tove Janssons samt finska konstens dag	Birthday of the artist Tove Jansson

== See also ==
- Public holidays in Finland
- National anthem of Finland
- Finnish national symbols
- Household pennant of Finland
- Flag Day (a list of Flag Day holidays in various countries)
- Flag flying days in Norway
- Flag flying days in Sweden
