= Victoria Days =

Swedish crown princess Victoria's birthday

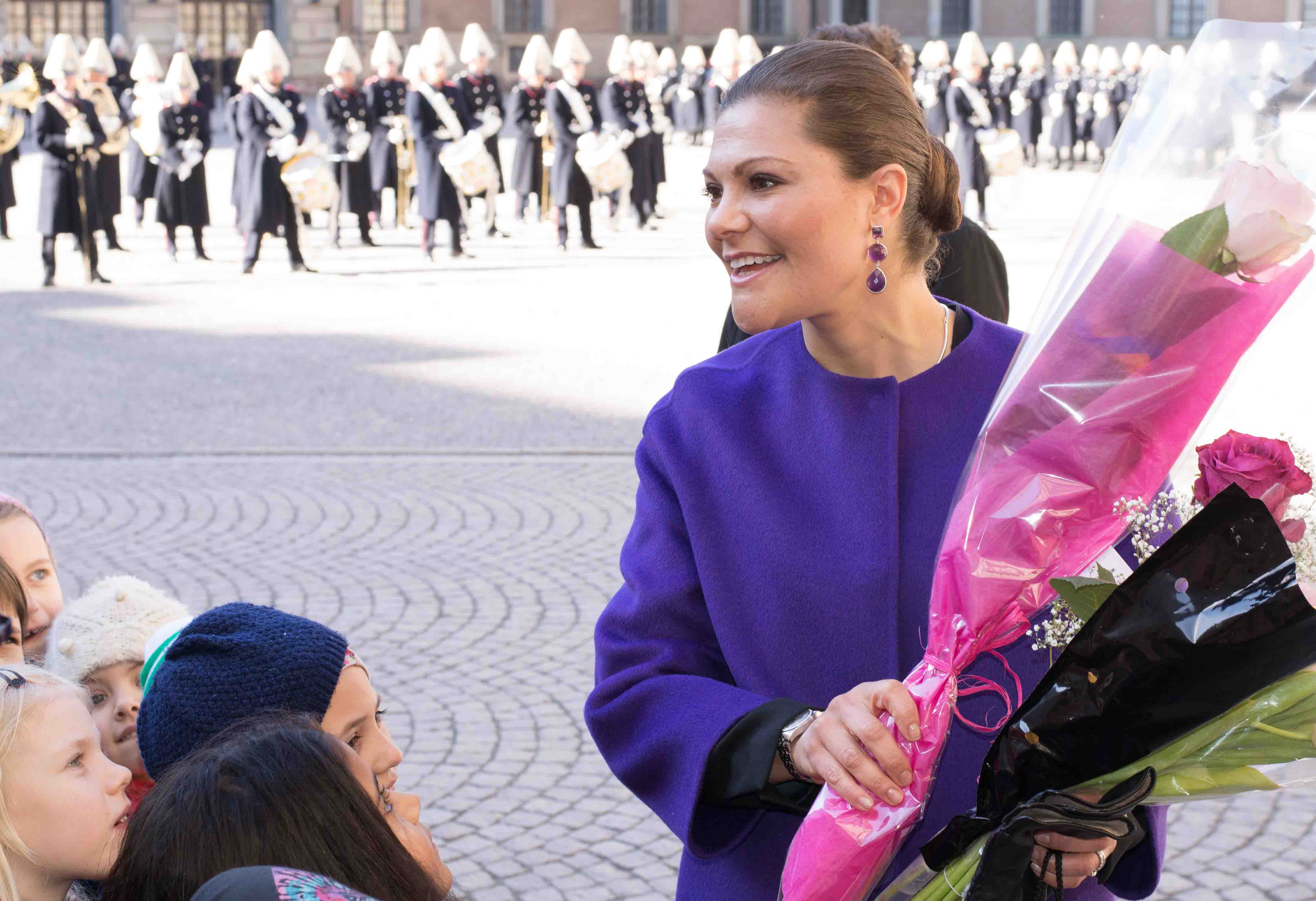
- Crown Princess Victoria in March 2015
- Official name: Victoriadagen
- Also called: Victoria's Days
- Observed by: Sweden
- Significance: Crown Princess Victoria of Sweden's Birthday
- Celebrations: Walkabout, concert, scholarship
- Begins: 1979
- Date: July
- Next time: 1 July 2027
- Frequency: annual

The Victoria Days (Swedish: Victoriadagarna), earlier: Victoria Day (Swedish: Victoriadagen), is an annual celebration in Sweden in mid-July to celebrate Crown Princess Victoria's birthday.

It is celebrated around the time of the princess's birthday, 14 July, which is also a flag flying day; for milestone birthdays the celebrations may be held over multiple days. This birthday tradition started in 1979, with Crown Princess Victoria's 2nd birthday.

The Victoria Days celebrations usually take place on the island of Öland, where the Swedish royal family spends their summer holiday. The day often begins at Solliden Palace, where the Crown Princess family, King and Queen greet waiting crowds. The crowds sing "Happy Birthday to You" to Victoria, followed by cheers led by King Carl XVI Gustaf of Sweden. The royal family then do a walkabout. Each year a concert is held, with performances from famous artists. The concert is attended by the royal family and broadcast on TV.

== Victoria Award ==
Each year during Victoria Days, the Victoria Award (Victoriastipendiet) is awarded to a Swedish sportsperson who has performed an especially meritorious achievement during the year.
