= Constitution Day (Norway) =

Public holiday in Norway

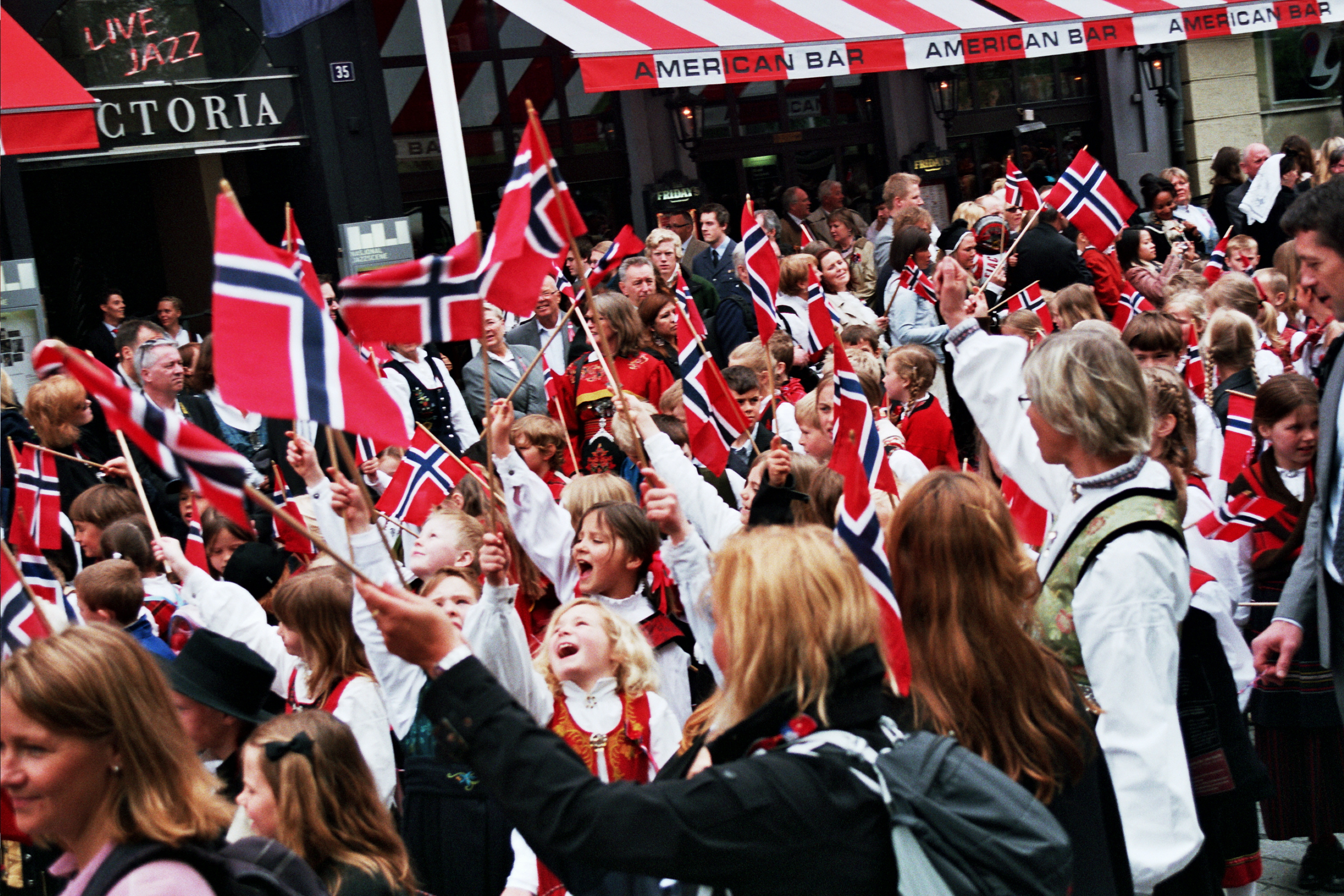
- Children's parade in Oslo, 2010
- Official name: Constitution Day of Norway
- Also called: 17th of May, Syttende mai
- Observed by: Norwegians, Norwegian diaspora
- Significance: Celebrating the signing of the Norwegian Constitution in Eidsvoll, 17 May 1814.
- Celebrations: Parades, flying flags, speeches, memorialisation
- Date: 17 May
- Next time: 17 May 2027
- Frequency: Annual
- Related to: Constitution of Norway; Norwegian Constituent Assembly; Union Dissolution Day (7 June)

Constitution Day is the National Day of Norway, observed annually with an official public holiday on 17 May. Among Norwegians, the day is referred to as Syttende mai ('17th of May'), Nasjonaldagen ('National Day'), or Grunnlovsdagen ('Constitution Day'), although the latter is less frequent.

The holiday is celebrated with large parades in which participants wear the Norwegian national costume, the bunad. During the festivities, people eat hot dogs, waffles and ice cream, and children play playground games.

== Historical background ==
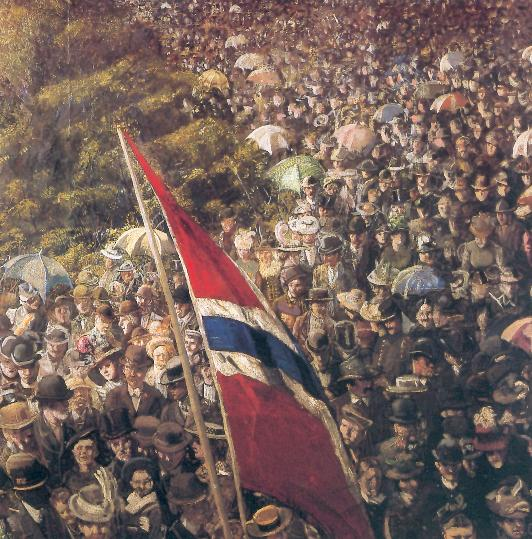
17th of May 1893 by Norwegian painter Christian Krohg (1852–1925). The flag does not have the Union mark of Sweden and Norway, the so-called sildesalaten "herring salad".

The Constitution of Norway was signed at Eidsvoll on 17 May 1814. It is the third oldest written constitution still in use. The constitution declared Norway to be an independent kingdom in an attempt to avoid being ceded to Sweden after Denmark–Norway's devastating defeat in the Napoleonic Wars. This established a Union between Sweden and Norway.

Observance on the 17th of May began spontaneously among students and others soon after the signing of the Constitution. However, Norway was at that time in a personal union with Sweden (following the Convention of Moss in August 1814, by which they shared a monarch as separate nations) and for some years King Charles XIII of Sweden and Norway was reluctant to allow the celebrations. For a few years during the 1820s, King Charles XIV John banned it, believing that celebrations like this were a kind of protest for, or even revolt against, the union. The king's attitude changed after the Battle of the Square in 1829, an incident which resulted in such commotion that the king had to allow commemorations on the day.

It was not until 1833 that public addresses were held, and official celebration was initiated near the monument of former government minister Christian Krohg, who had spent much of his political life curbing the personal power of the monarch. The address was held by Henrik Wergeland, thoroughly witnessed and accounted for by an informant dispatched by the king himself.

After 1864 the day became more established when the first children's parade was launched in Christiania, at first consisting only of boys. This initiative was taken by Bjørnstjerne Bjørnson, although Wergeland made the first known children's parade at Eidsvoll around 1820. It was only in 1899 that girls were allowed to join in the parade for the first time. In 1905, the union with Sweden was dissolved and Prince Carl of Denmark was chosen to be King of an independent Norway, under the name Haakon VII. Obviously, this ended any Swedish concern for the activities of the National Day.

During World War II when Norway was under occupation by the Nazis, it was strictly forbidden for Norwegians to celebrate 17 May, participate in any procession, or to use the colors of the Norwegian flag on clothes. At the liberation on 8 May 1945, the Norwegian flag therefore became a strong symbol of Norway's freedom.

May 8 is now celebrated as Liberation Day in Norway. The day is used to celerate the end of World War II and honour veterans, but it is not an official holiday. Instead, a new and broader meaning has been added to the celebration of Norwegian Constitution Day on 17 May to reflect the victory over Nazi oppression.

== Children's parades ==
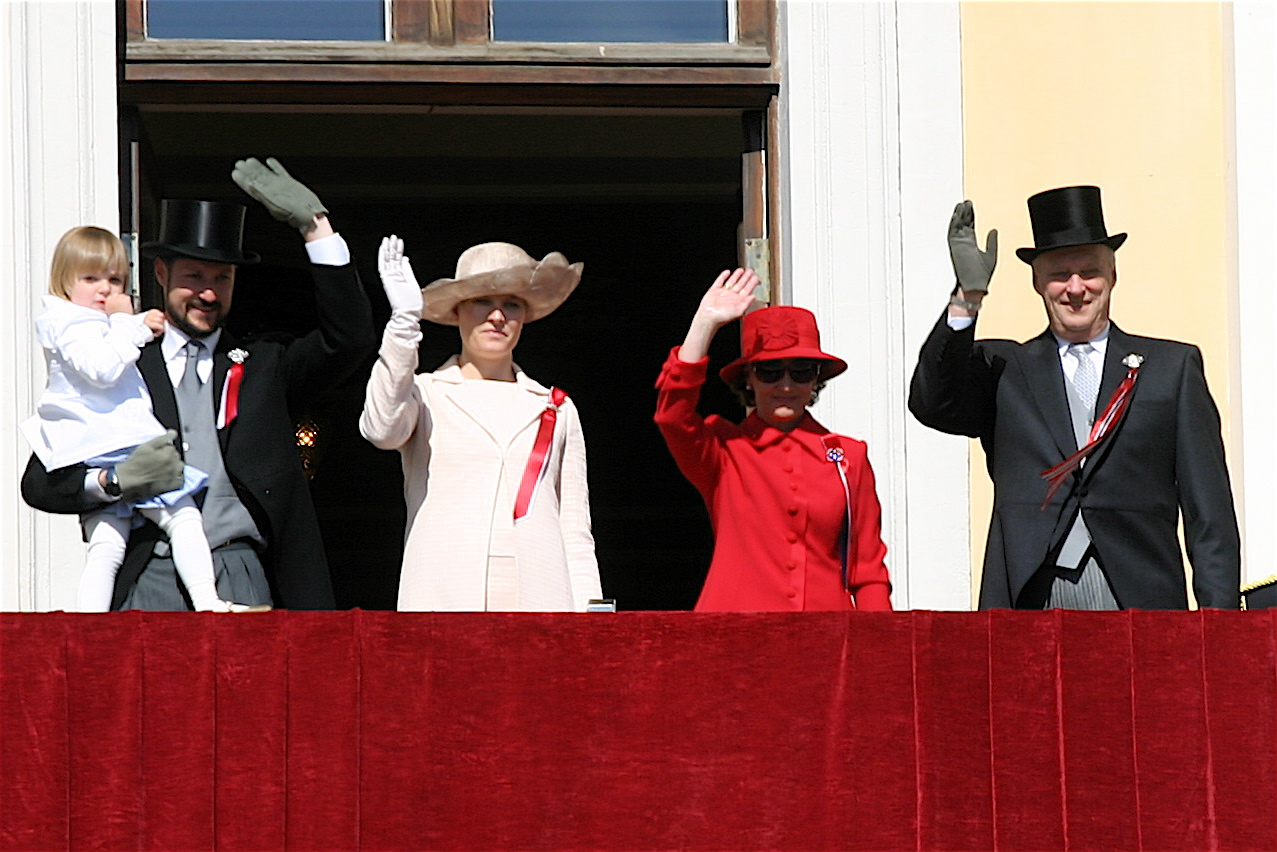
In Oslo, the children's parade ends in the palace gardens of the Royal Palace with the Norwegian royal family present on the balcony. 2006

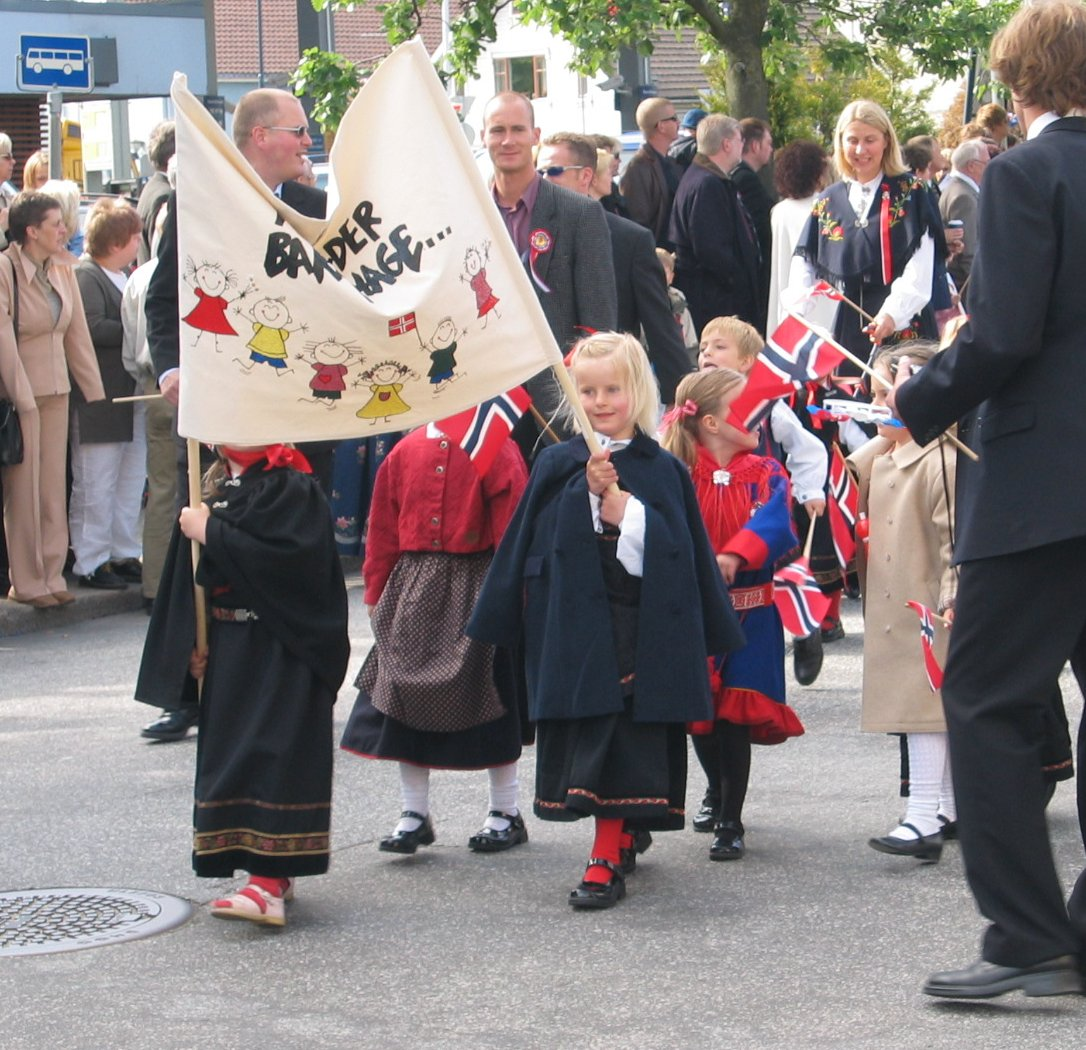
The kindergarten part of a Children's parade. The Gákti, the traditional clothing of the Sami people, is used by one of the small children.

A noteworthy aspect of the Norwegian Constitution Day is its non-military nature. All over Norway, children's parades with an abundance of flags form the central elements of the celebration. Each elementary school district arranges its own parade with marching bands between schools. The parade takes the children through the community, often making stops at homes of senior citizens, war memorials, etc. The longest parade is in Oslo, where some 100,000 people travel to the city centre to participate in the main festivities. This is broadcast on TV every year, with comments on costumes, banners, etc., together with local reports from celebrations around the country. The massive Oslo parade includes some 100 schools, marching bands, and passes the royal palace where the royal family greet the people from the main balcony.

Typically, a school's children parade will consist of some senior school children carrying the school's official banner, followed by a handful of other older children carrying full-size Norwegian flags, and the school's marching band. After the band, the rest of the school children follow with hand-held flags, often with the junior forms first, and often behind self-made banners for each form or even individual class. Nearby kindergartens may also have been invited to join in. As the parade passes, bystanders often join in behind the official parade and follow the parade back to the school.

Depending on the community, the parade may make stops at particular sites along the route, such as a nursing home or war memorial. In Oslo, the parade stops at the Royal Palace while Skaugum, the home of the crown prince, has been a traditional waypoint for parades in Asker.

During the parade, a marching band will play and the children will sing lyrics about the celebration of the National Day. The parade concludes with the stationary singing of the national anthem "Ja, vi elsker dette landet" (typically verses 1, 7 and 8), and the royal anthem, "Kongesangen".

In addition to flags, people typically wear red, white and blue ribbons. Although a long-standing tradition, it has lately become more popular for men, women and children to wear traditional outfits, called bunad. The children shout "Hurra!", sing, blow whistles and shake rattles.

== Additional celebration ==
All over Norway, memorials to the fallen at wars and to other notable national people are honoured with speeches and wreaths early in the morning. In many places (like in Oslo) at noon, a salute is fired.

In addition to children's parades, there are parades for the public (borgertog), where every citizen is welcome to join in. These are led by marching bands and often local Boy Scouts and Girl Guides, local choirs, and NGOs. This takes place in the early morning or in the afternoon, before or after the school's parade.

All parades begin or end with speeches. Both adults and older children are invited to speak. After the parades, there are games for the children, and ice cream, soda, sweets and hot dogs are consumed.

== Russ ==
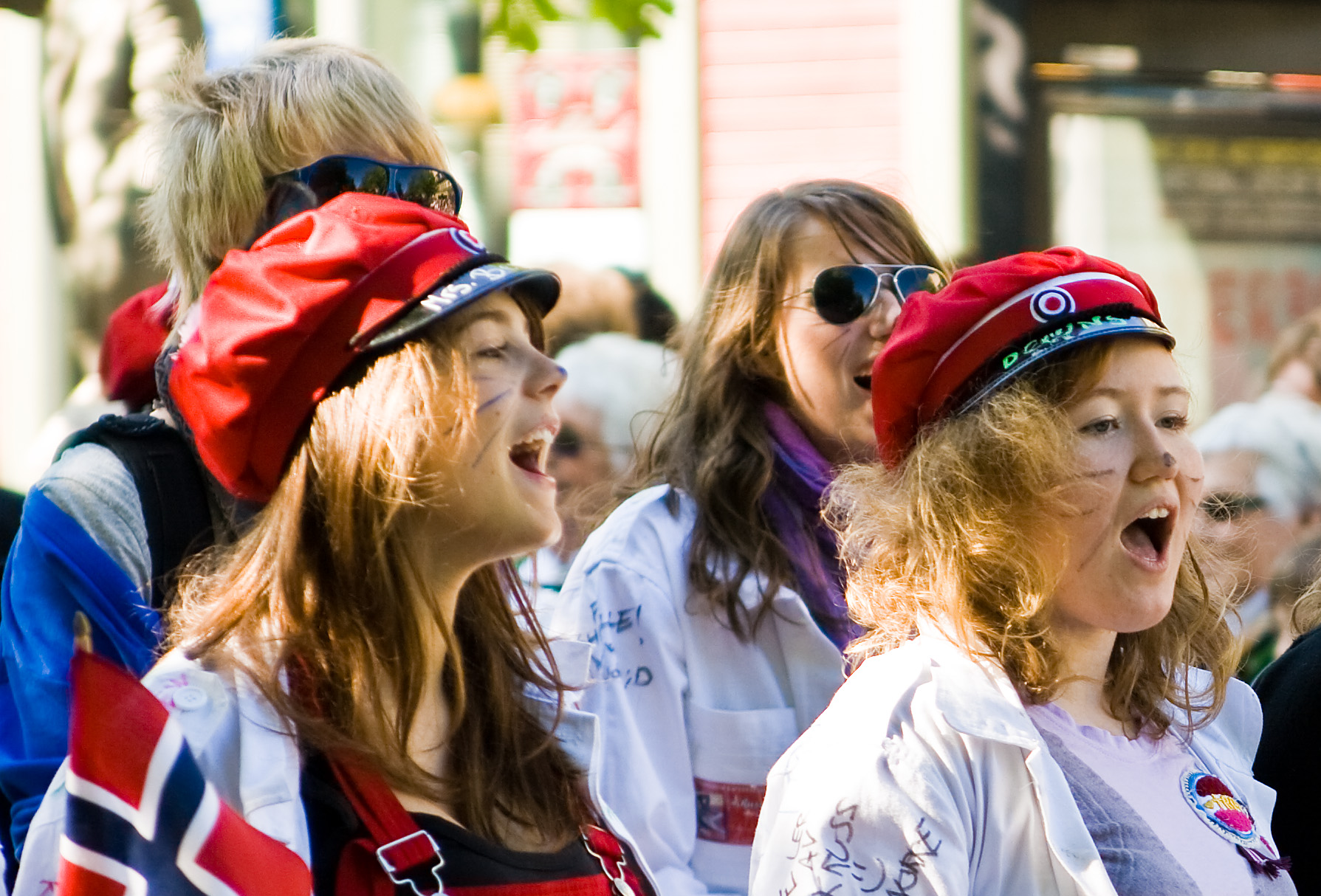
High school graduates, "russ", during the children's parade in Trondheim

The graduating class from videregående (upper secondary school, sixth form) the Norwegian equivalent of high school, known as russ, has its own celebration on 17 May, staying up all night and making the rounds through the community. The russ also have their own parades later in the day, usually around 4 or 5 pm. Russ parade through the street carrying signs. They may parody various local and political aspects, although this has become less frequent. Russ parades have lately become smaller and smaller due to diligent police discouragement.

== Celebration across the country ==
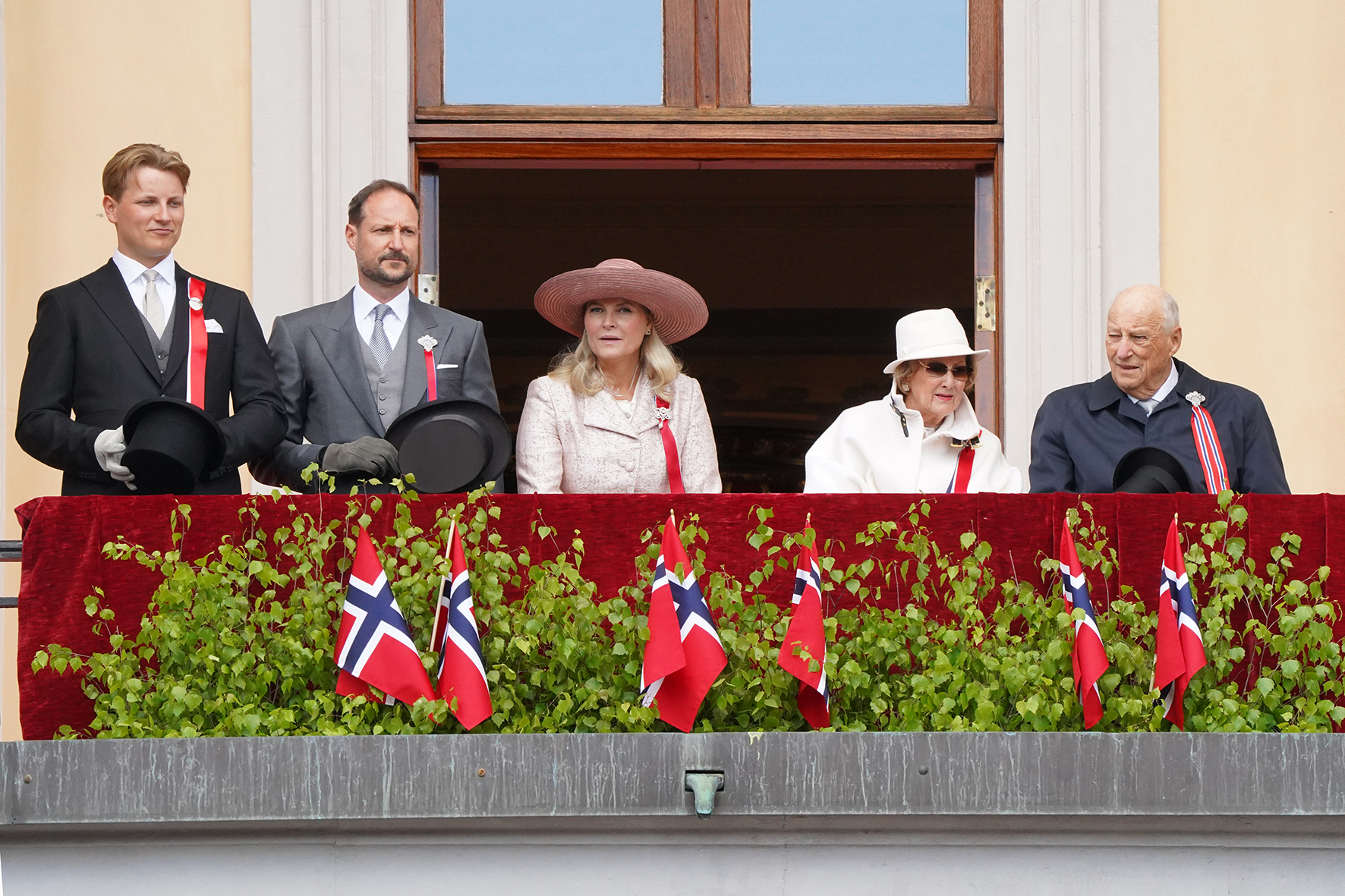
Oslo, Royal Palace, 17. mai 2026, Norway Constitution Day. Royal Family on balcony greets children parade: Prince Sverre Magnus, Crown Prince Haakon, Crown Princess Mette-Marit, Queen Sonja, King Harald V. Photo by Vadim Chuprina

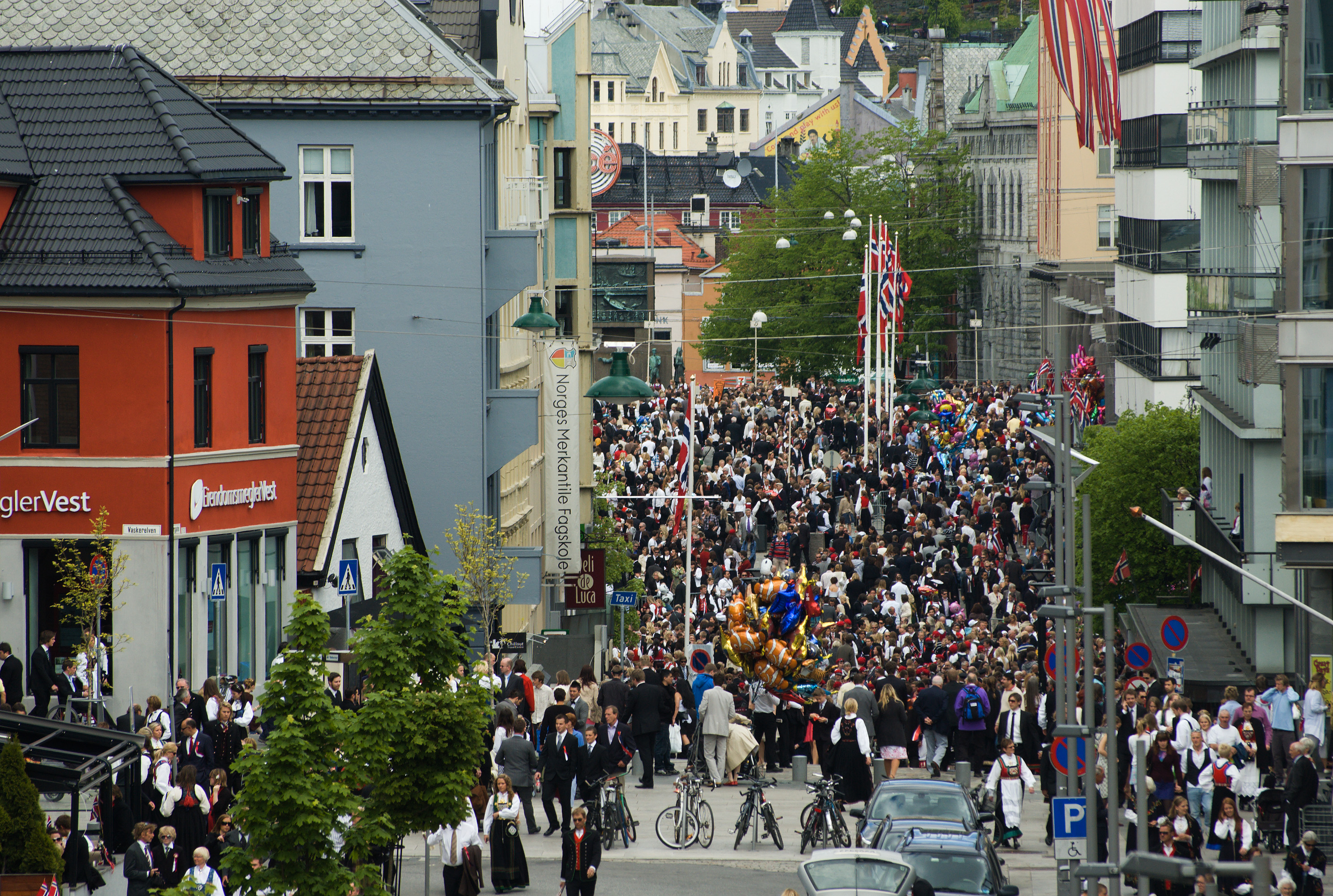
The city of Bergen is full of people, and 17 May has a strong tradition in the city.

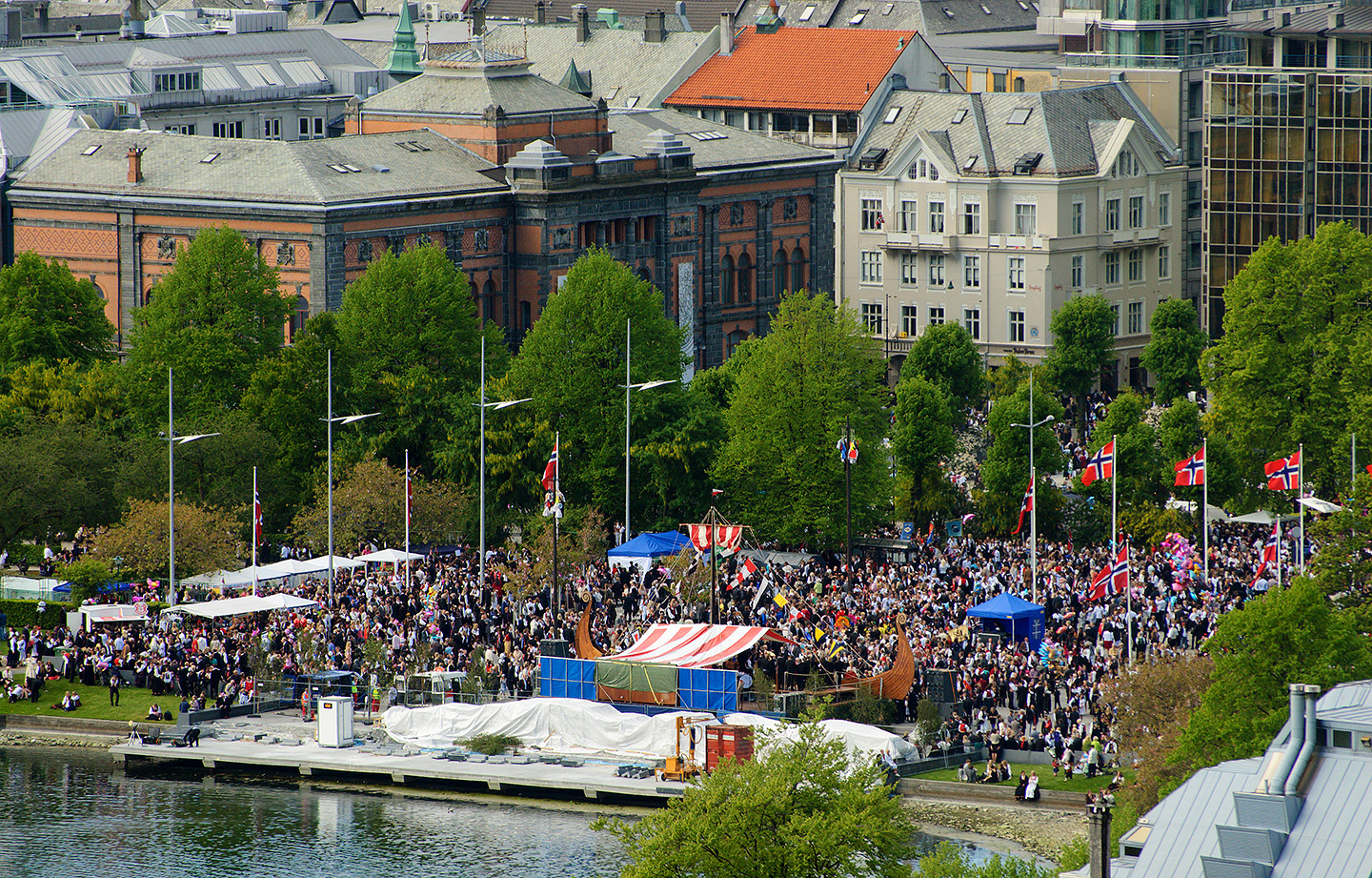
Norwegian constitution day celebration in Bergen, Norway

Constitution Day is celebrated in most small settlements and larger towns across Norway, with many variations.

- In the nation's capital city, Oslo, children from most of the local schools gather to parade past the Royal Palace, where they and the royal family exchange waves and greetings.
- In the municipality of Asker, outside Oslo, the children gather outside the residence of the Crown Prince and Princess at Skaugum Estate in the morning (giving the Crown Prince and his family time to attend the parade in Oslo later in the day).
- Bergen has its own traditions for the parade, including comic troupes, various local organisations, a children's parade, and the unique buekorps.
- In Trondheim, children from all the city's schools parade the streets of Trondheim in the morning. Later in the afternoon, the "Citizens Parade" (Borgertoget) starts. This is a parade where firefighters, sports teams, students associations and other associations are represented.
- In Stavanger the day starts with a salute at 7 am. Later there are Children's Parade, Russ Parade and finally Citizens Parade. The British school has, since the 1970s, and later copied by the Dutch school and the American school, carried flags from a number of countries from all over the world. An international party day is also arranged in the central Bjerkstedparken every 17 May.
- In Kristiansand, in addition to parades of schoolchildren and citizens earlier that day, the city is known for the conclusion of the National Day with running through the city centre ("Tapto") and a spectacular fireworks display. For those who want to continue the party until midnight, a trad jazz band with local touches plays until midnight in front of the Christiansholm Fortress (Free entrance).

In addition to the children's parades the streets across the country are filled with young and old, turning out in festive attire, and vendors selling ice cream, hot dogs, and more recently, kebabs.

== Celebration abroad ==
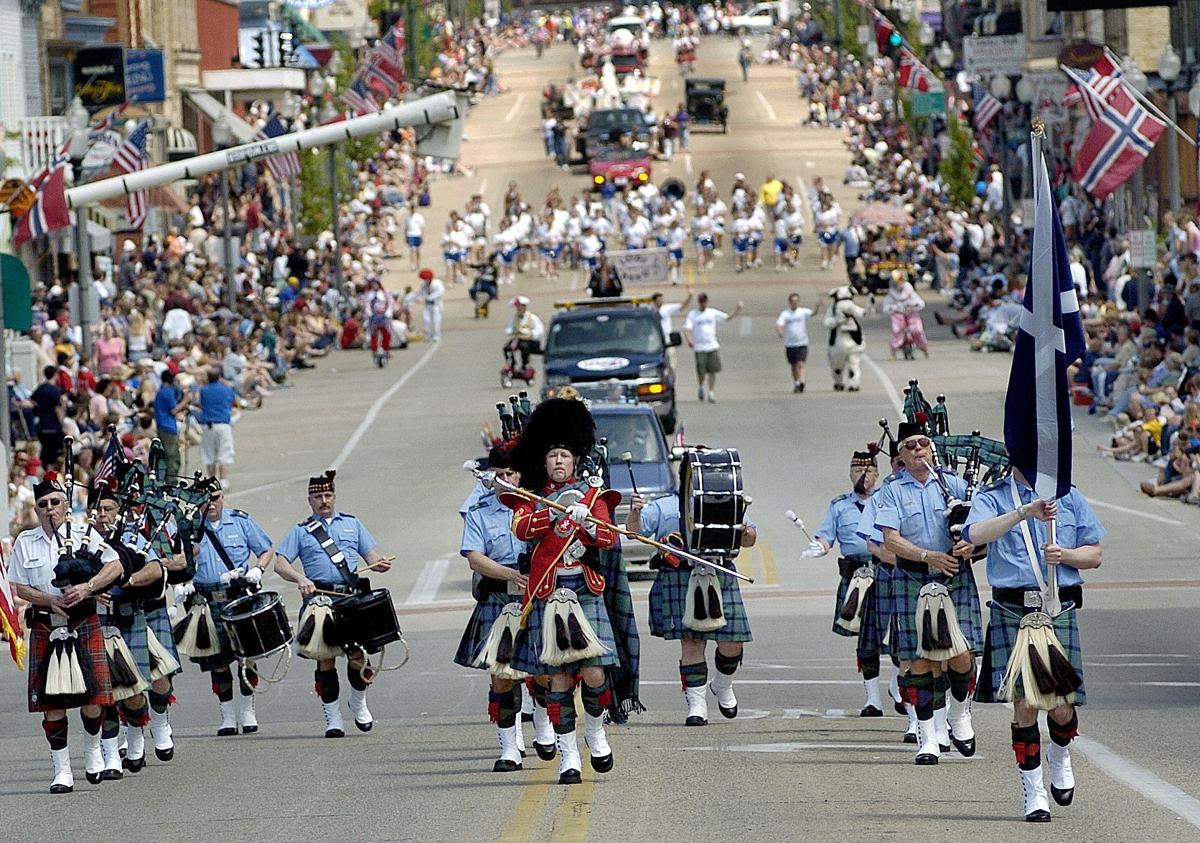
The annual Syttende mai parade in Stoughton, Wisconsin

Syttende mai is also celebrated in many Norwegian migrant communities throughout the world, with traditional foods, sometimes including lutefisk. In the United States and Canada, the local lodges of the Sons of Norway often play a central part in organizing the festivities.

The Bay Ridge, Brooklyn neighborhood in Brooklyn, New York City, has had an annual 17 May parade and celebration since 1952. It is well-attended and celebrated by Norwegian Americans who immigrated to Brooklyn in the early 20th century.

One major celebration occurs in Petersburg, Alaska, also known as "Little Norway". The town is a Norwegian settlement and strongly retains its roots. The festival occurs the weekend closest to 17 May and includes a parade, Leikarring dancers, herring toss, Norwegian food such as lefse and a pack of vikings and valkyries.

Another major Syttende mai celebration occurs in Stoughton, Wisconsin, which, along with the Ballard neighborhood of Seattle, Washington, claims to be the second largest in the world after Oslo, and the largest in the US. Festivities include canoe racing, two parades, an art fair, a half marathon run around the Stoughton community, and a great deal of bratwurst consumption. The festival features the Stoughton High School Norwegian Dancers, a group that tours the country showcasing traditional ethnic dances of Scandinavia.

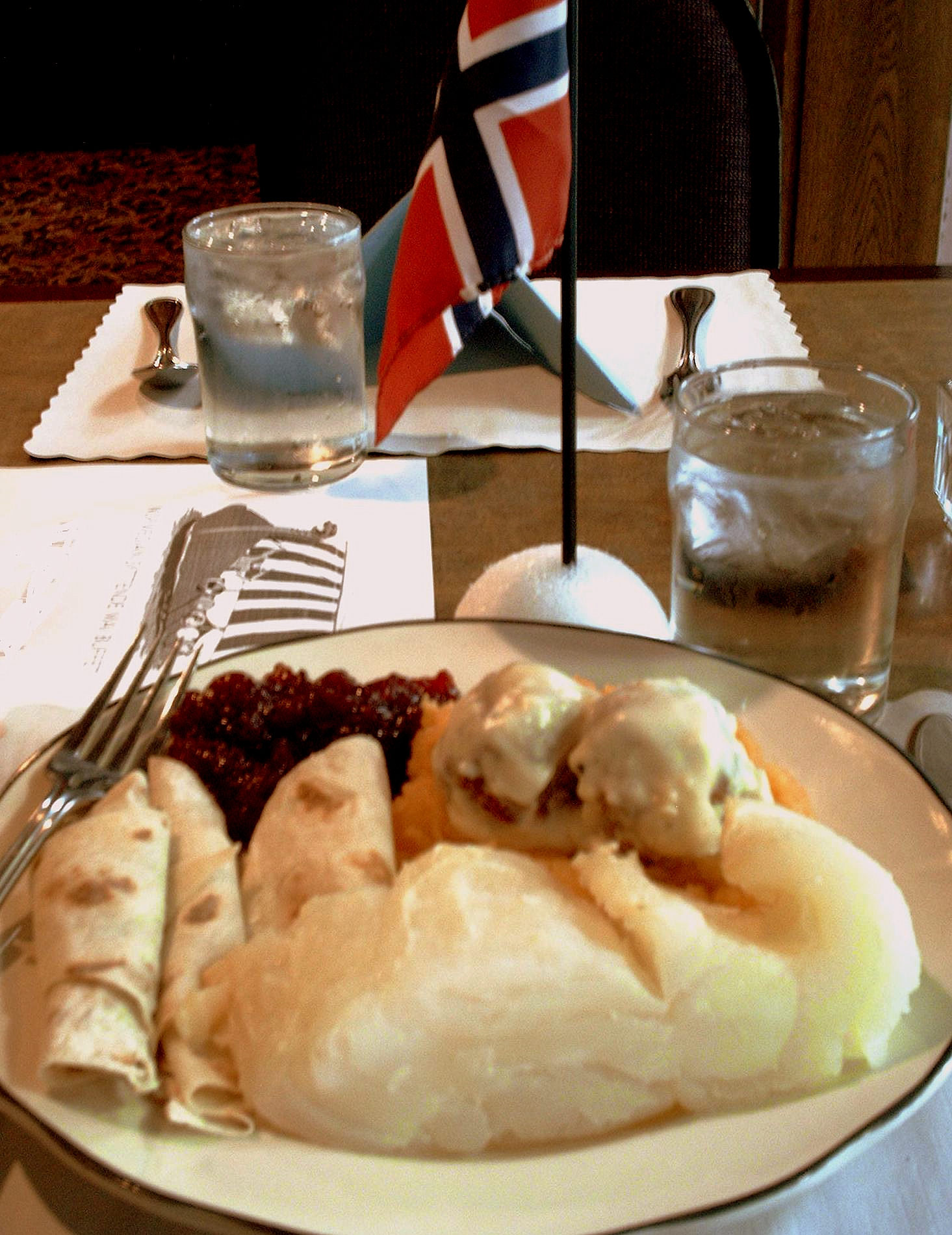
17 May dinner in the United States of lutefisk, rutabaga, meatballs, lingonberry jam, and lefse.

Smaller Syttende mai celebrations are held in Norwegian-heritage communities throughout western Wisconsin, Minnesota, and elsewhere in the Midwestern United States. Members of Norway's Parliament Storting travel to Chicago to attend a three-day celebration consisting of a concert, banquet and parade (in Park Ridge, Illinois) hosted by the Norwegian National League. Spring Grove, Minnesota, also hosts a three-day festival on the weekend nearest to Syttende mai, while nearby Decorah, Iowa, the home of Nordic Fest and the Vesterheim Norwegian-American Museum, also hosts a parade. Syttende mai is also celebrated in Oswego, New York. Since 1969, the city of Westby, Wisconsin, has celebrated a four-day festival featuring authentic Norwegian foods, crafts, a "frokost" and Norwegian church service. The historically Norwegian community of Poulsbo, Washington also observes the holiday annually. Epcot's Norwegian Pavilion in Florida, celebrates Constitution Day with numerous flags around the pavilion, as well as parades around the World Showcase Lagoon. Salt Lake City, Utah, holds its annual celebration at the International Peace Gardens. 400–700 people attend each year.

In the United Kingdom, the Norwegian community in London holds a 17 May celebration each year in Southwark Park. The celebration is attended by a large number of Norwegians resident in London and includes a parade, a traditional service in the Norwegian church, and the selling of traditional Norwegian foods such as Solo and makrell i tomat, and many Norwegian flags for Norwegians who have left theirs at home. The Norwegian church in Cardiff celebrates Syttende mai with a parade and a speech about the history of the holiday and a meal of waffles. In Orkney, Scotland, 17 May is celebrated by the Orkney Norway Friendship Association in recognition of the islands' strong historic links with Norway, with similar celebrations taking place in neighbouring Shetland. In Glasgow, Scotland, 17 May is celebrated at Murano Street Student Village where Norwegian students and their friends congregate to enjoy the traditional festivities of the day. This includes the wearing of Norwegian traditional colours as well as the consumption of spectacularly copious amounts of alcoholic beverages.

Stockholm, Sweden, has a largecelebration with a parade starting at Engelbrektsplan and ending at Skansen, in which more than 10,000 participate every year. The event includes Stockholm's only dedicated 17 May marching band, Det Norske Korps.

It is also common for Norwegians living abroad to gather and celebrate. In some countries, typically where the population of Norwegian expatriates is small, the Norwegian embassy is the focus of celebrations, or sometimes the diplomats' spouses arrange an event.

In New Zealand, the 17th of May is celebrated in Fiordland, a Norwegian community located in the fjords and mountains of southwest New Zealand. All Fiordland buildings are made of eucalyptus and are inspired by Norwegian architecture. The event features an exposition of photos and facts about Norway, typical food, and a presentation with six fjord horses along with the Norwegian song "Vi på Langedrag" by Sigmund Groven.

Norsewood in New Zealand also celebrates Norway Day with a church service, folk dancing displays by school children and Norwegian songs performed by the village choir.

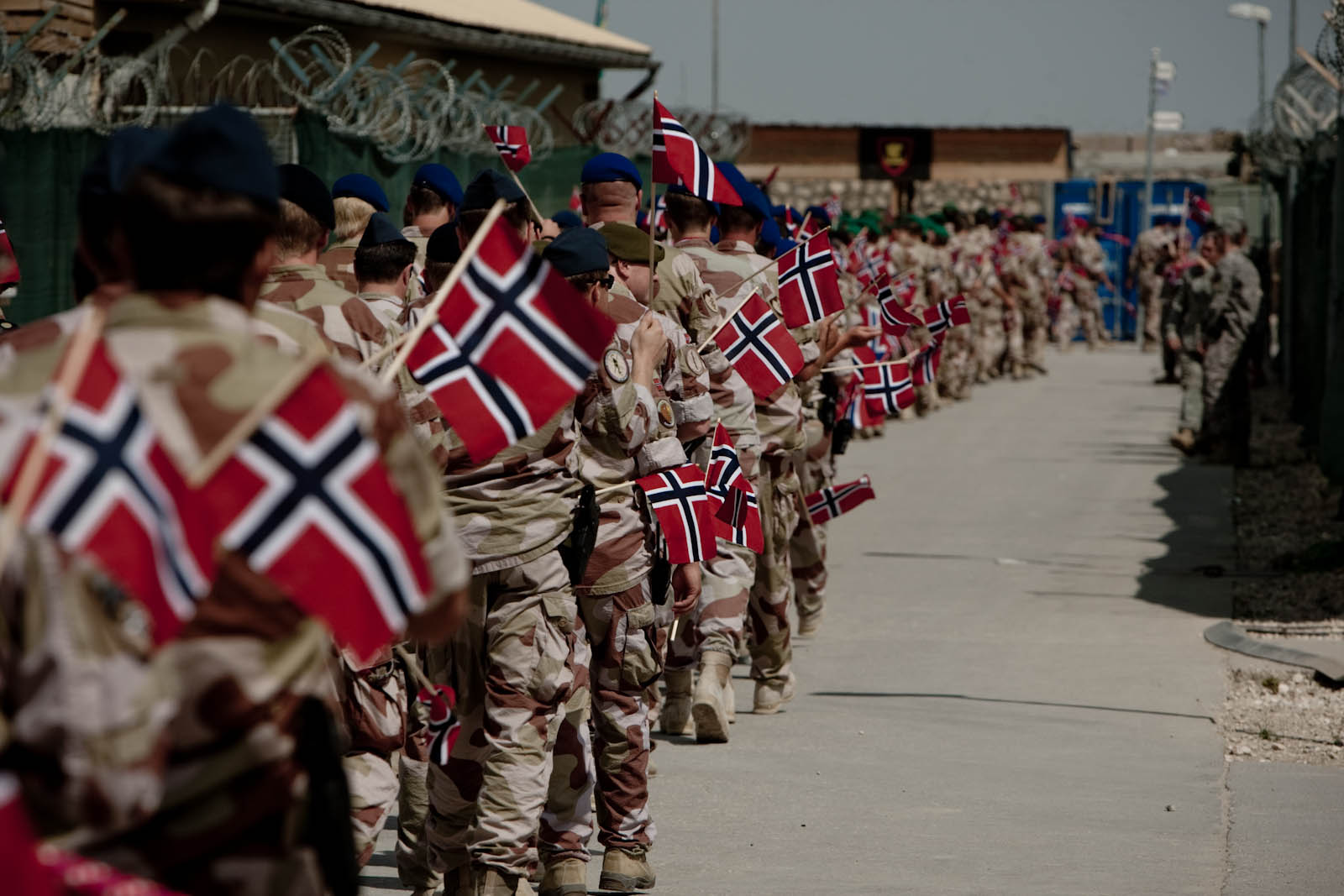
Soldiers celebrating the national holiday in Meymaneh, Afghanistan.

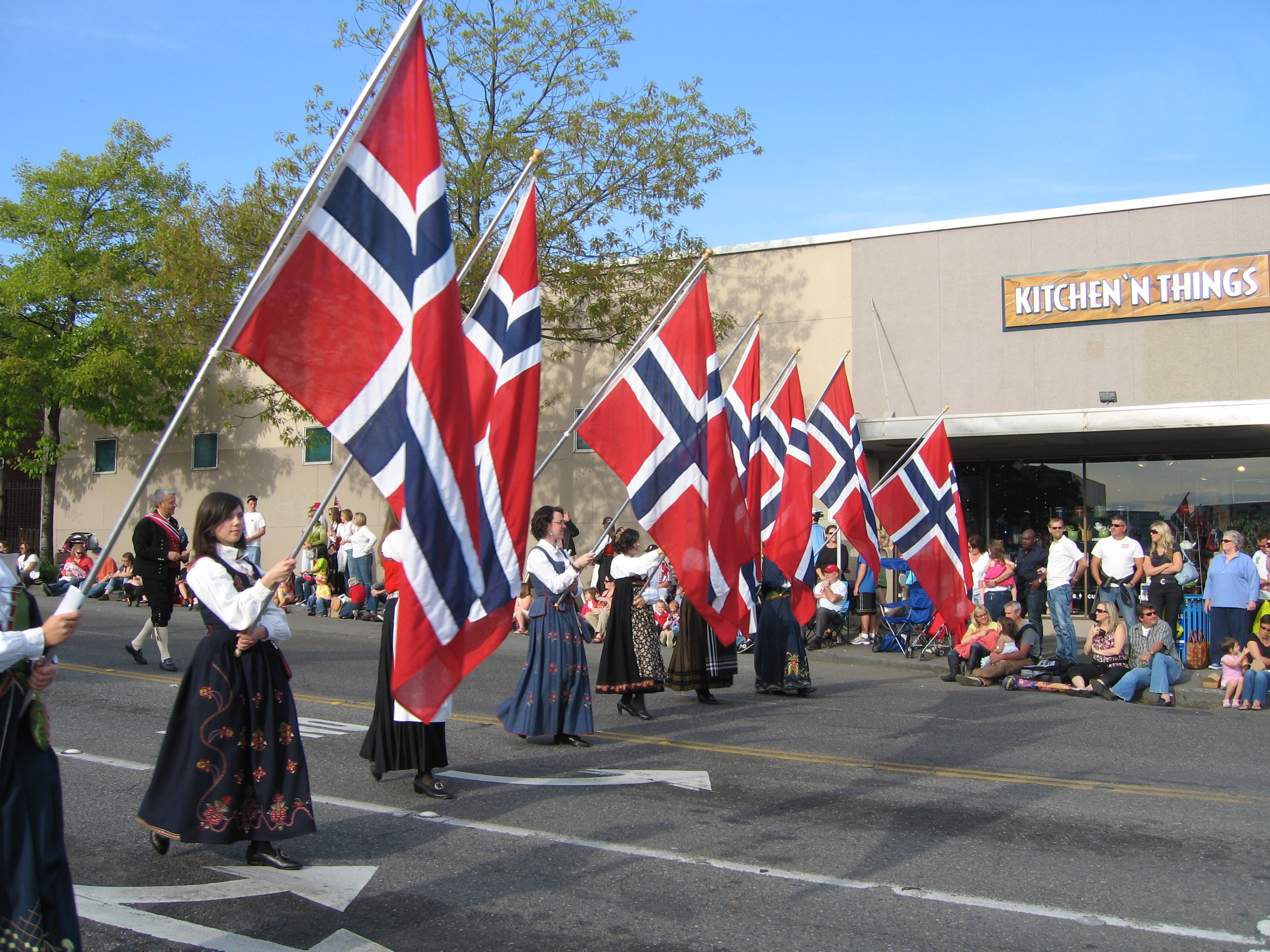
Norwegian Constitution Day, celebrated in Ballard, Seattle.

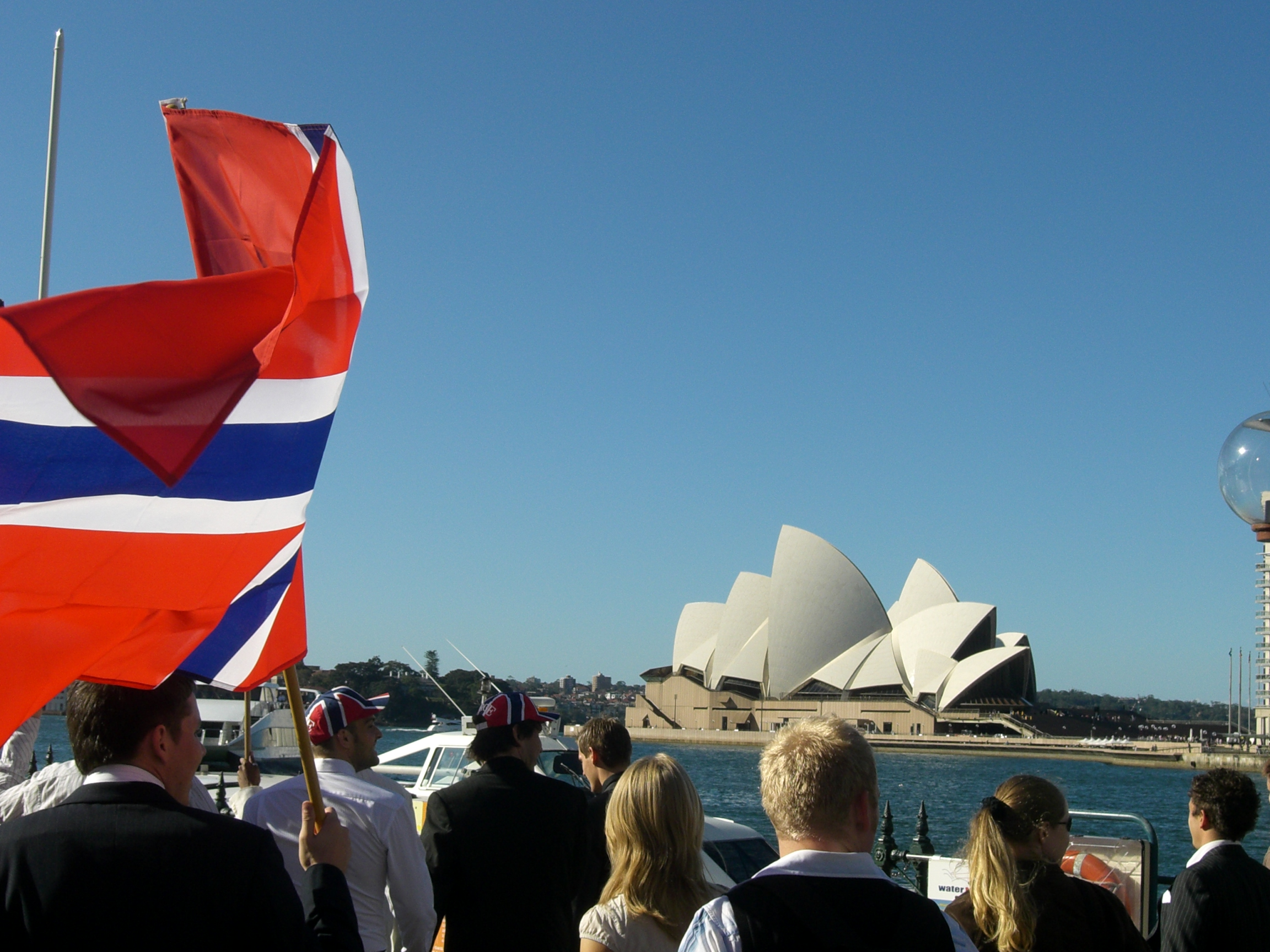
17 May in Sydney

== Henrik Wergeland ==
The poet Henrik Wergeland is credited with making Søttende/Syttende mai a celebratory day for the children rather than a day of patriotic pride. The day demonstrates that the children, i.e. the country's future, are the patriotic pride. Flags and music dominate the day, and there are few military parades. To commemorate his contribution, the russ in Oslo place an oversized hat on his statue near the Storting (Parliament); the Jewish community place a wreath on his grave in the morning as a tribute to his efforts on their behalf.

== Military participation ==
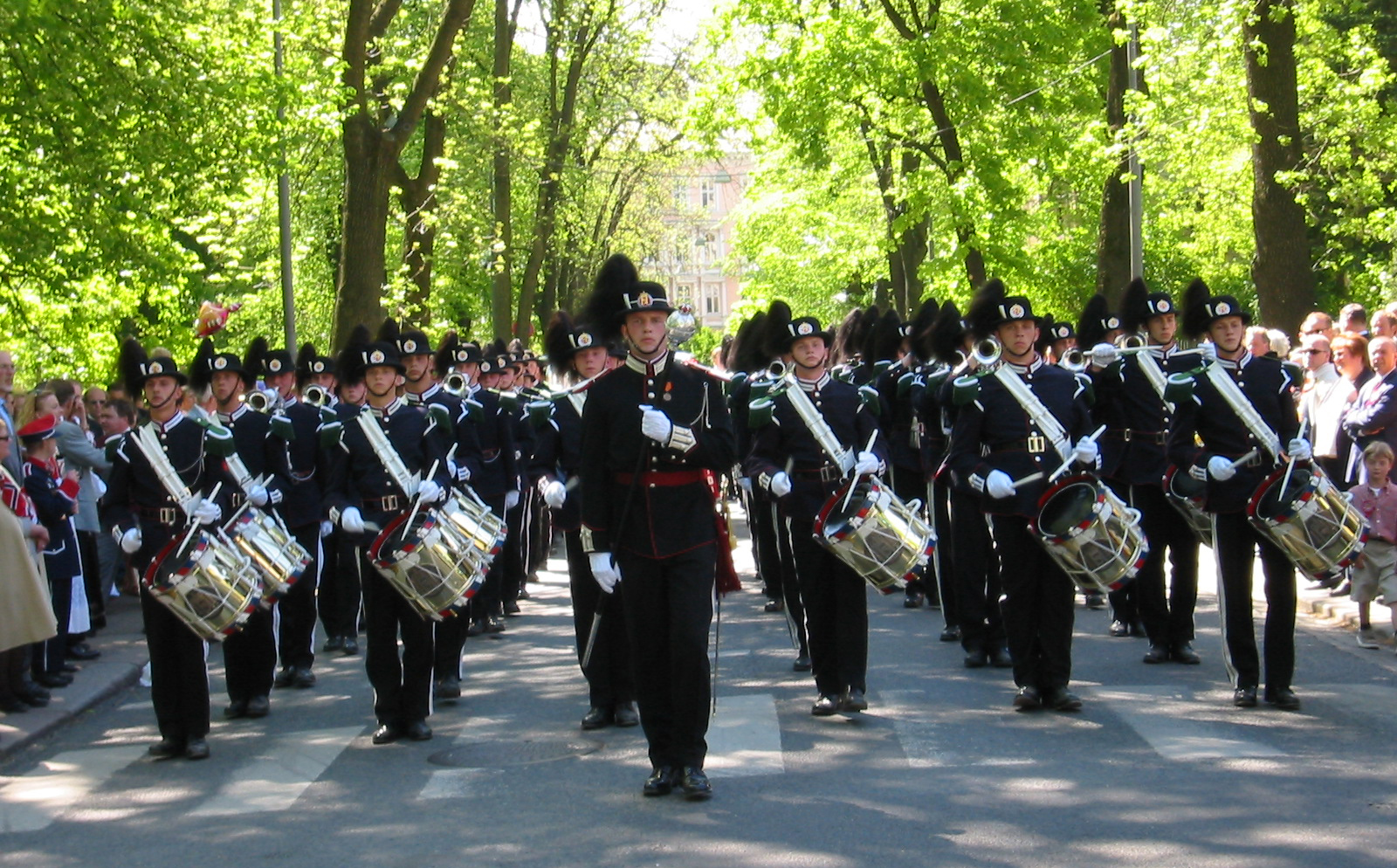
The Royal Guard Norwegian Constitution Day parade

The day is celebrated as a people's day, with limited military participation.

The Royal Guard performs on the main street of the capital city, Oslo. During the parade, the Guard display their drill and musical skills. The marching band of the Royal Guard also attend the children's parade in central Oslo together with the schools' own marching bands, their black uniforms and impeccable drill being a very popular part of the Oslo parade.

Forsvarets Musikkorps Vestlandet (Norwegian Armed Forces' Music Corps Western Norway), followed by parts of the military defence is participating in the parade of Bergen.

== Inclusion of immigrants ==
The former Norwegian president of parliament Jo Benkow noted that the day has increasingly become a celebration of Norway's growing ethnic diversity.

Several factors have probably contributed to the inclusive nature of the celebration:

- The central position of the children's parade, including all lower-level school children, and therefore also their parents in the celebration.
- The celebration is focused around local schools and their children's parade.
- The children's parade reaches outwards, trying to cover as many roads as possible in the local community.
- The low focus on elected government during the celebration. In the capital, for example, the children's parade passes the left side of the parliament building, and the president of parliament is allowed to wave to the passing parade from a small balcony, but the main focus of the parade is the Royal Palace and the royal family. The office of president of parliament is mainly ceremonial and administrative, often awarded in the later part of a political career. The prime minister and the rest of the ruling government on the other hand have no official duties during the celebrations.
- The virtual lack of any military-centred celebration.

One can add that the day should be regarded as an expression of thankfulness, on behalf of the old values of liberty, equality and brotherhood, the ideological basis for the constitution, and also on behalf of the circumstances that led up to the constitution. The aspect of "thanksgiving" in the national celebrations of Norway is easily forgotten in the long span of years from 1814.

There has been dispute over whether foreign flags should be allowed in the parade. In 2008, the 17 May committee of Oslo banned the use of foreign flags, but was overturned by the mayor of Oslo, Fabian Stang. Similar discussions have taken place in other cities. In 2013, the 17 May committee of Ålesund turned down a request from a local school to use handmade paper flags that also included foreign flags. The decision was later overturned.

== See also ==
- Constitution Day – A list of similar holidays in other countries
- Norwegian Constituent Assembly
- Constitution of Norway
- Flag of Norway
- Bunad
- Other national anniversaries of Norway:

Liberation Day (May 8)
Union Dissolution Day
