= Flag-flying day =

Day where all citizens and public/private organizations hoist the national flag

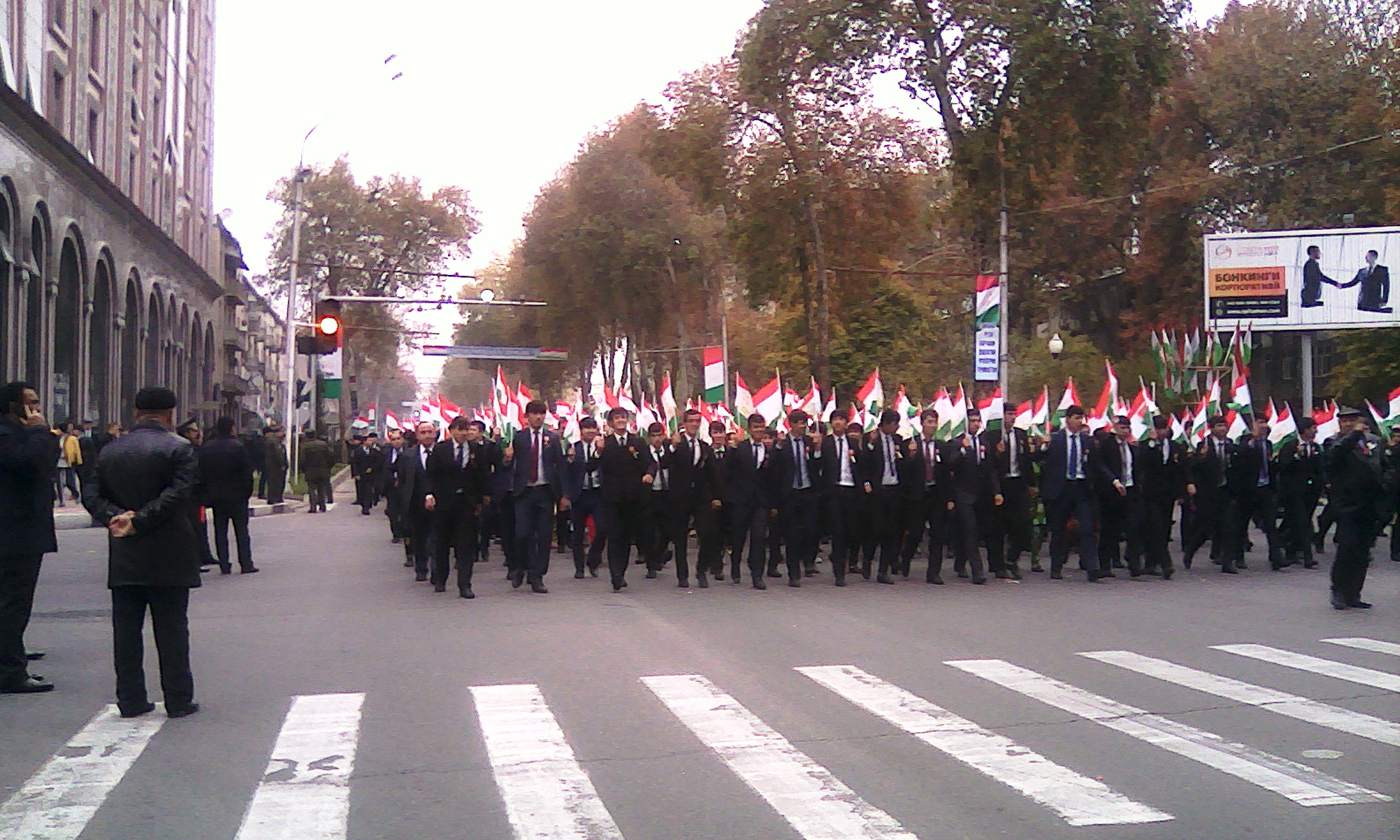
Parade on Tajikistan's flag-flying day, November 24

A flag-flying day is a day, decreed officially or by tradition, that the national flag should be hoisted by every official agency in the country. Private citizens and corporations are also encouraged to fly the flag, rather than leaving the flag staff empty or flying family or corporate flags. Flag-flying days may also be observed for some provincial flags.

Flag-flying days are different from Flag Day holidays that celebrate the flag itself and are usually held just one day per year. Flag-flying days normally occur multiple times each year to celebrate national holidays or other occasions.

== By country ==
For flag flying days in various countries, see:

- Flag-flying days in Estonia
- Flag-flying days in Finland
- Flag-flying days in Germany
- Flag-flying days in Lithuania
- Flag-flying days in Mexico
- Flag-flying days in the Netherlands
- Flag-flying days in Norway
- Flag-flying days in Sweden
- Flag-flying days in the United Kingdom
- Flag-flying days in the United States

== See also ==
- Dance of Flags, Israeli celebration
- Flag Day
