= Flags of Norwegian subdivisions =

Most of the Norwegian counties and municipalities have their own flag. They are based on the respective coat of arms of the subdivision. However they are seldom used. Most public buildings and private homes use the National flag.

== Flags of Norwegian counties ==
Flag of Agder

Flag of Akershus

Flag of Buskerud

Flag of Finnmark

Flag of Innlandet

Flag of Møre og Romsdal

Flag of Nordland

Flag of Oslo

Flag of Rogaland

Flag of Telemark

Flag of Troms

Flag of Trøndelag

Flag of Vestfold

Flag of Vestland

Flag of Østfold

=== Flags of former Norwegian counties ===
Flag of Aust-Agder

Flag of Hedmark

Flag of Hordaland

Flag of Nord-Trøndelag

Flag of Oppland

Flag of Sogn og Fjordane

Flag of Sør-Trøndelag

Flag of Troms og Finnmark

Flag of Vest-Agder

Flag of Vestfold og Telemark

Coat of Arms of Viken

== Flags of Norwegian municipalities ==
This is just a number of municipalities with their own flags, there are however many more municipalities that do use a flag.

=== Agder ===
Flags of municipalities in Agder county.

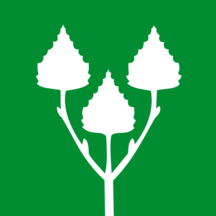
Flag of Birkenes Municipality

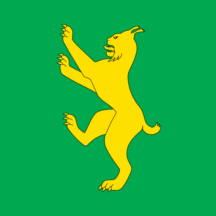
Flag of Bygland Municipality

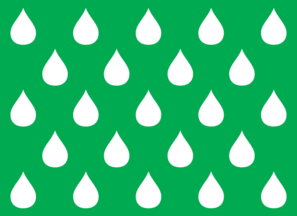
Flag of Bykle Municipality

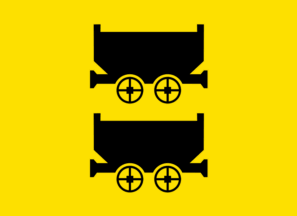
Flag of Evje og Hornnes Municipality

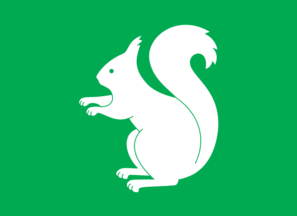
Flag of Froland Municipality

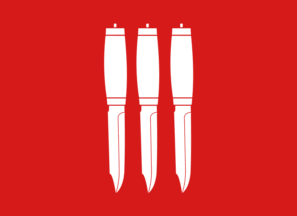
Flag of Gjerstad Municipality

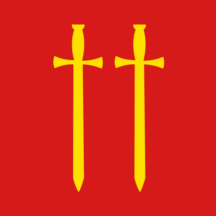
Flag of Hægebostad Municipality

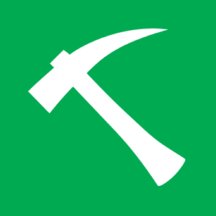
Flag of Iveland Municipality

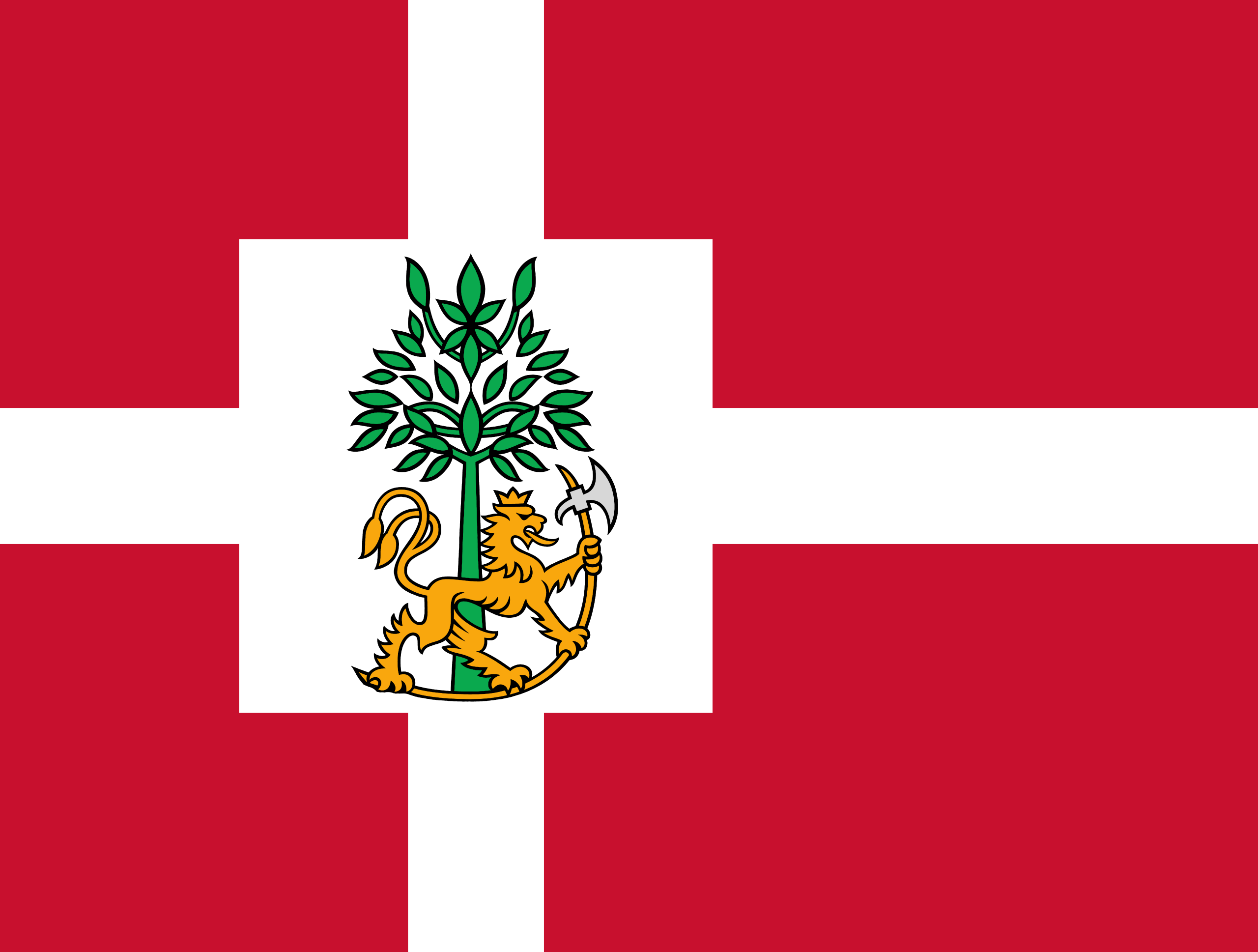
Historic flag of Kristiansand (town) (1600s–)

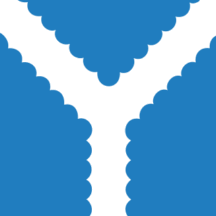
Flag of Kvinesdal Municipality

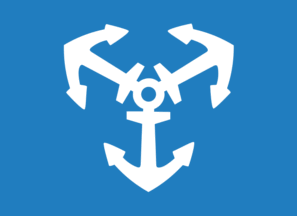
Flag of Lillesand Municipality

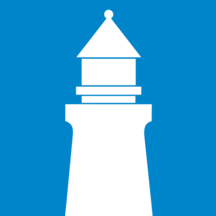
Flag of Lindesnes Municipality

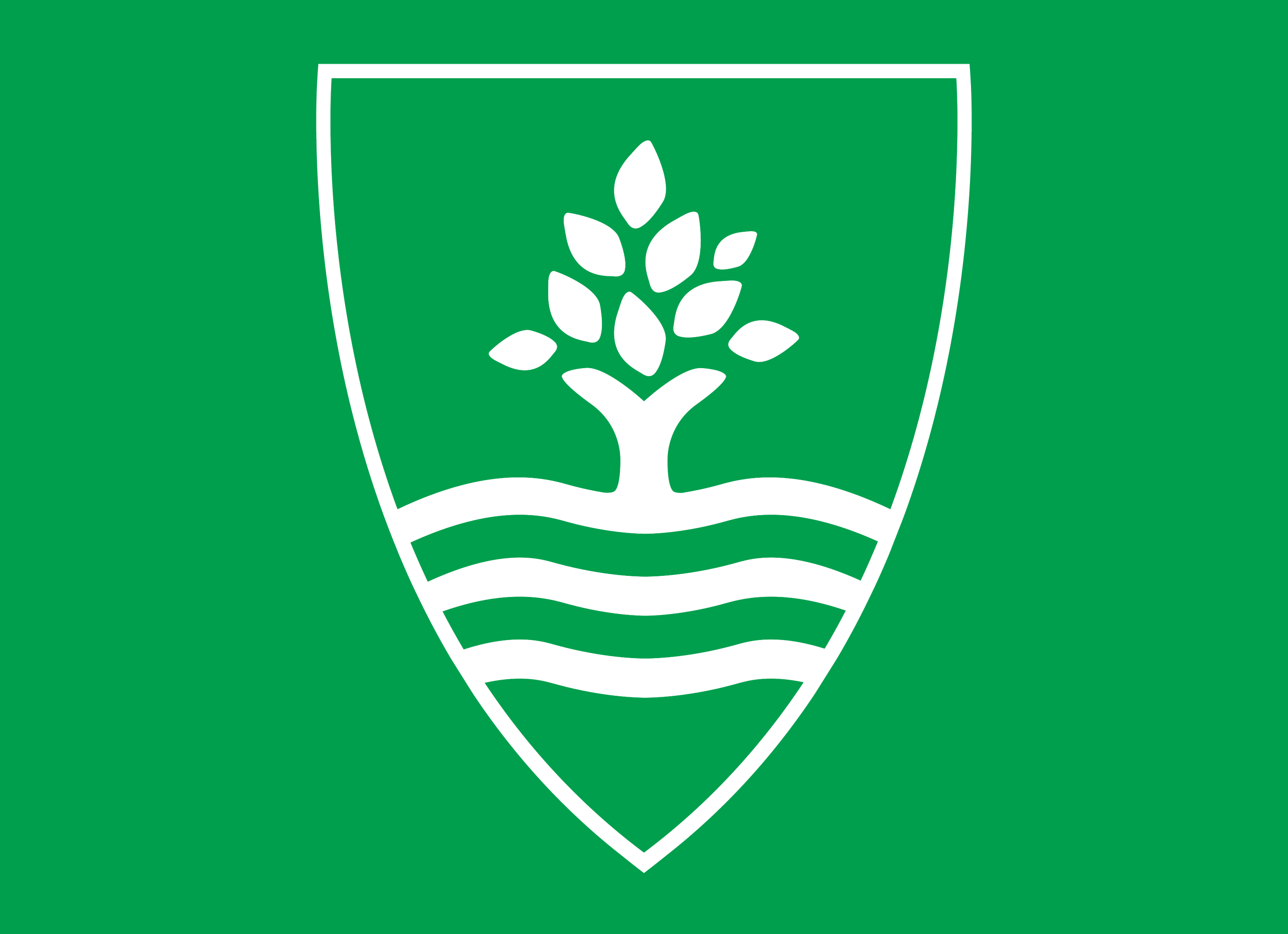
Flag of Lyngdal Municipality

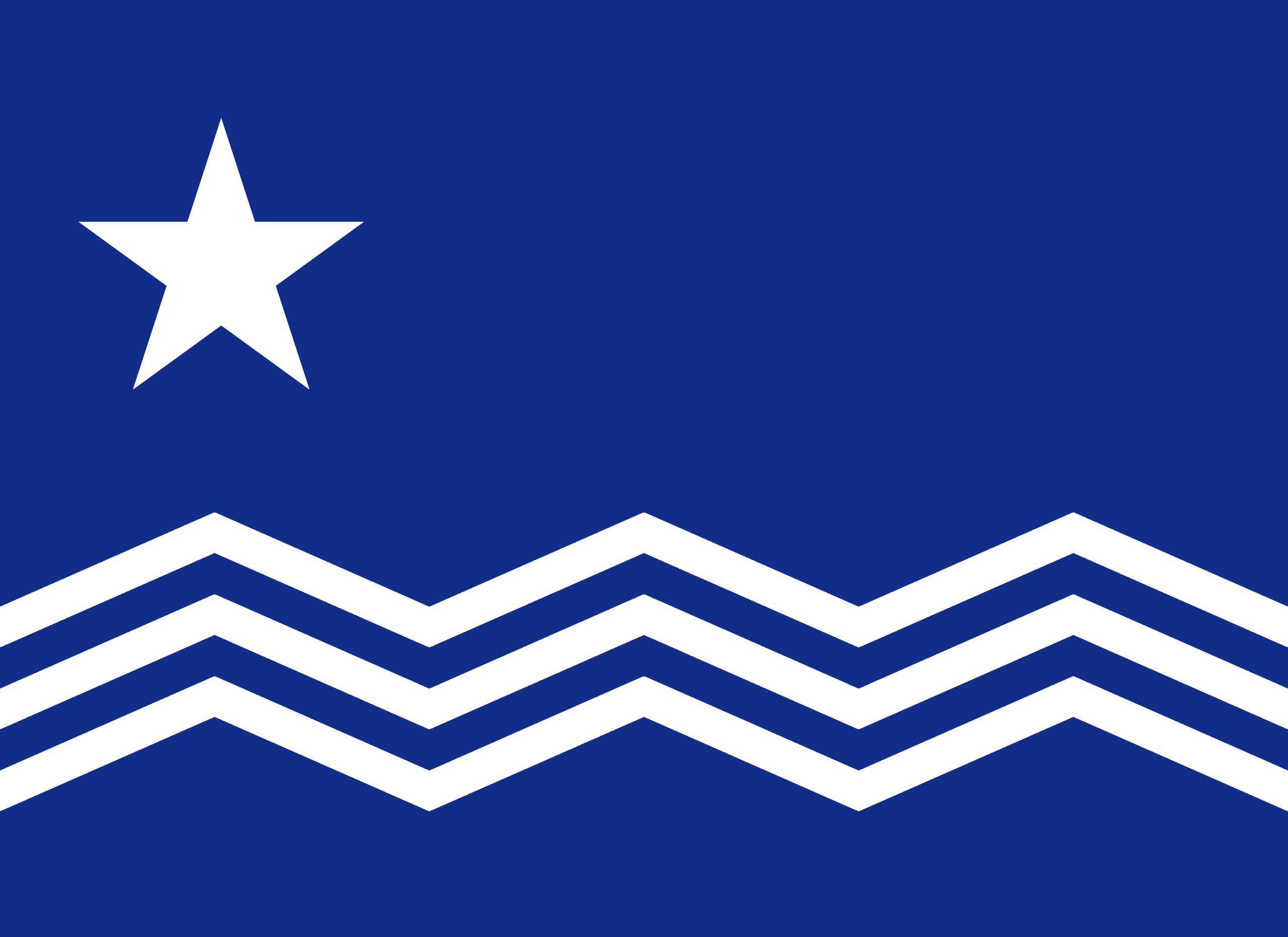
Flag of Risør Municipality

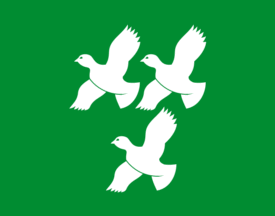
Flag of Sirdal Municipality

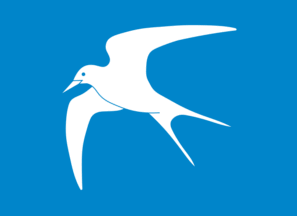
Flag of Tvedestrand Municipality

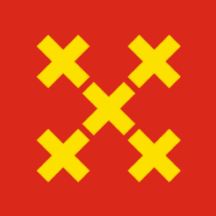
Flag of Valle Municipality

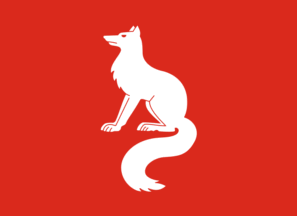
Flag of Vegårshei Municipality

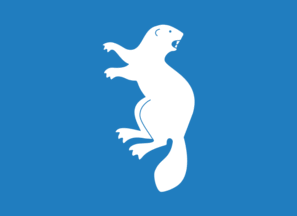
Flag of Åmli Municipality

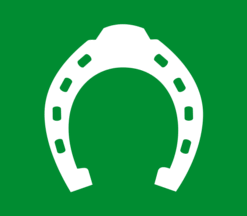
Flag of Åseral Municipality

=== Akershus ===
Flags of municipalities in Akershus county.

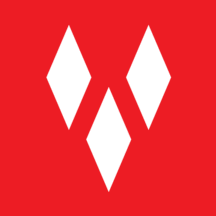
Flag of Asker Municipality

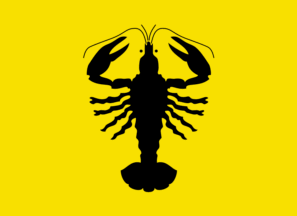
Flag of Aurskog-Høland Municipality

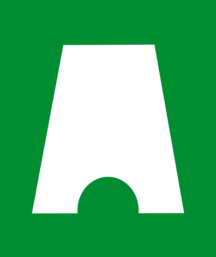
Flag of Bærum Municipality

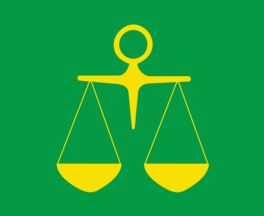
Flag of Eidsvoll Municipality

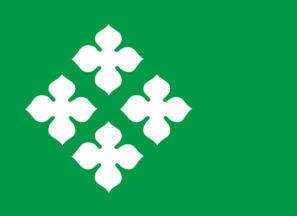
Flag of Enebakk Municipality

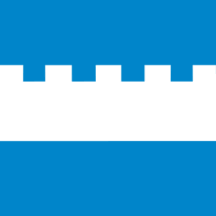
Flag of Frogn Municipality

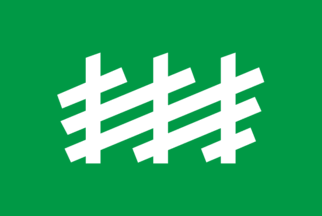
Flag of Gjerdrum Municipality

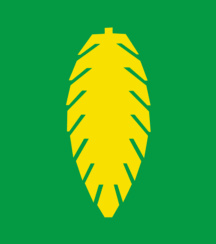
Flag of Hurdal Municipality

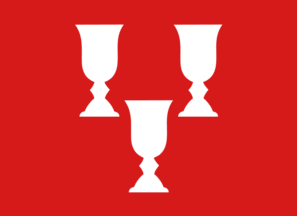
Flag of Jevnaker Municipality

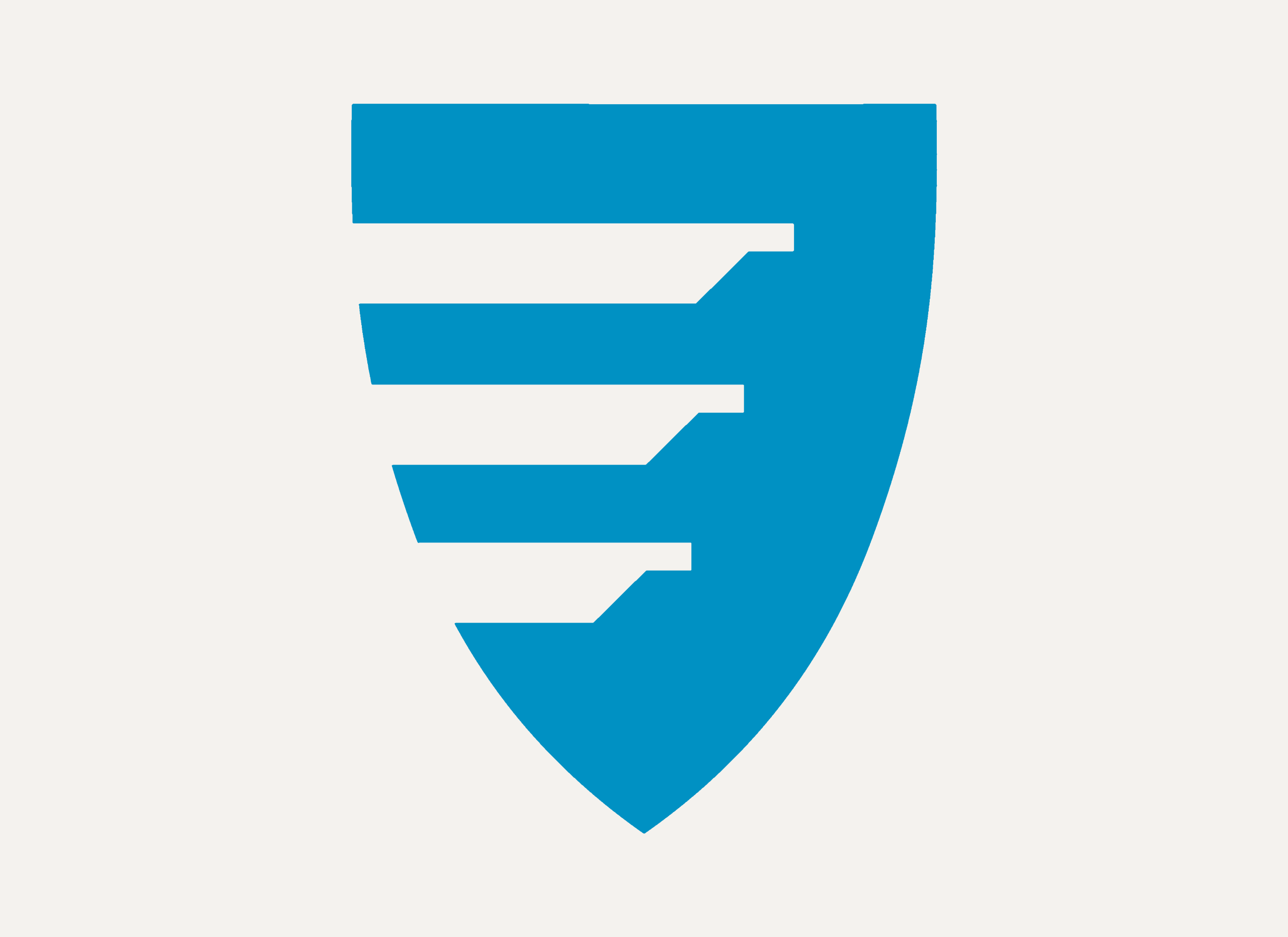
Flag of Lillestrøm Municipality

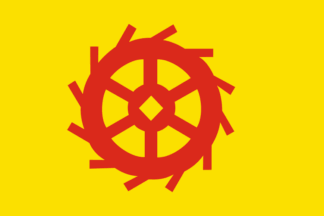
Flag of Lørenskog Municipality

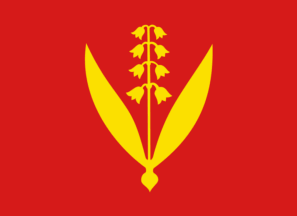
Flag of Lunner Municipality

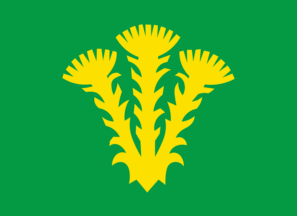
Flag of Nannestad Municipality

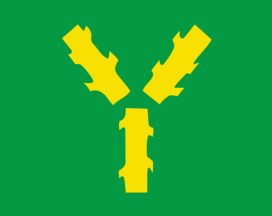
Flag of Nes Municipality

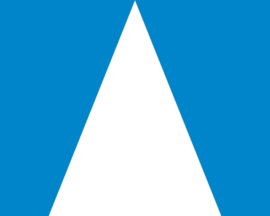
Flag of Nesodden Municipality

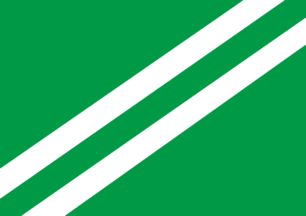
Flag of Nittedal Municipality

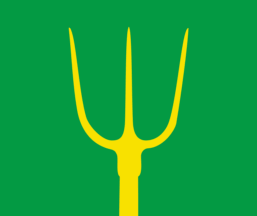
Flag of Rælingen Municipality

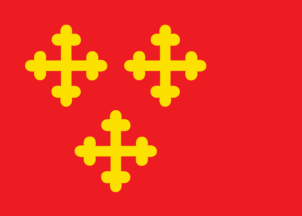
Flag of Vestby Municipality

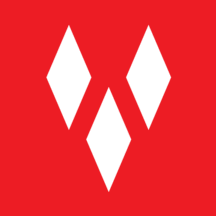
Flag of Ås Municipality

=== Buskerud ===
Flags of municipalities in Buskerud county.

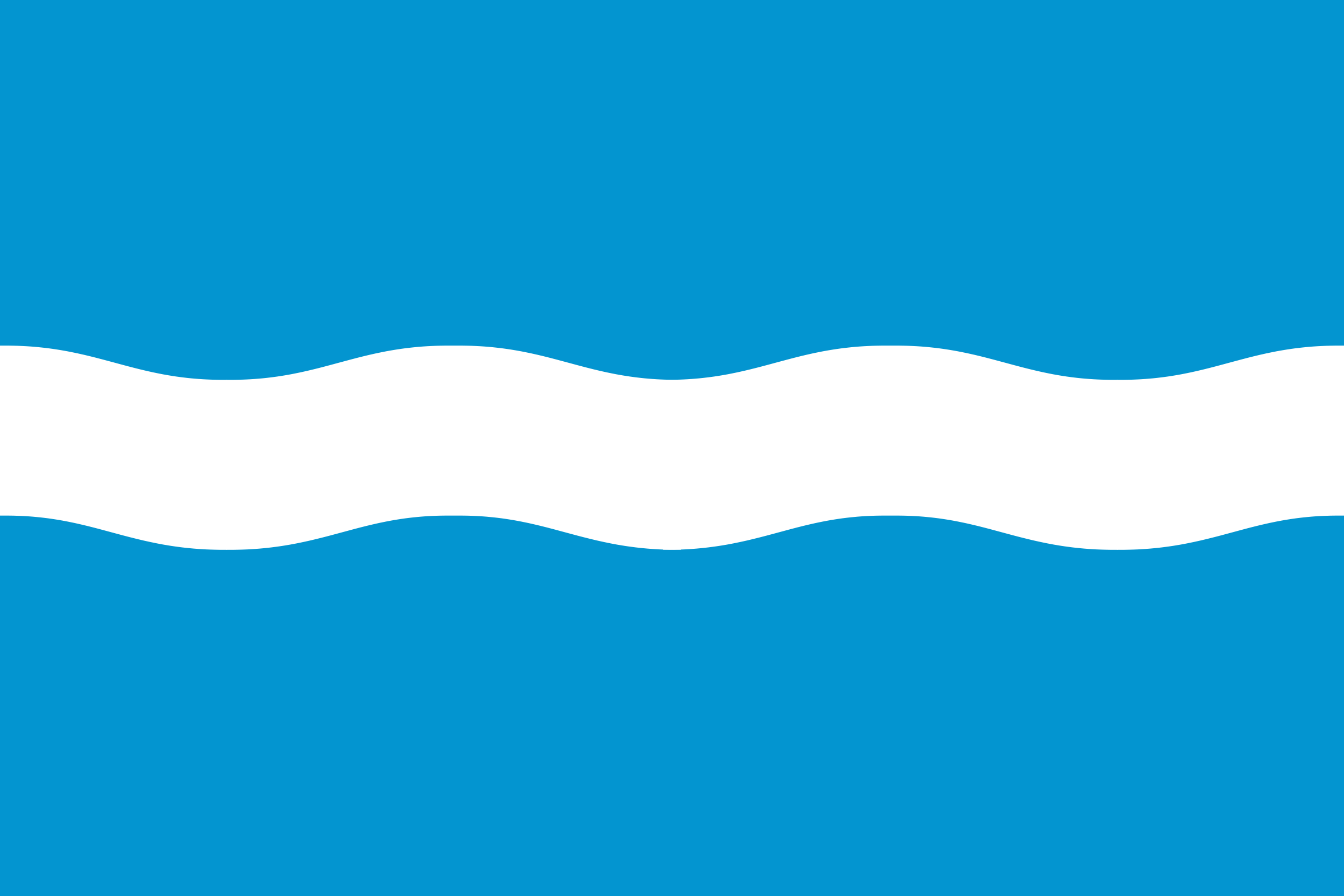
Flag of Drammen Municipality

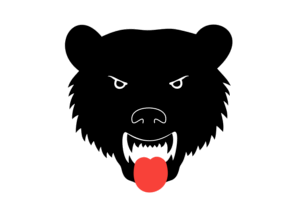
Flag of Flå Municipality

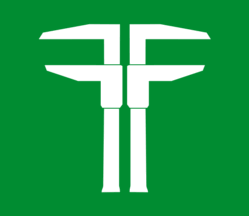
Flag of Flesberg Municipality

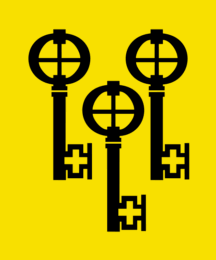
Flag of Gol Municipality

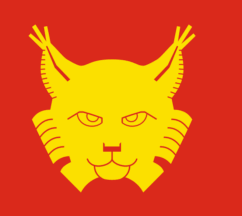
Flag of Hemsedal Municipality

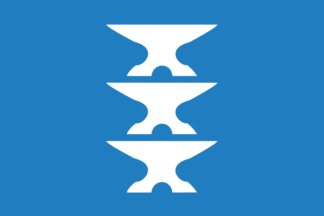
Flag of Hol Municipality

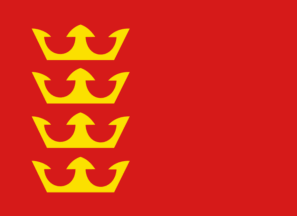
Flag of Hole Municipality

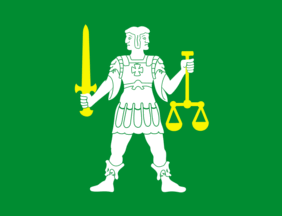
Flag of Kongsberg Municipality

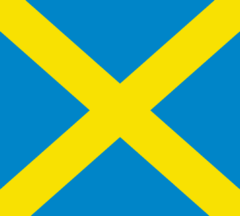
Flag of Krødsherad Municipality

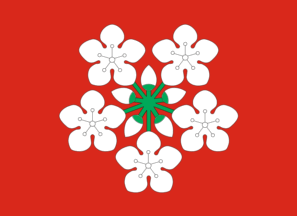
Flag of Lier Municipality

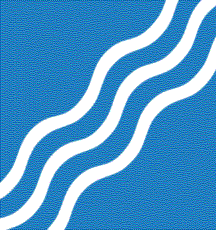
Flag of Modum Municipality

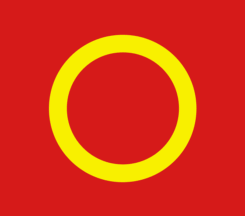
Flag of Ringerike Municipality

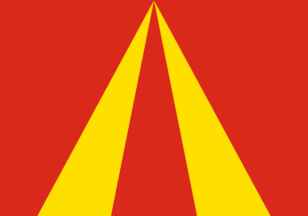
Flag of Rollag Municipality

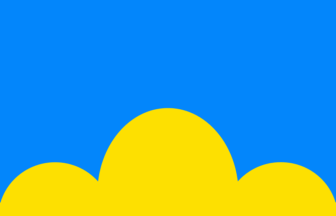
Flag of Sigdal Municipality

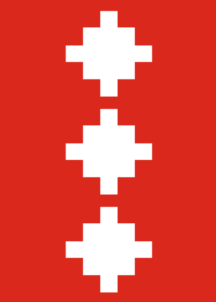
Flag of Ål Municipality

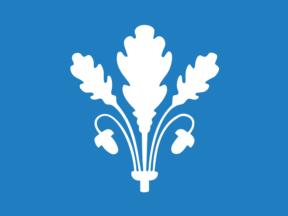
Flag of Øvre Eiker Municipality

=== Finnmark ===
Flags of municipalities in Finnmark county.

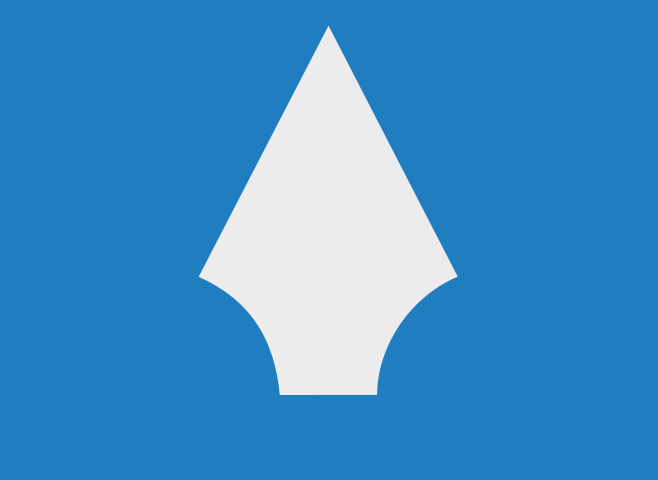
Flag of Alta Municipality

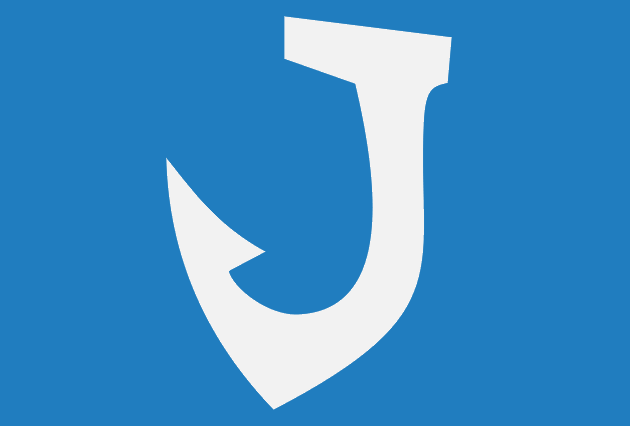
Flag of Båtsfjord Municipality

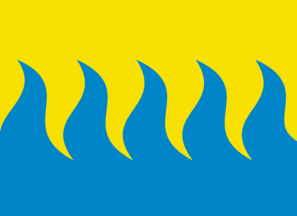
Flag of Berlevåg Municipality

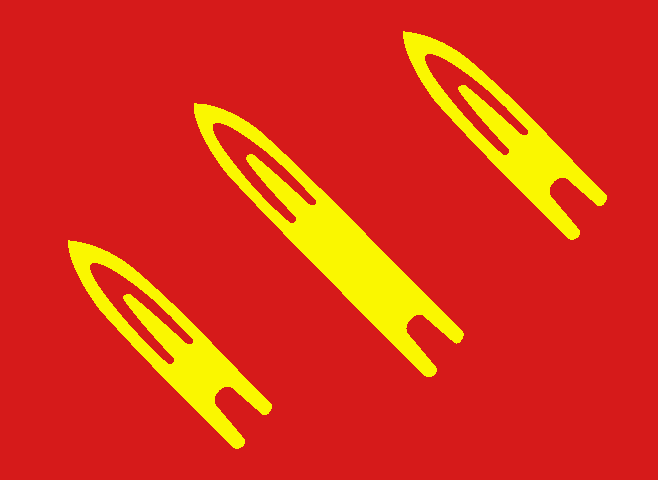
Flag of Gamvik Municipality

Flag of Hammerfest Municipality

Flag of Hasvik Municipality

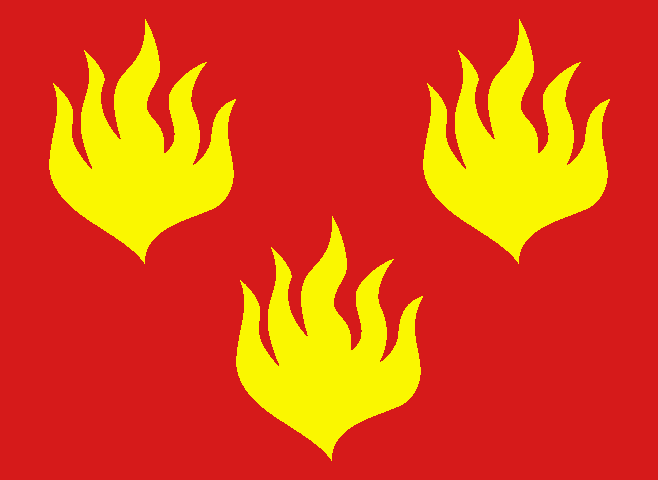
Flag of Karasjok Municipality

Flag of Kautokeino Municipality

Flag of Lebesby Municipality

Flag of Loppa Municipality

Flag of Måsøy Municipality

Flag of Nesseby Municipality

Flag of Nordkapp Municipality

Flag of Porsanger Municipality

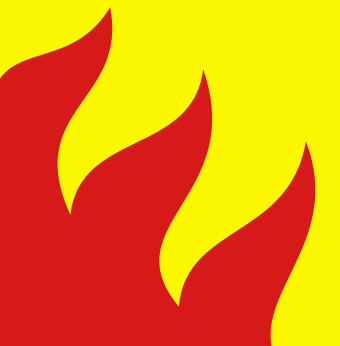
Flag of Sør-Varanger Municipality

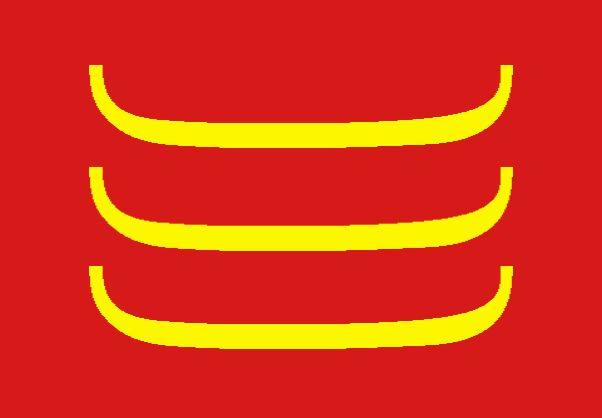
Flag of Tana Municipality

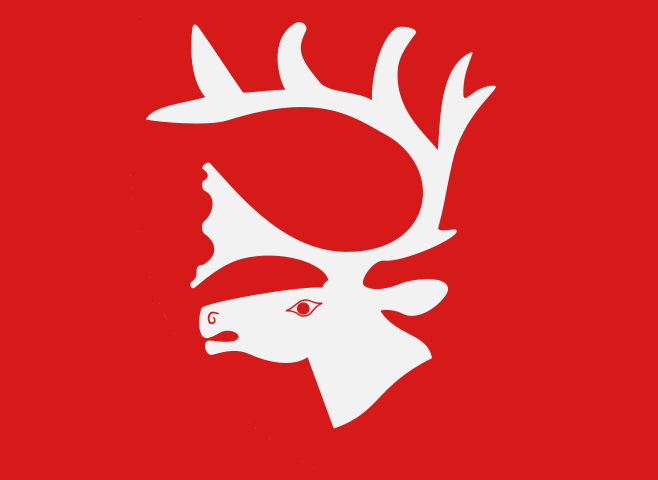
Flag of Vadsø Municipality

=== Innlandet ===
Flags of municipalities in Innlandet county.

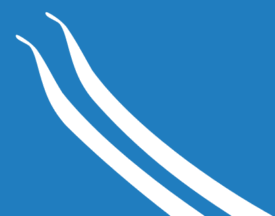
Flag of Alvdal Municipality

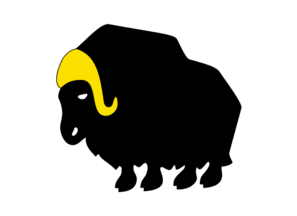
Flag of Dovre Municipality

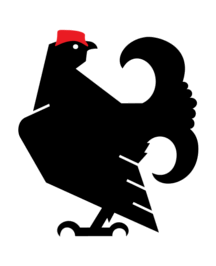
Flag of Eidskog Municipality

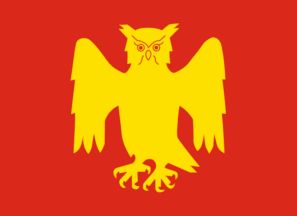
Flag of Elverum Municipality

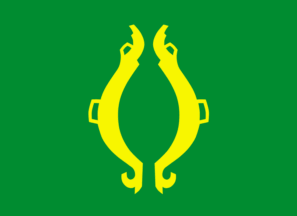
Flag of Engerdal Municipality

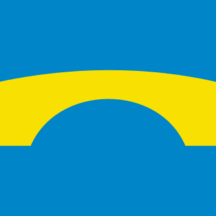
Flag of Etnedal Municipality

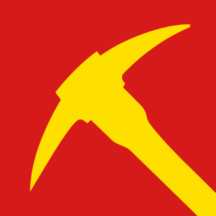
Flag of Folldal Municipality

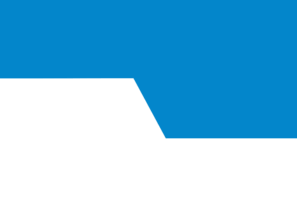
Flag of Gausdal Municipality

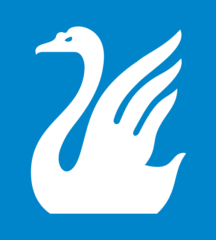
Flag of Gjøvik Municipality

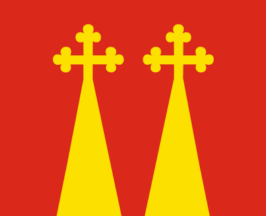
Flag of Gran Municipality

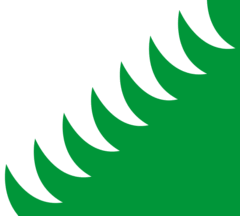
Flag of Grue Municipality

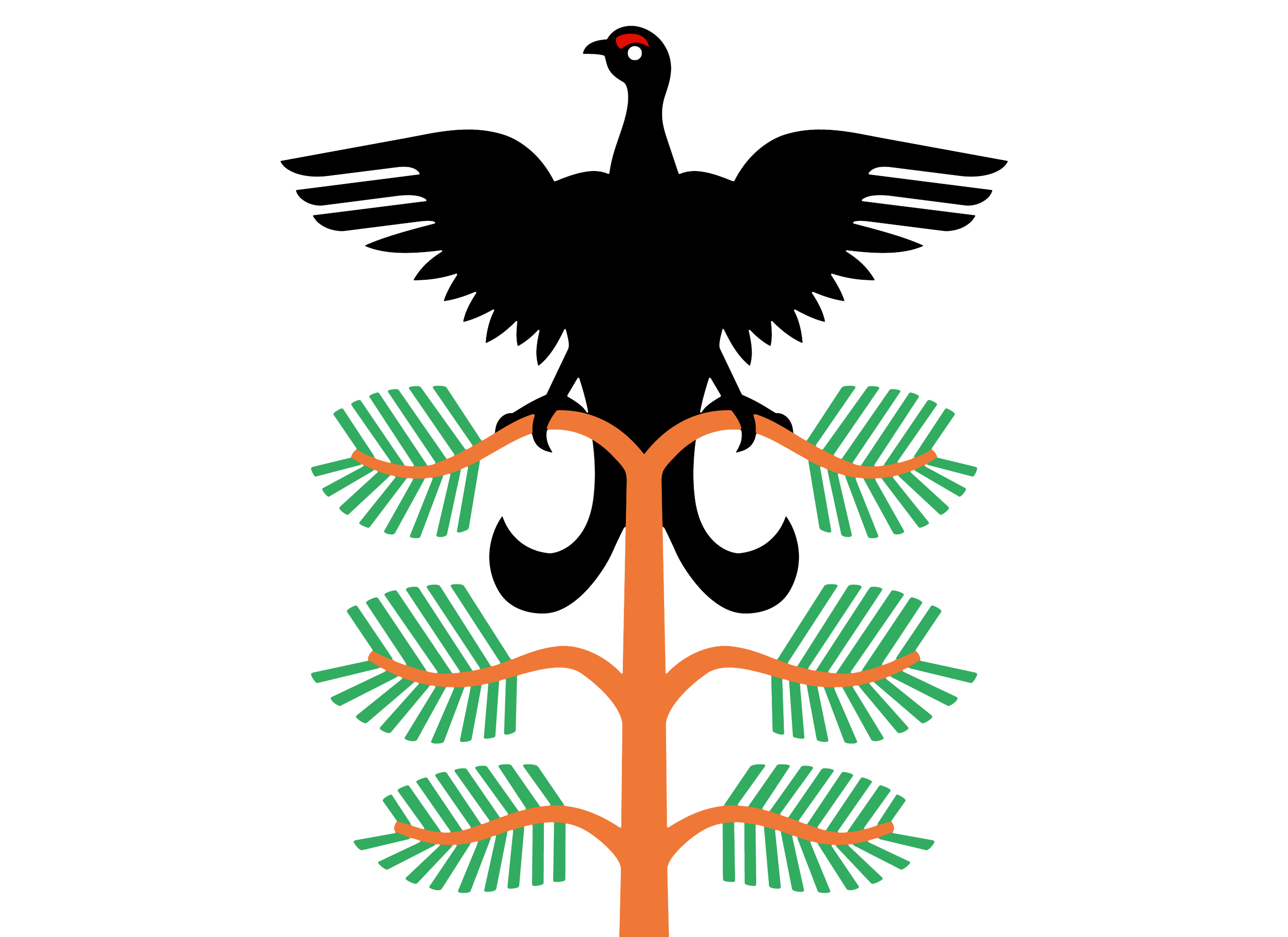
Flag of Hamar Municipality

Flag of Lesja Municipality

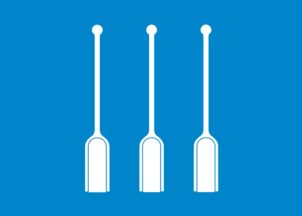
Flag of Lom Municipality

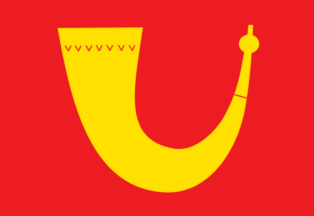
Flag of Løten Municipality

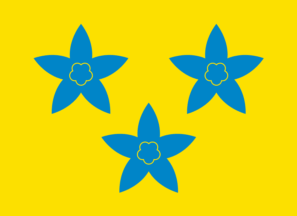
Flag of Nord-Aurdal Municipality

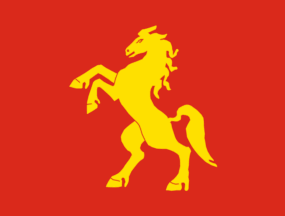
Flag of Nord-Fron Municipality

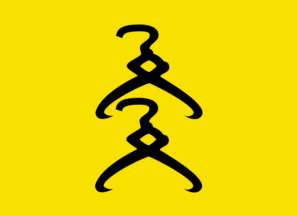
Flag of Nord-Odal Municipality

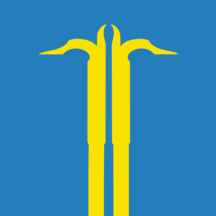
Flag of Nordre Land Municipality

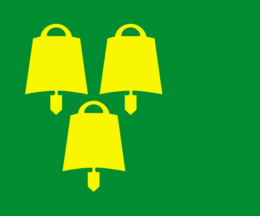
Flag of Os Municipality

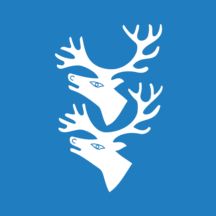
Flag of Rendalen Municipality

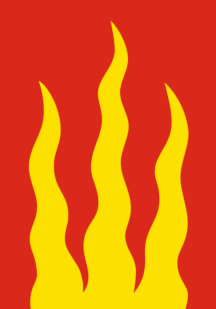
Flag of Ringebu Municipality

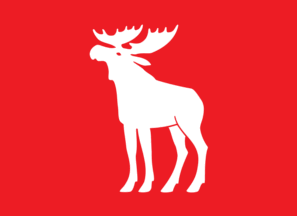
Flag of Ringsaker Municipality

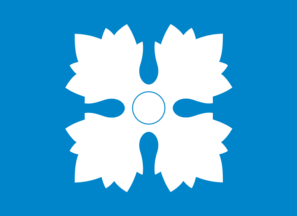
Flag of Skjåk Municipality

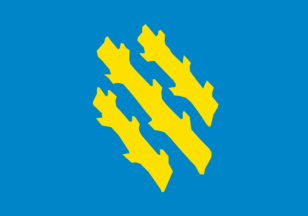
Flag of Søndre Land Municipality

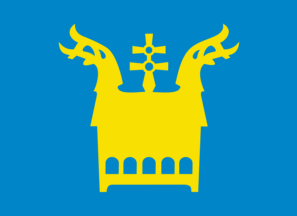
Flag of Sør-Aurdal Municipality

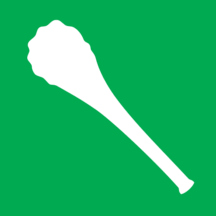
Flag of Sør-Fron Municipality

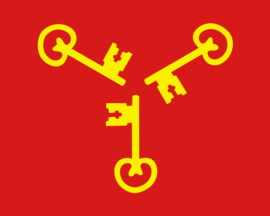
Flag of Sør-Odal Municipality

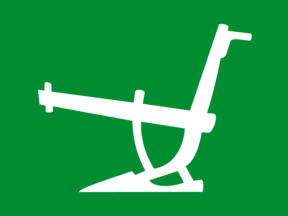
Flag of Stange Municipality

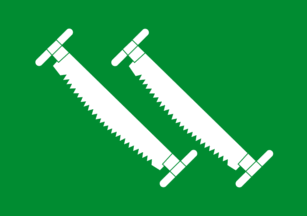
Flag of Stor-Elvdal Municipality

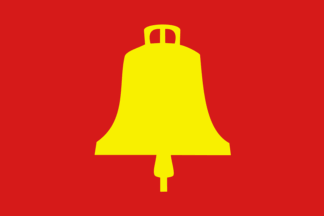
Flag of Tolga Municipality

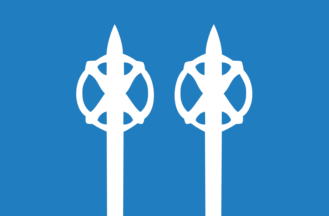
Flag of Trysil Municipality

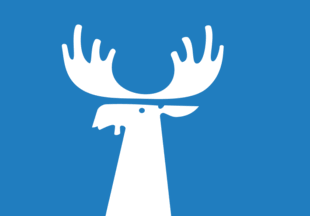
Flag of Tynset Municipality

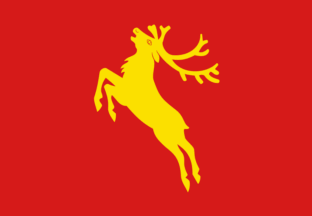
Flag of Vågå Municipality

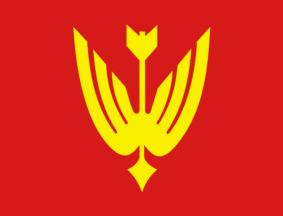
Flag of Våler Municipality

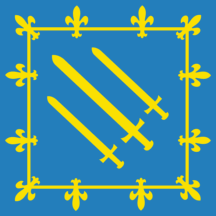
Flag of Vang Municipality

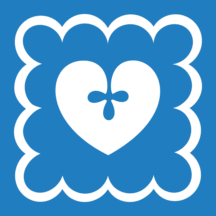
Flag of Vestre Slidre Municipality

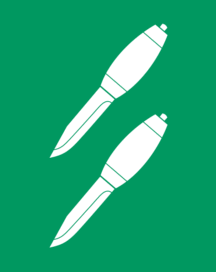
Flag of Vestre Toten Municipality

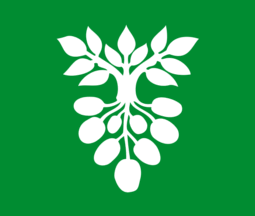
Flag of Østre Toten Municipality

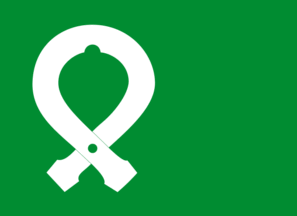
Flag of Øyer Municipality

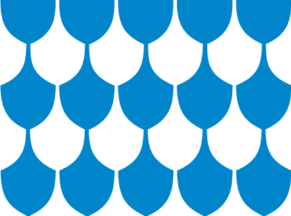
Flag of Øystre Slidre Municipality

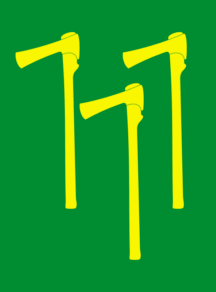
Flag of Åmot Municipality

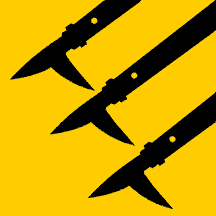
Flag of Åsnes Municipality

=== Møre og Romsdal ===
Flags of municipalities in Møre og Romsdal county.

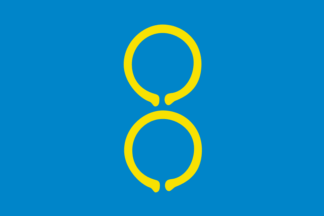
Flag of Aukra Municipality

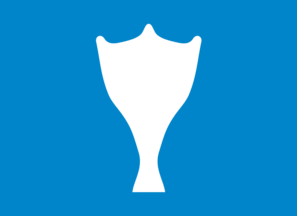
Flag of Aure Municipality

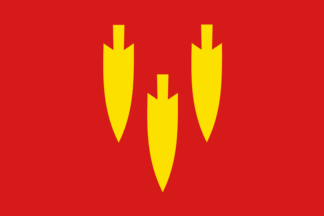
Flag of Averøy Municipality

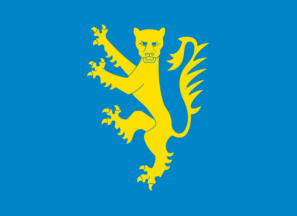
Flag of Giske Municipality

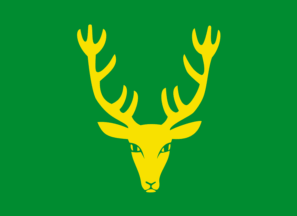
Flag of Gjemnes Municipality

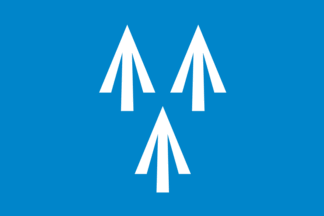
Flag of Hareid Municipality

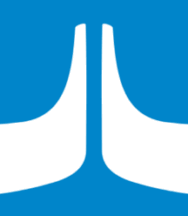
Flag of Herøy Municipality

Flag of Molde Municipality

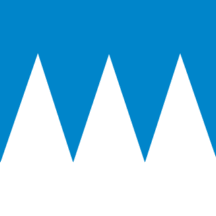
Flag of Rauma Municipality

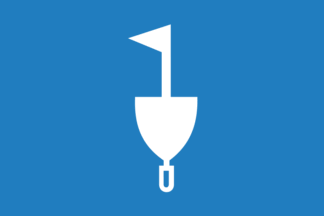
Flag of Sande Municipality

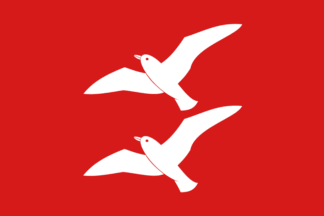
Flag of Smøla Municipality

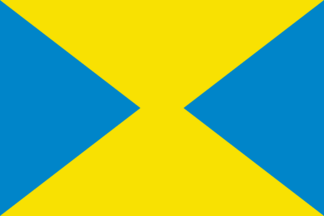
Flag of Stranda Municipality

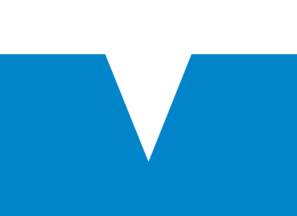
Flag of Sula Municipality

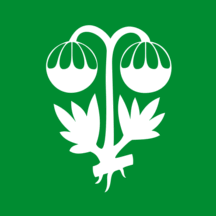
Flag of Sunndal Municipality

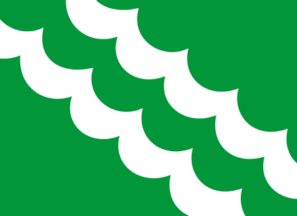
Flag of Surnadal Municipality

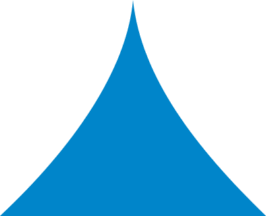
Flag of Sykkylven Municipality

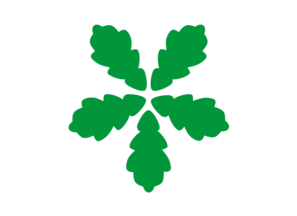
Flag of Tingvoll Municipality

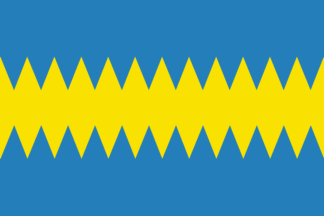
Flag of Ulstein Municipality

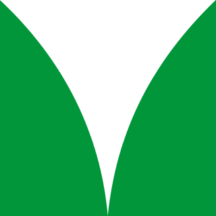
Flag of Vanylven Municipality

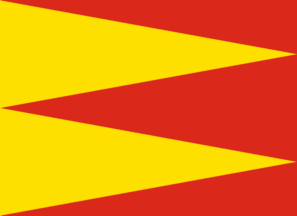
Flag of Vestnes Municipality

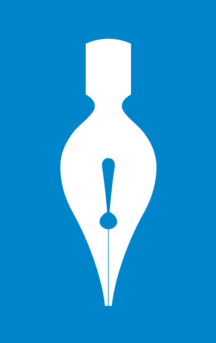
Former flag of Volda Municipality

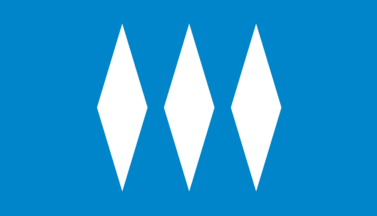
Flag of Ørsta Municipality

=== Nordland ===
Flags of municipalities in Nordland county.

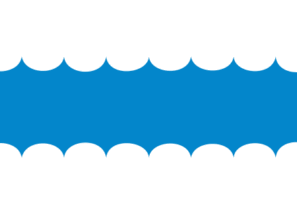
Flag of Alstahaug Municipality

Flag of Andøy Municipality

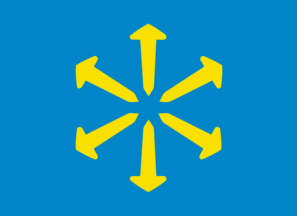
Flag of Bindal Municipality

Flag of Bodø Municipality

Flag of Bø Municipality

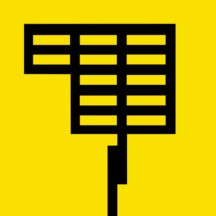
Flag of Brønnøy Municipality

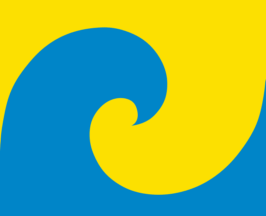
Flag of Dønna Municipality

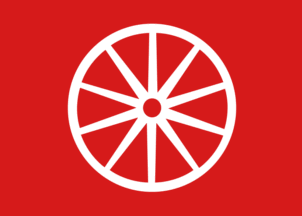
Flag of Evenes Municipality

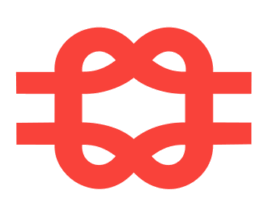
Flag of Fauske Municipality

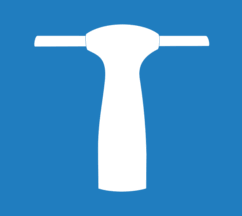
Flag of Flakstad Municipality

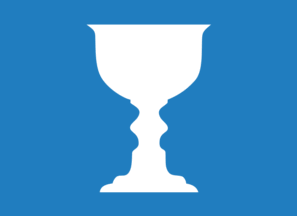
Flag of Gildeskål Municipality

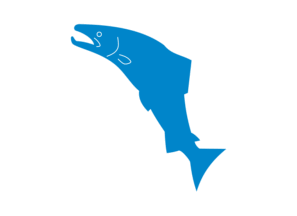
Flag of Grane Municipality

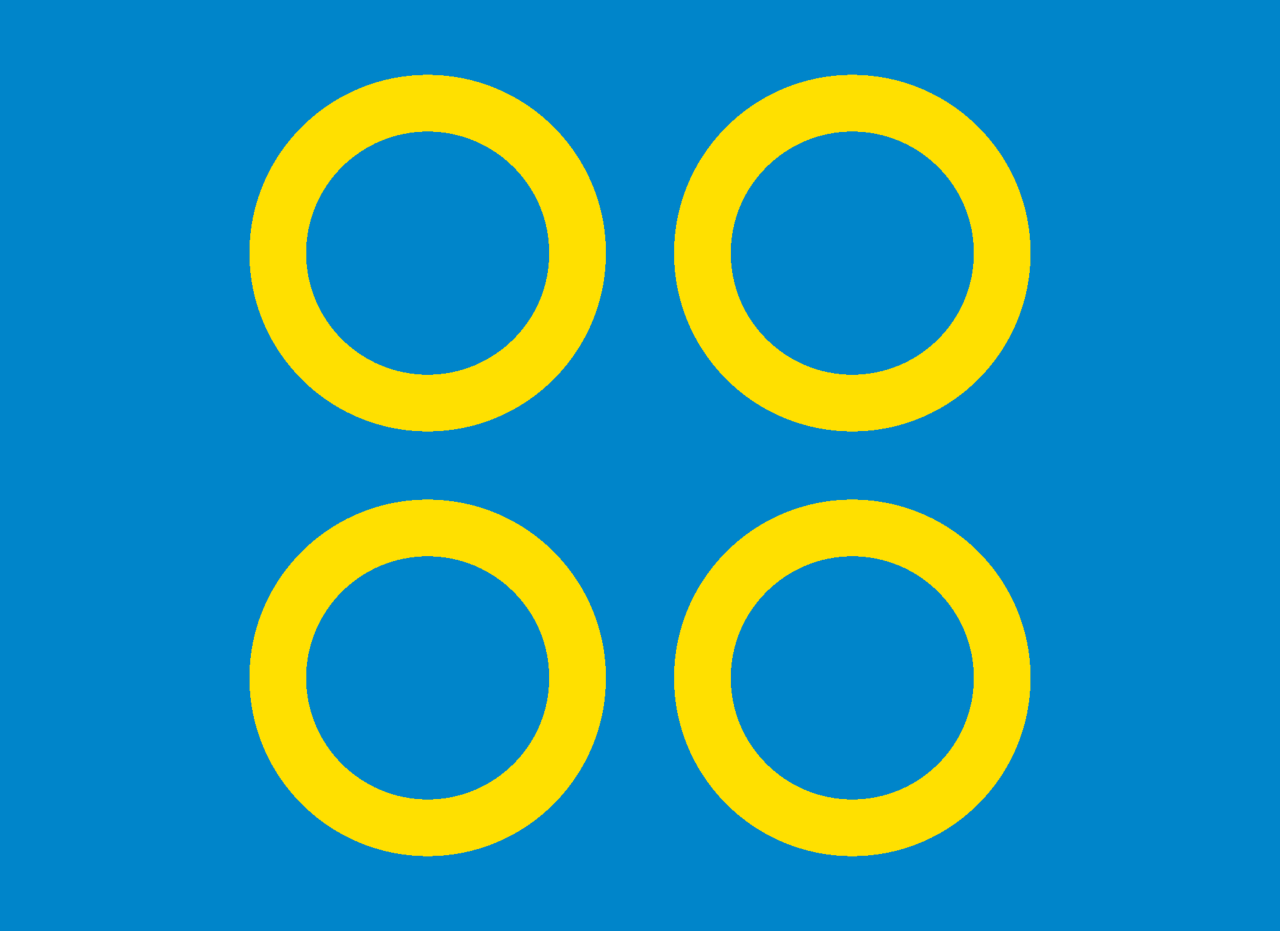
Flag of Hadsel Municipality

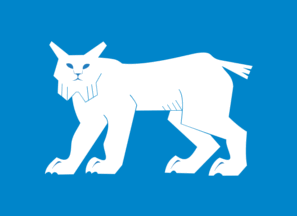
Former flag of Hamarøy Municipality

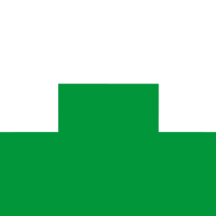
Flag of Hattfjelldal Municipality

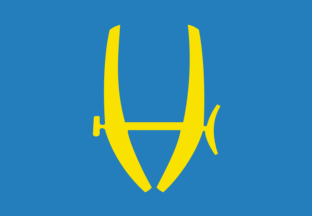
Flag of Hemnes Municipality

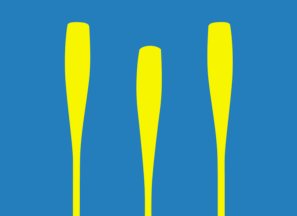
Flag of Herøy Municipality

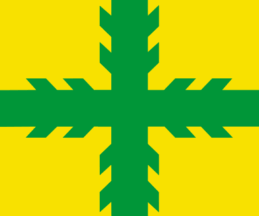
Flag of Leirfjord Municipality

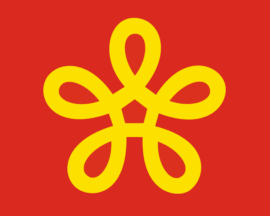
Flag of Lødingen Municipality

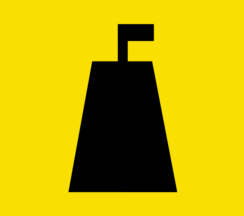
Flag of Lurøy Municipality

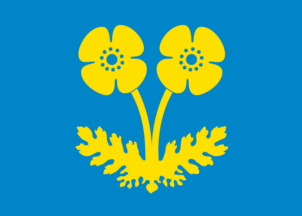
Flag of Meløy Municipality

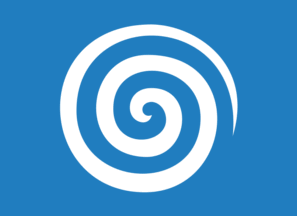
Flag of Moskenes Municipality

Former flag of Narvik Municipality (1951-2019)

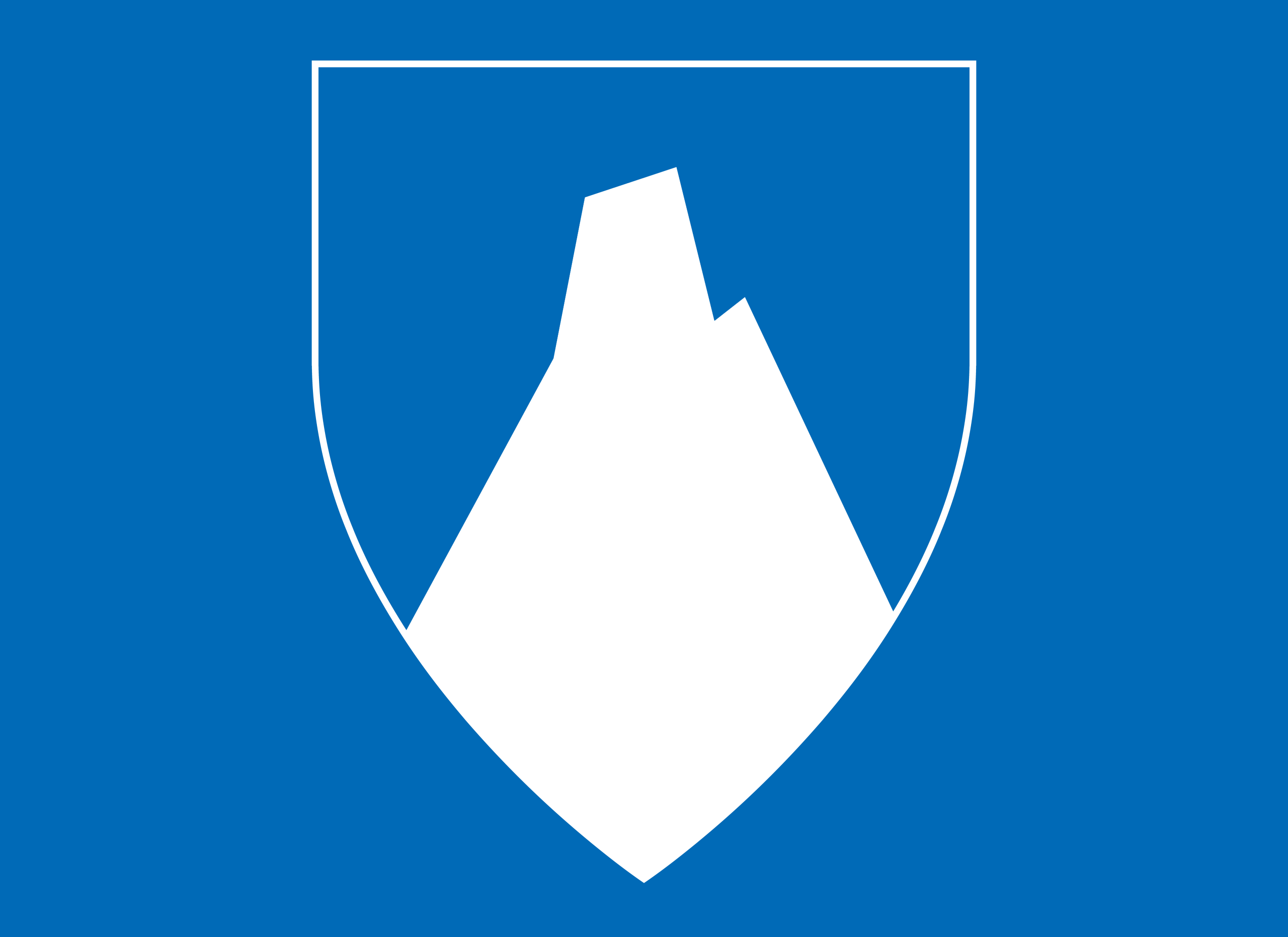
Flag of Narvik Municipality

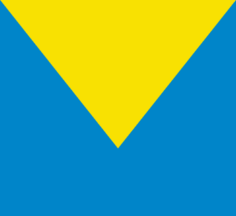
Flag of Nesna Municipality

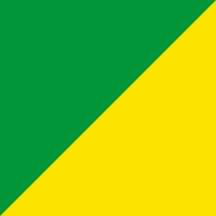
Flag of Rana Municipality

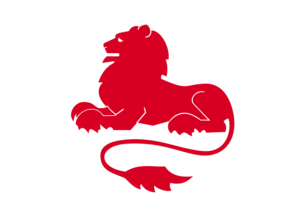
Flag of Rødøy Municipality

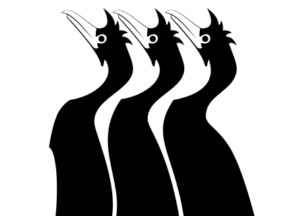
Flag of Røst Municipality

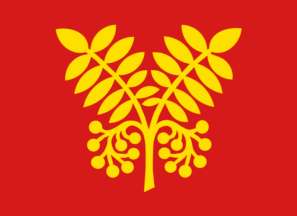
Flag of Saltdal Municipality

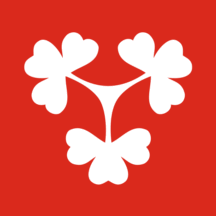
Flag of Sømna Municipality

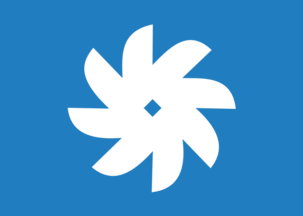
Flag of Sørfold Municipality

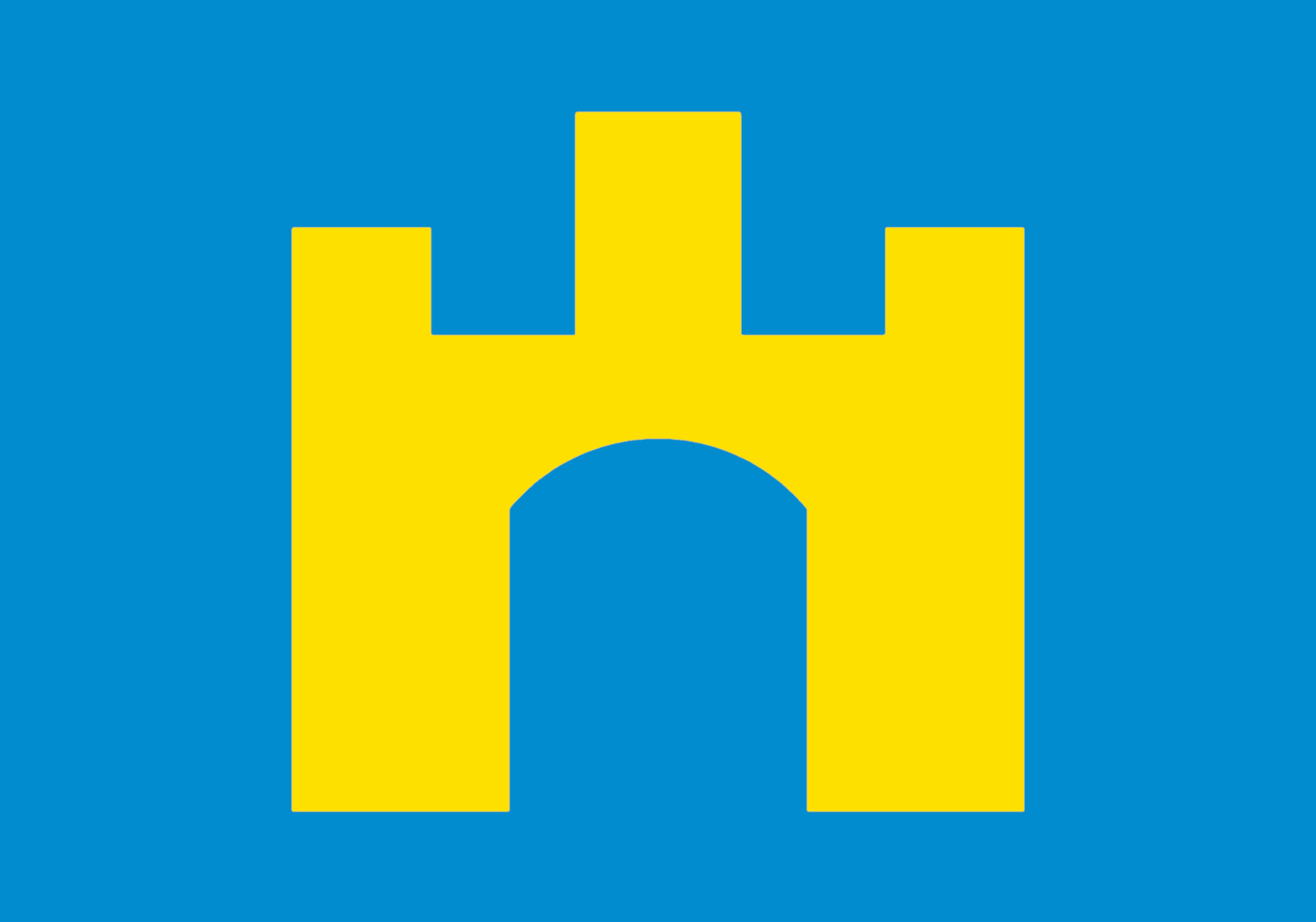
Flag of Sortland Municipality

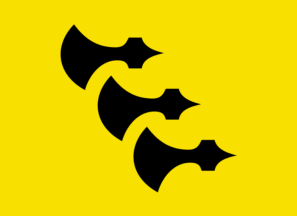
Flag of Steigen Municipality

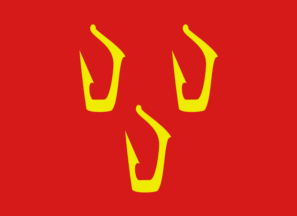
Flag of Træna Municipality

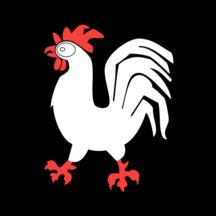
Flag of Vefsn Municipality

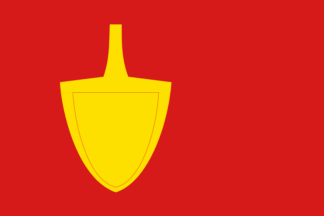
Flag of Vega Municipality

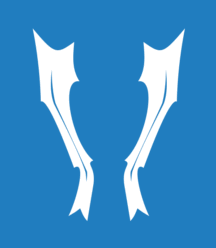
Flag of Vestvågøy Municipality

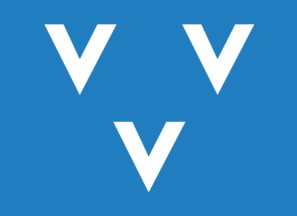
Flag of Vevelstad Municipality

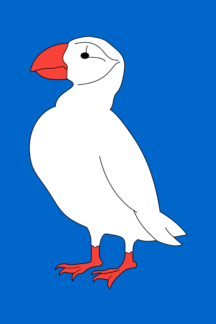
Flag of Værøy Municipality

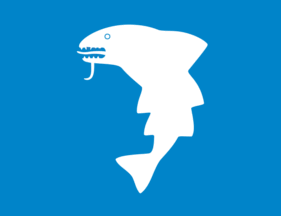
Flag of Vågan Municipality

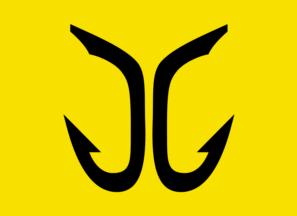
Flag of Øksnes Municipality

=== Oslo ===
Flag of Oslo Municipality

Former flag of Oslo Municipality (1924–2000)

=== Rogaland ===
Flags of municipalities in Rogaland county.

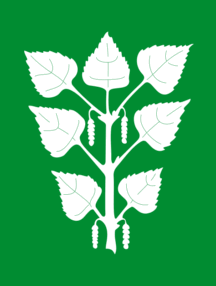
Flag of Bjerkreim Municipality

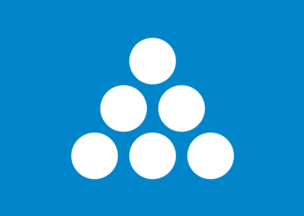
Flag of Bokn Municipality

Flag of Eigersund Municipality

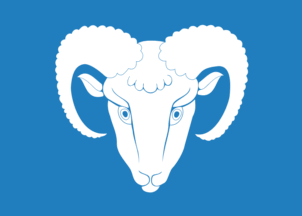
Flag of Gjesdal Municipality

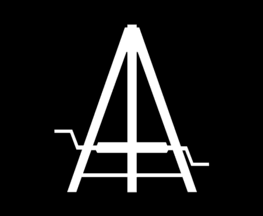
Flag of Hå Municipality

Flag of Haugesund Municipality

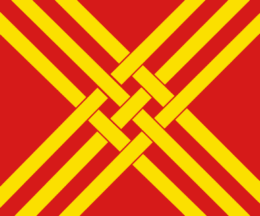
Flag of Hjelmeland Municipality

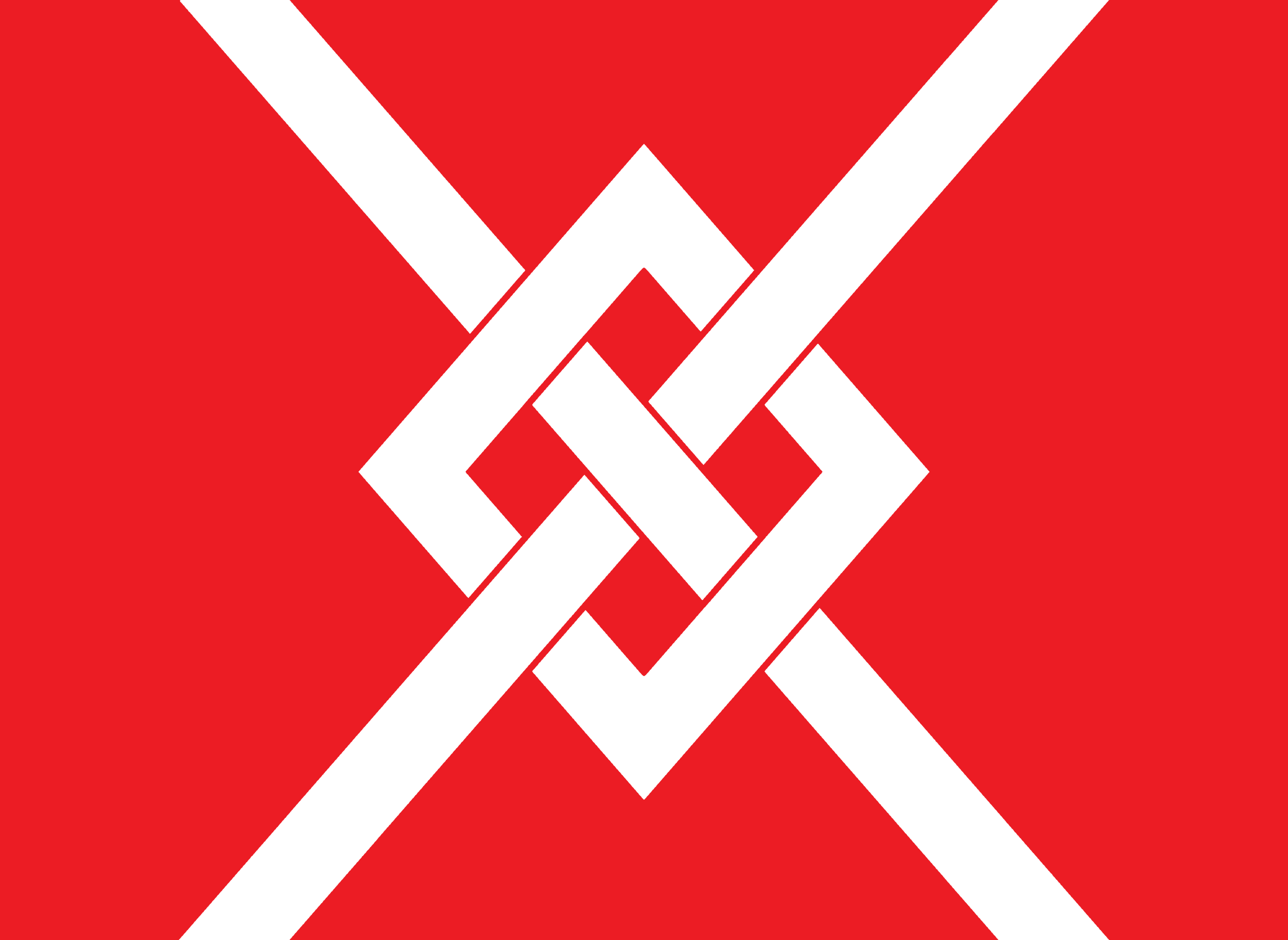
Flag of Karmøy Municipality

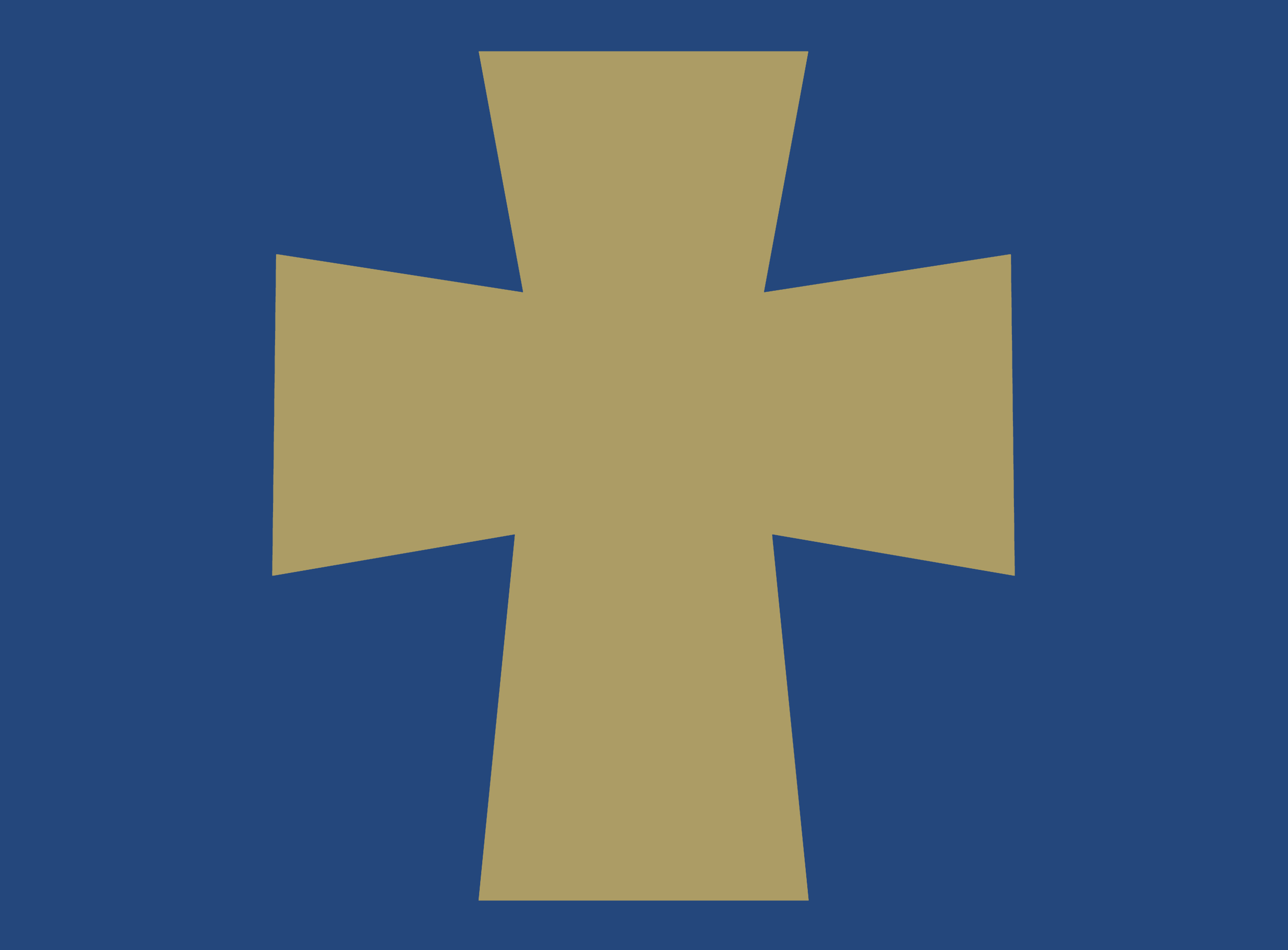
Flag of Klepp Municipality

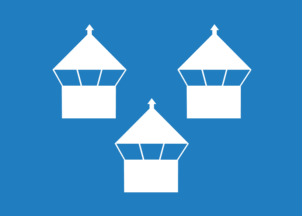
Flag of Kvitsøy Municipality

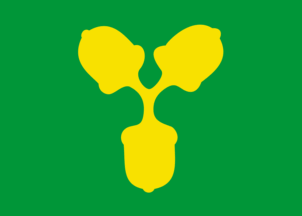
Flag of Lund Municipality

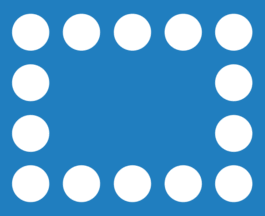
Flag of Randaberg Municipality

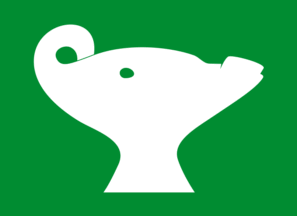
Flag of Sandnes Municipality

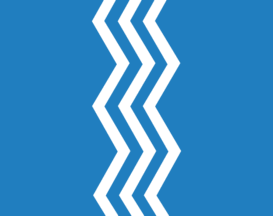
Flag of Sauda Municipality

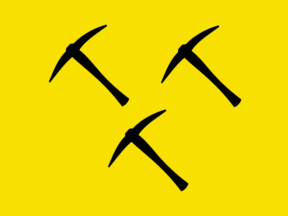
Flag of Sokndal Municipality

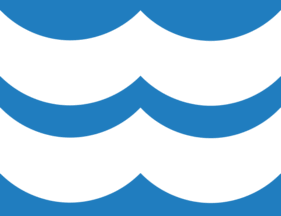
Flag of Sola Municipality

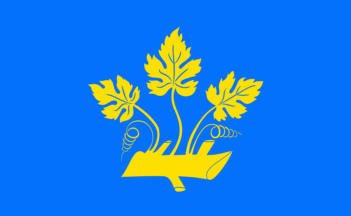
Flag of Stavanger Municipality

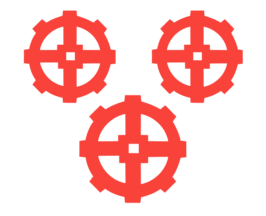
Flag of Strand Municipality

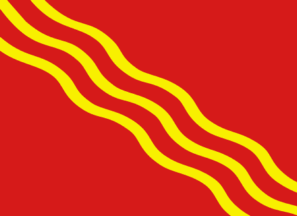
Flag of Suldal Municipality

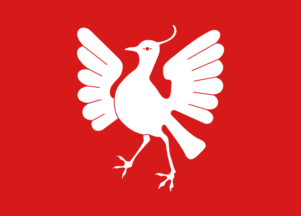
Flag of Time Municipality

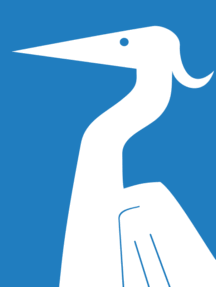
Flag of Tysvær Municipality

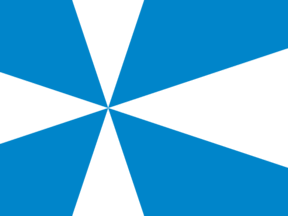
Flag of Utsira Municipality

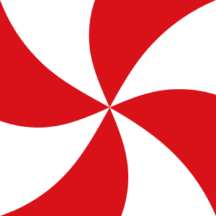
Flag of Vindafjord Municipality

=== Telemark ===
Flags of municipalities in Telemark county.

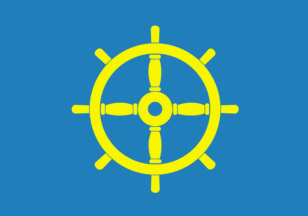
Flag of Bamble Municipality

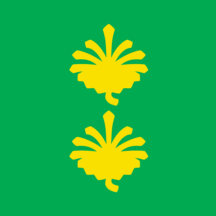
Flag of Drangedal Municipality

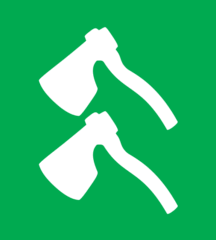
Flag of Fyresdal Municipality

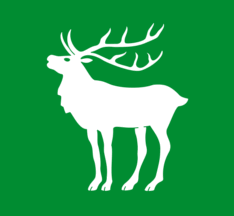
Flag of Hjartdal Municipality

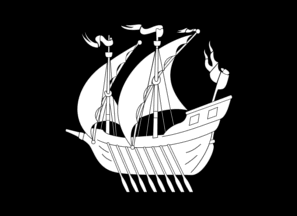
Flag of Kragerø Municipality

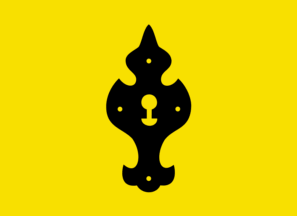
Flag of Kviteseid Municipality

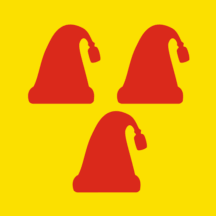
Flag of Nissedal Municipality

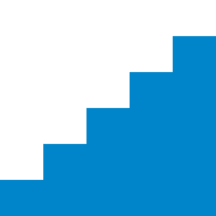
Flag of Nome Municipality

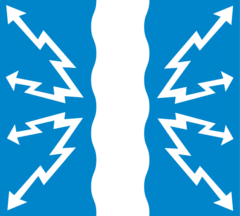
Flag of Notodden Municipality

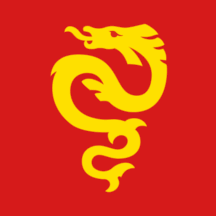
Flag of Seljord Municipality

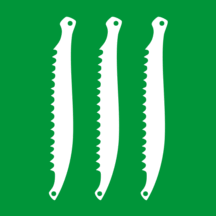
Flag of Siljan Municipality

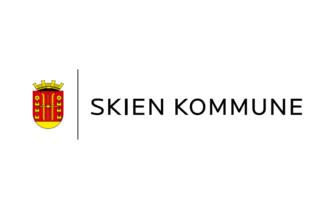
Flag of Skien Municipality

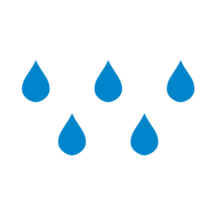
Flag of Tinn Municipality

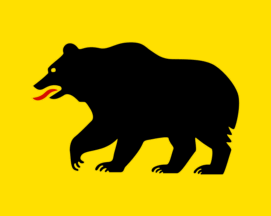
Flag of Tokke Municipality

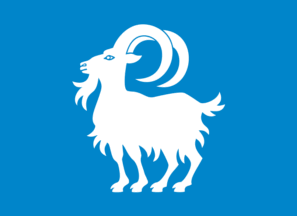
Flag of Vinje Municipality

=== Troms ===
Flags of municipalities in Troms county.

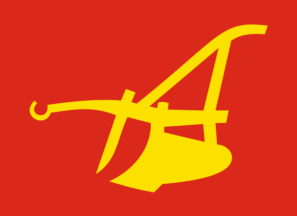
Flag of Balsfjord Municipality

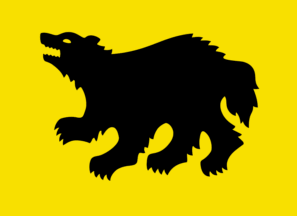
Flag of Bardu Municipality

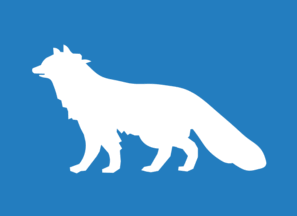
Flag of Dyrøy Municipality

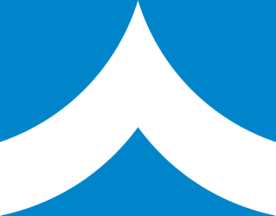
Flag of Gratangen Municipality

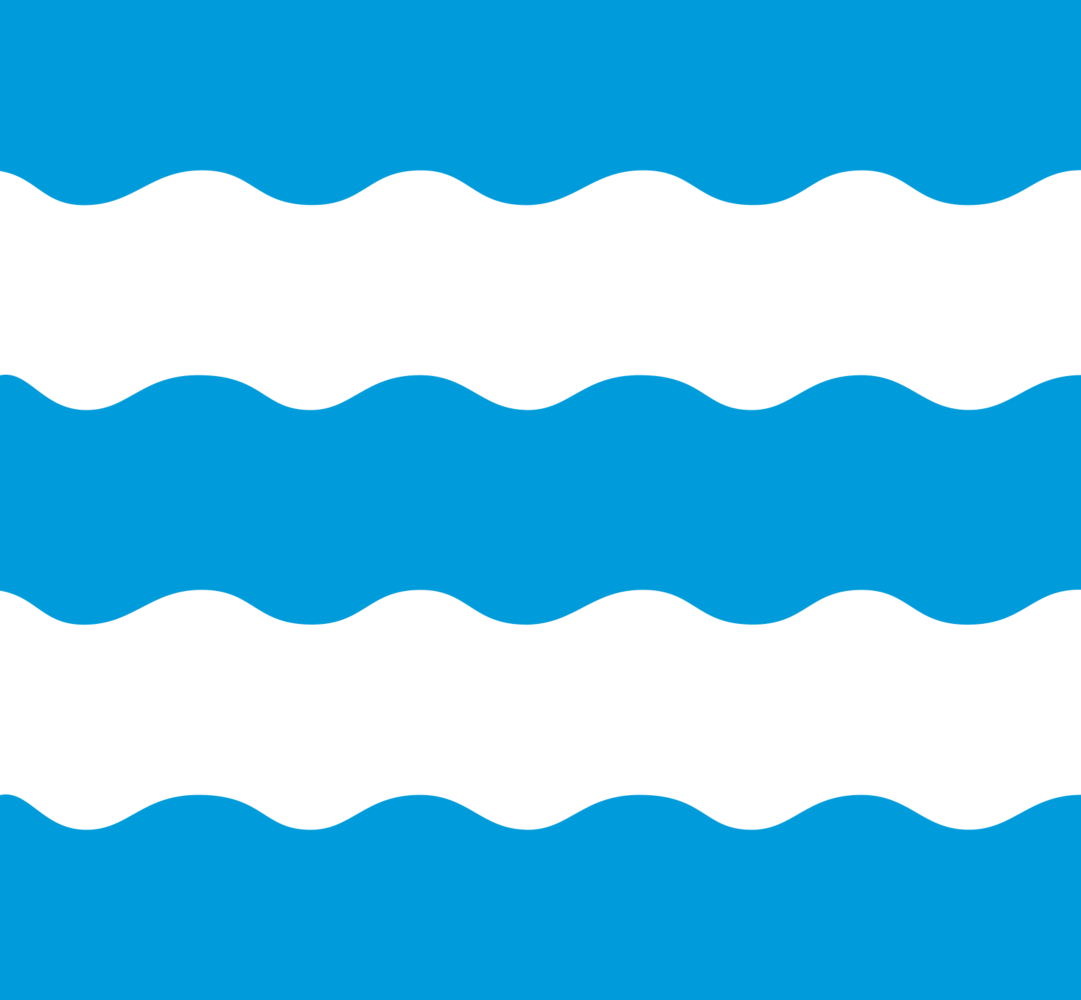
Flag of Harstad Municipality

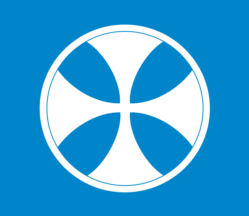
Flag of Ibestad Municipality

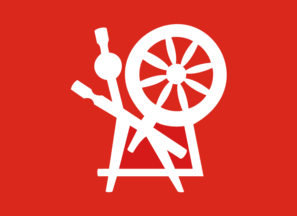
Flag of Kåfjord Municipality

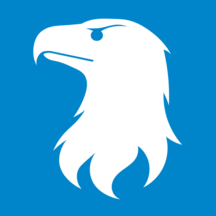
Flag of Karlsøy Municipality

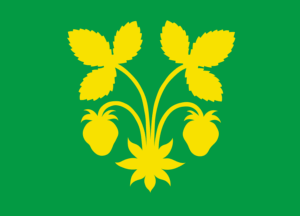
Flag of Kvæfjord Municipality

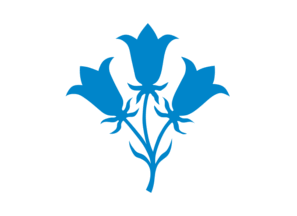
Flag of Kvænangen Municipality

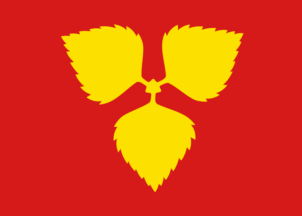
Flag of Lavangen Municipality

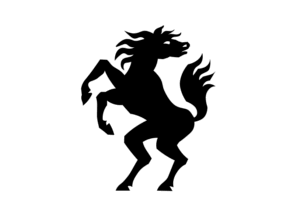
Flag of Lyngen Municipality

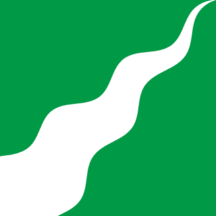
Flag of Målselv Municipality

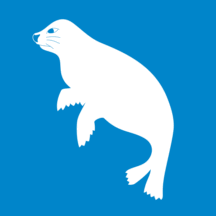
Flag of Salangen Municipality

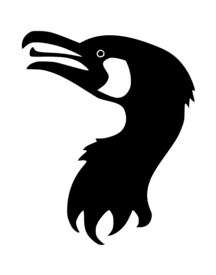
Flag of Skjervøy Municipality

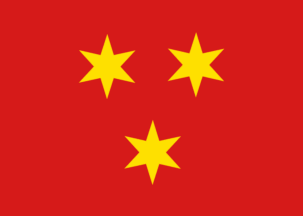
Flag of Sørreisa Municipality

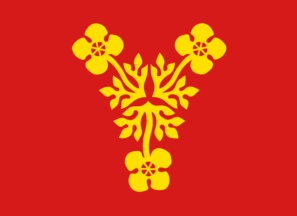
Flag of Storfjord Municipality

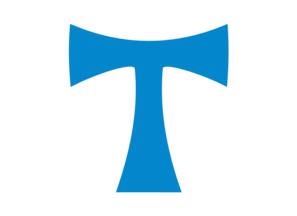
Flag of Tjeldsund Municipality

Flag of Tromsø Municipality

=== Trøndelag ===
Flags of municipalities in Trøndelag county.

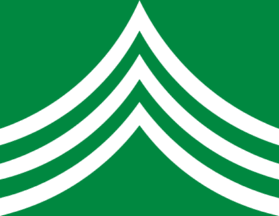
Flag of Flatanger Municipality

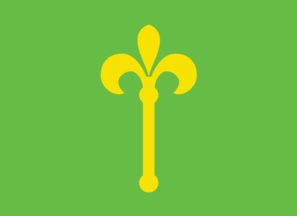
Flag of Frosta Municipality

Flag of Frøya Municipality

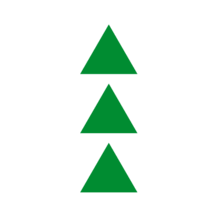
Flag of Grong Municipality

Flag of Hitra Municipality

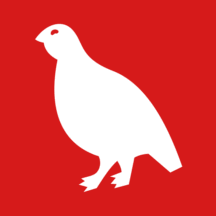
Flag of Holtålen Municipality

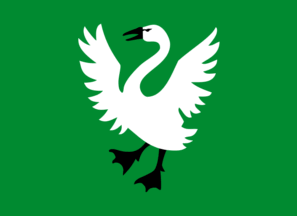
Flag of Høylandet Municipality

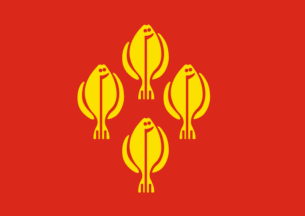
Flag of Inderøy Municipality

Flag of Indre Fosen Municipality

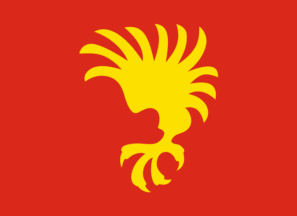
Flag of Leka Municipality

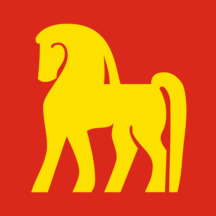
Flag of Levanger Municipality

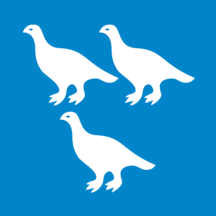
Flag of Lierne Municipality

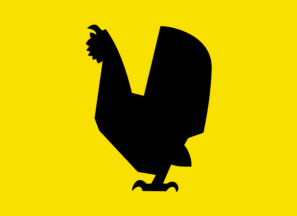
Flag of Malvik Municipality

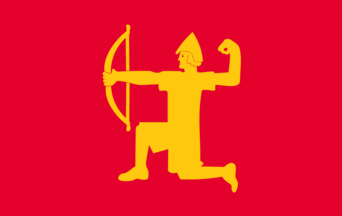
Flag of Melhus Municipality

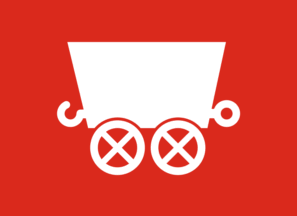
Flag of Meråker Municipality

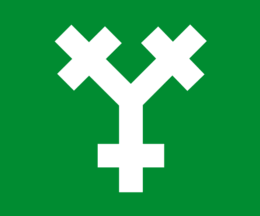
Flag of Midtre Gauldal Municipality

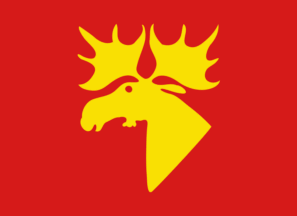
Flag of Namsos Municipality

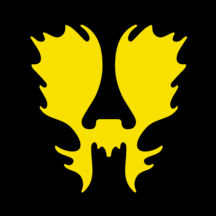
Flag of Namsskogan Municipality

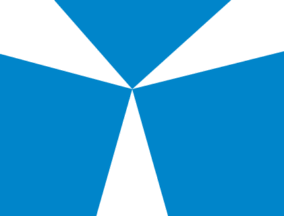
Flag of Oppdal Municipality

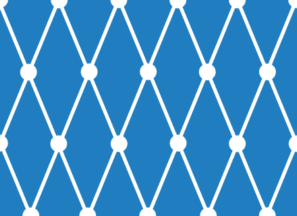
Flag of Osen Municipality

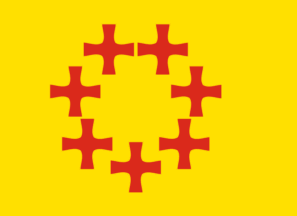
Flag of Overhalla Municipality

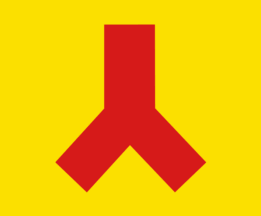
Flag of Rennebu Municipality

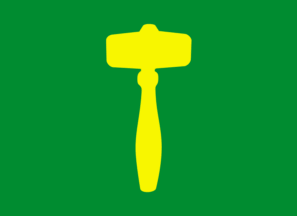
Flag of Rindal Municipality

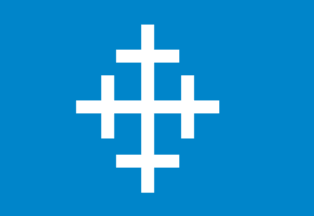
Flag of Røyrvik Municipality

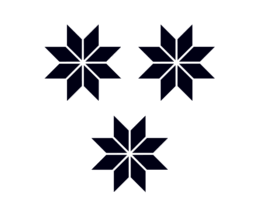
Flag of Selbu Municipality

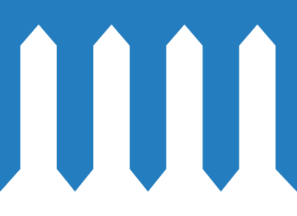
Flag of Skaun Municipality

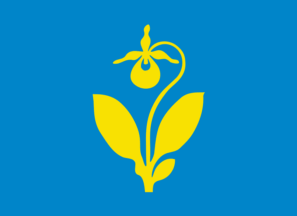
Flag of Snåsa Municipality

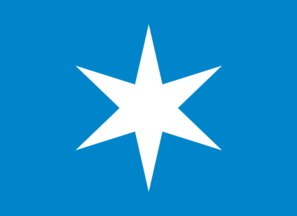
Flag of Steinkjer Municipality

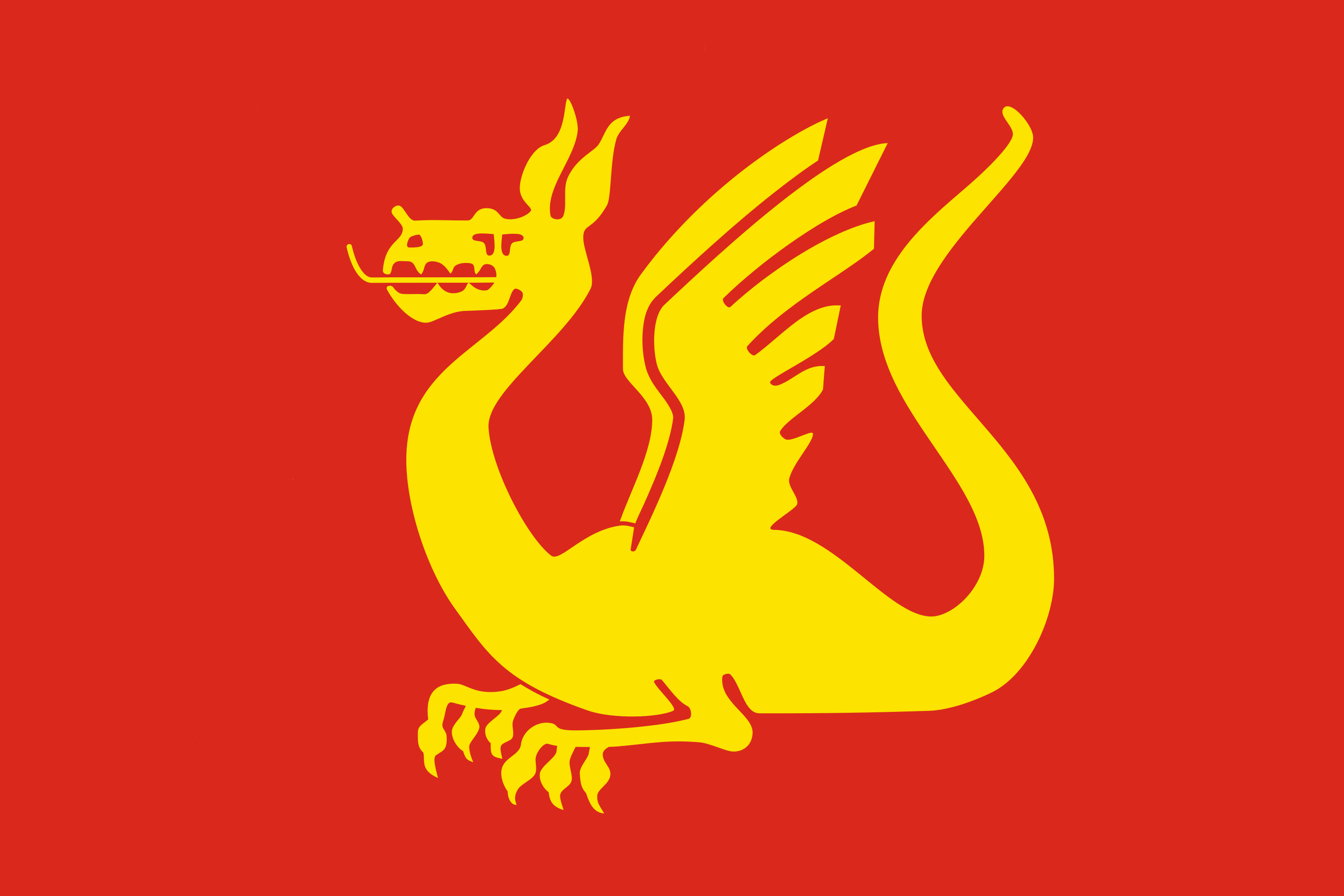
Flag of Stjørdal Municipality

Flag of Trondheim Municipality

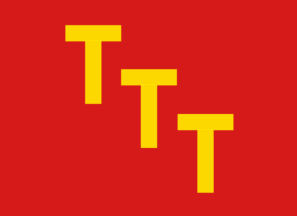
Flag of Tydal Municipality

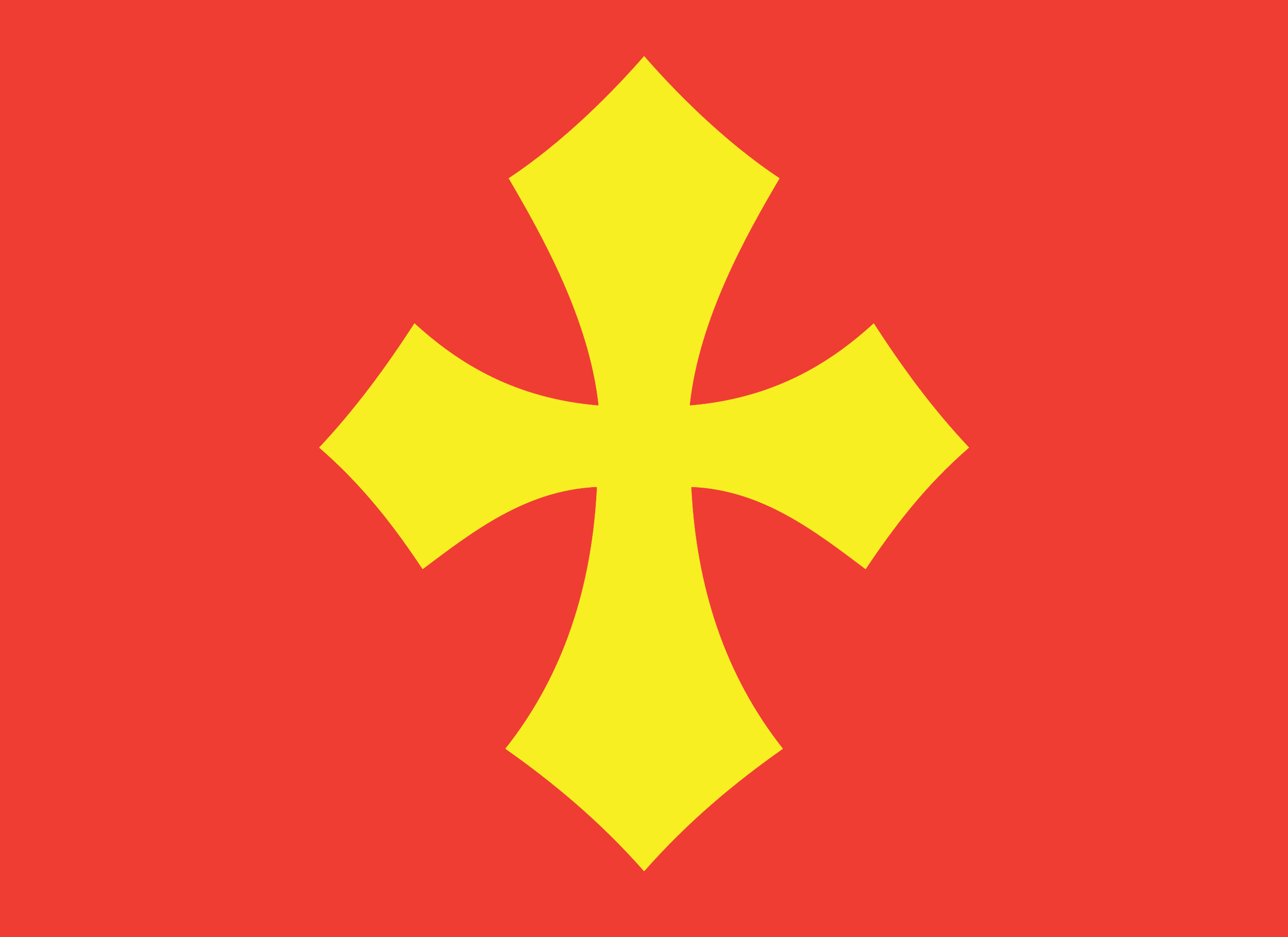
Flag of Verdal Municipality

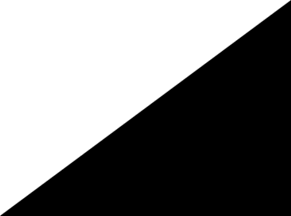
Flag of Ørland Municipality

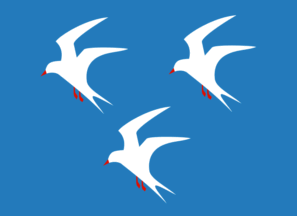
Flag of Åfjord Municipality

=== Vestfold ===
Flags of municipalities in Vestfold county.

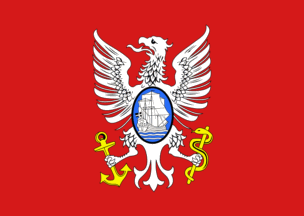
Flag of Holmestrand Municipality

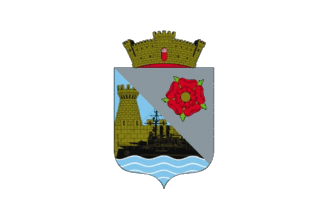
Flag of Horten Municipality

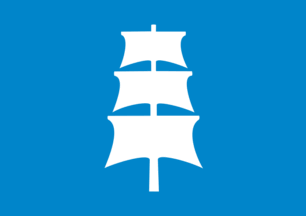
Flag of Larvik Municipality

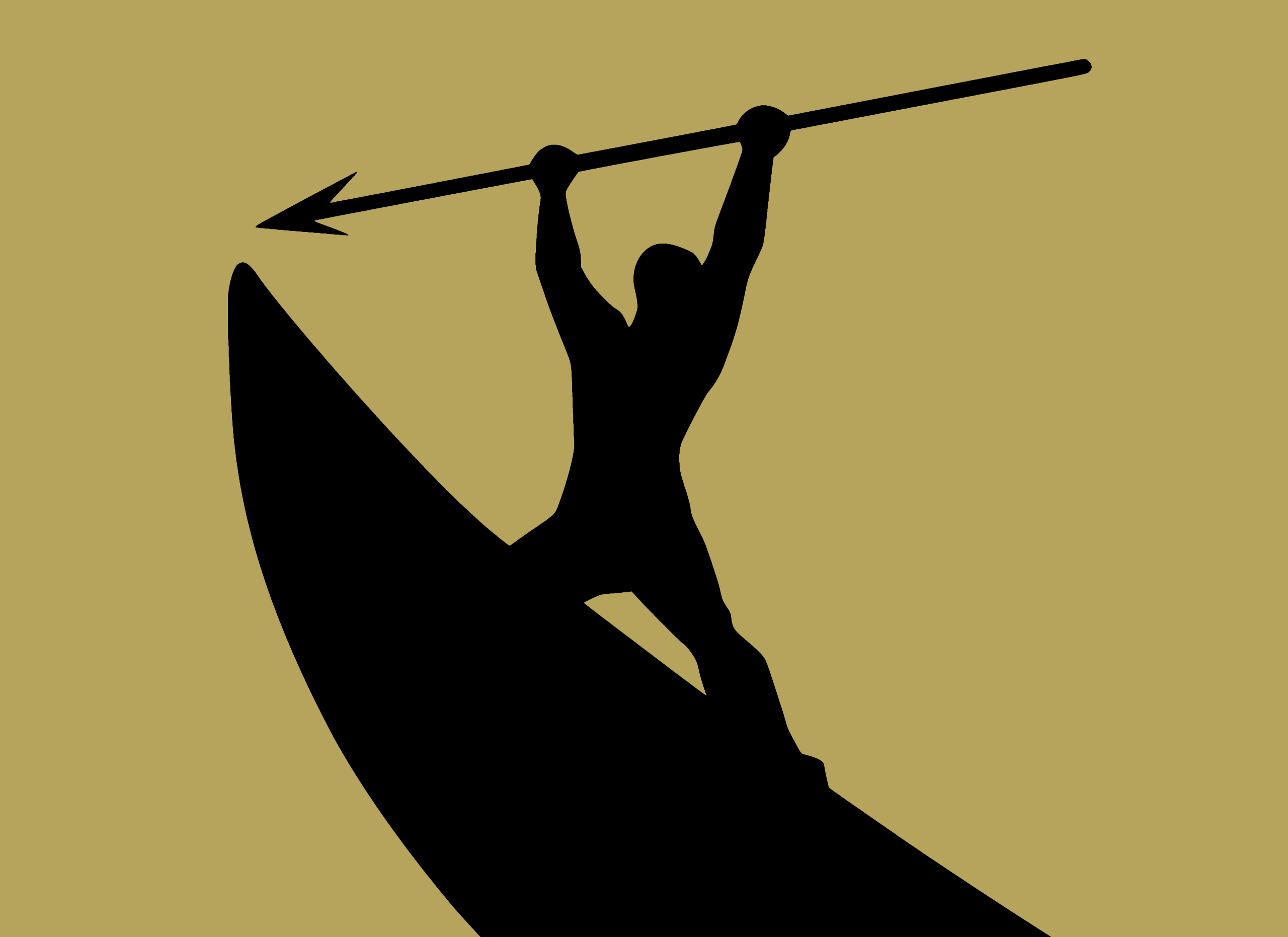
Flag of Sandefjord Municipality

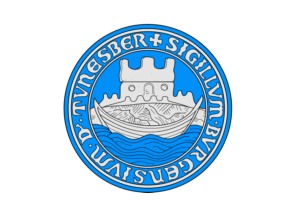
Flag of Tønsberg Municipality

=== Vestland ===
Flags of municipalities in Vestland county.

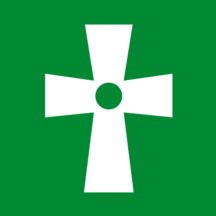
Flag of Askvoll Municipality

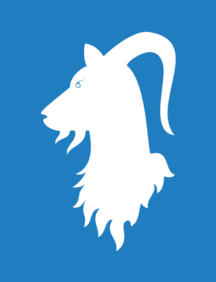
Flag of Aurland Municipality

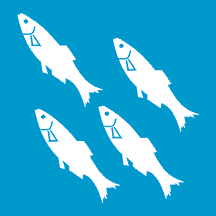
Flag of Austevoll Municipality

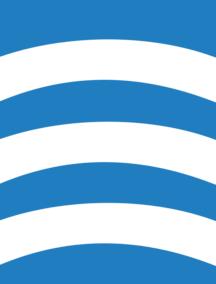
Flag of Austrheim Municipality

Flag of Bergen Municipality

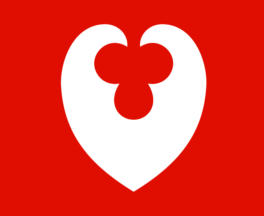
Flag of Bømlo Municipality

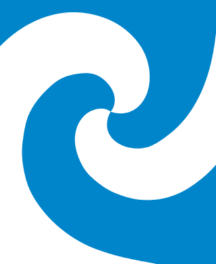
Flag of Bremanger Municipality

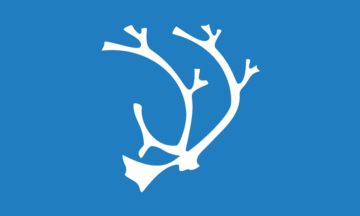
Flag of Eidfjord Municipality

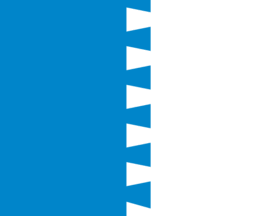
Flag of Etne Municipality

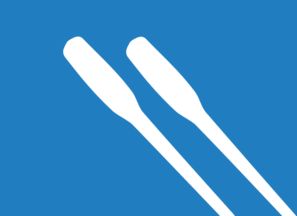
Flag of Fedje Municipality

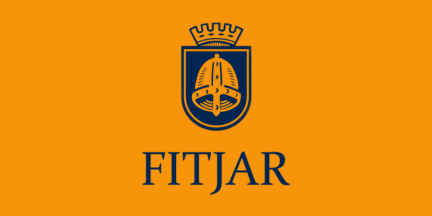
Flag of Fitjar Municipality

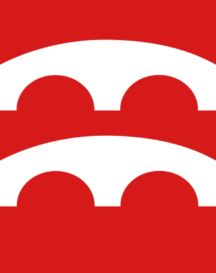
Flag of Fjaler Municipality

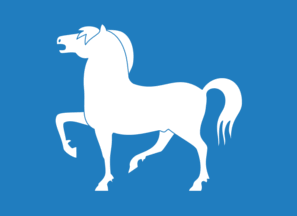
Flag of Gloppen Municipality

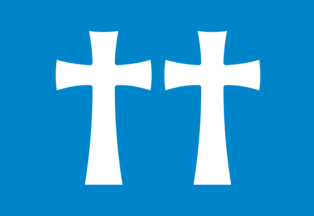
Flag of Gulen Municipality

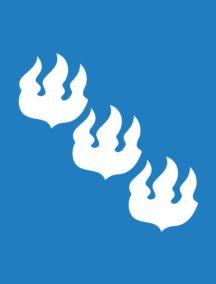
Flag of Høyanger Municipality

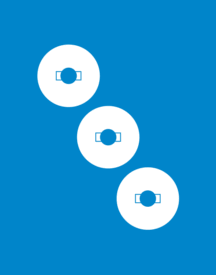
Flag of Hyllestad Municipality

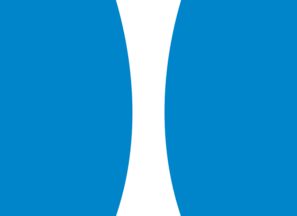
Flag of Kvam Municipality

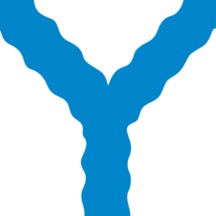
Flag of Kvinnherad Municipality

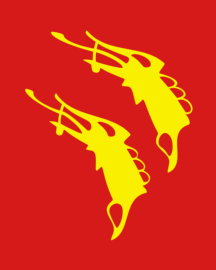
Flag of Lærdal Municipality

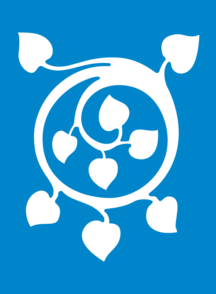
Flag of Luster Municipality

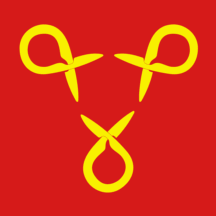
Flag of Masfjorden Municipality

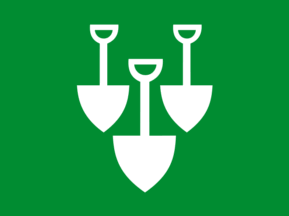
Flag of Modalen Municipality

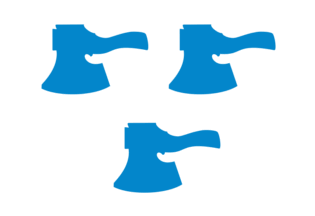
Flag of Osterøy Municipality

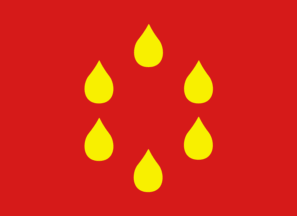
Flag of Samnanger Municipality

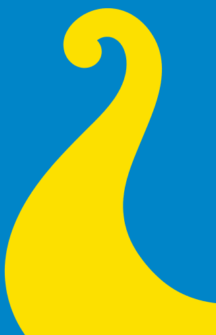
Former flag of Sogndal Municipality

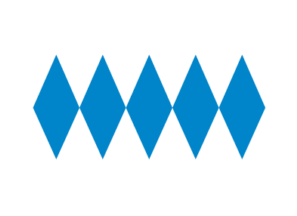
Flag of Solund Municipality

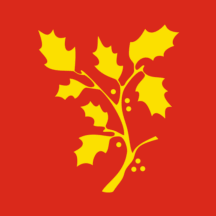
Flag of Stord Municipality

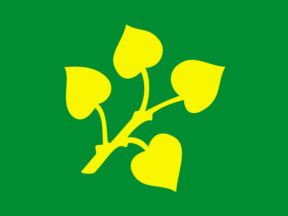
Flag of Stryn Municipality

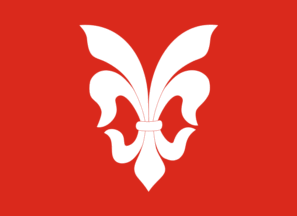
Flag of Sveio Municipality

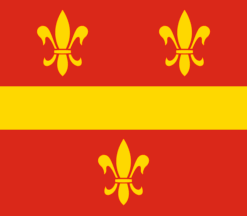
Flag of Ullensvang Municipality

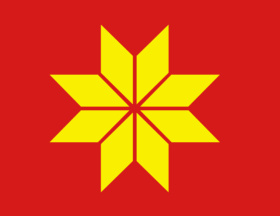
Flag of Ulvik Municipality

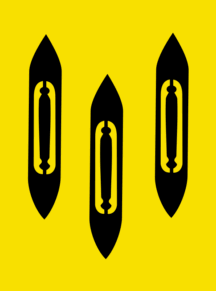
Flag of Vaksdal Municipality

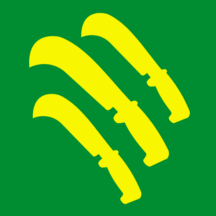
Flag of Vik Municipality

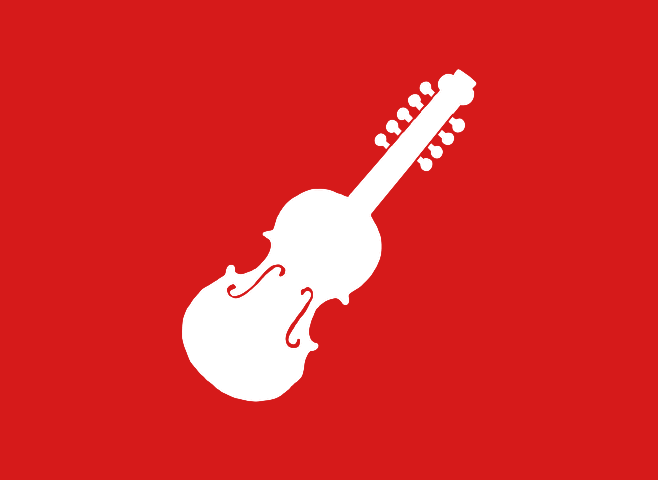
Flag of Voss Municipality

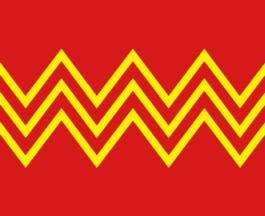
Flag of Årdal Municipality

=== Østfold ===
Flags of municipalities in Østfold county.

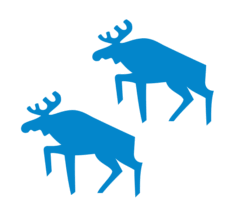
Flag of Aremark Municipality

Flag of Fredrikstad Municipality

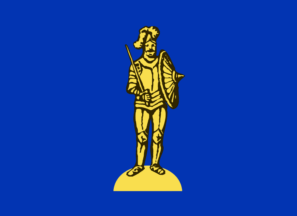
Flag of Halden Municipality

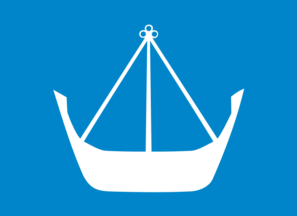
Flag of Hvaler Municipality

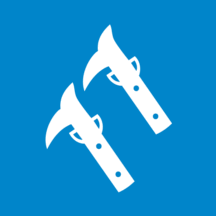
Flag of Marker Municipality

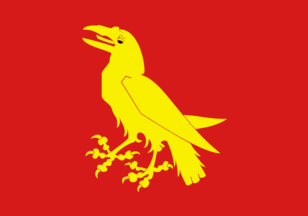
Flag of Moss Municipality

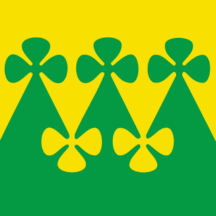
Flag of Rakkestad Municipality

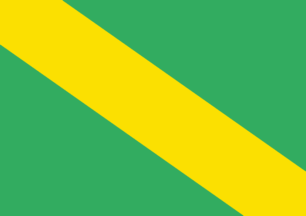
Flag of Råde Municipality

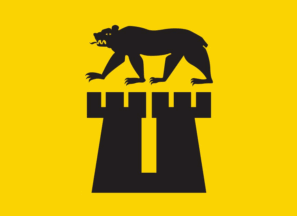
Flag of Sarpsborg Municipality

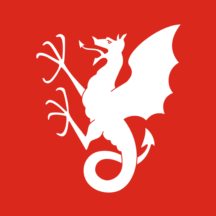
Flag of Skiptvet Municipality

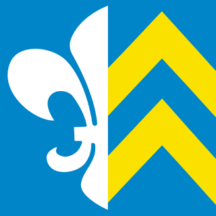
Flag of Våler Municipality
