= Coat of arms of Sogn og Fjordane =

Norwegian county coat of arms

Coat of arms of Sogn og Fjordane county

The coat of arms of Sogn og Fjordane is an official symbol of Sogn og Fjordane county, Norway.

The coat of arms features the geographical layout of the county. The three blue peaks on a silver background symbolize the three fjords of the county: Nordfjord, Sunnfjord, and Sognefjord. The name of the county is derived from these fjords. Nearly all villages, towns and population centers are situated on one of these fjords.

The coat of arms was introduced on 23 September 1983. It is almost exclusively used by the County Administration and use by others must be approved by them in advance. A banner of the coat of arms is used as the county flag.

== Literature ==
- Cappelen, Hans; Johannessen, Knut (1987). "Norske kommunevåpen". Oslo : Kommunalforlaget. ISBN 82-7242-418-5
