= Flag of Sogn og Fjordane =

Norwegian county flag

Flag of Sogn og Fjordane county

The flag of Sogn og Fjordane was the official flag for Sogn og Fjordane county in Norway. It was introduced on 23 September 1983. The flag is a banner of the coat of arms of Sogn og Fjordane. The flag design shows the geographical layout of the county: three large fjords (in blue) protruding into the land (in white). The three fjords are the Nordfjord, Sunnfjord, and Sognefjord. Nearly all villages and towns are situated on one of these fjords and the name of the county is based on the fjords.

The flag is almost exclusively used by the County Administration. As with other counties in Norway the general public uses the Flag of Norway.

The company flag of Fjord1 Fylkesbaatane (in use from 1858 to 2009) has received some attention as a flag representing Sogn og Fjordane county. Even though the company has adopted a new flag as part of a modern re-branding, the old Fylkesbaatane flag is still more prevalently seen than the official county flag.
