= Royal standard of Norway =

Flag used by the King of Norway

The Royal Standard

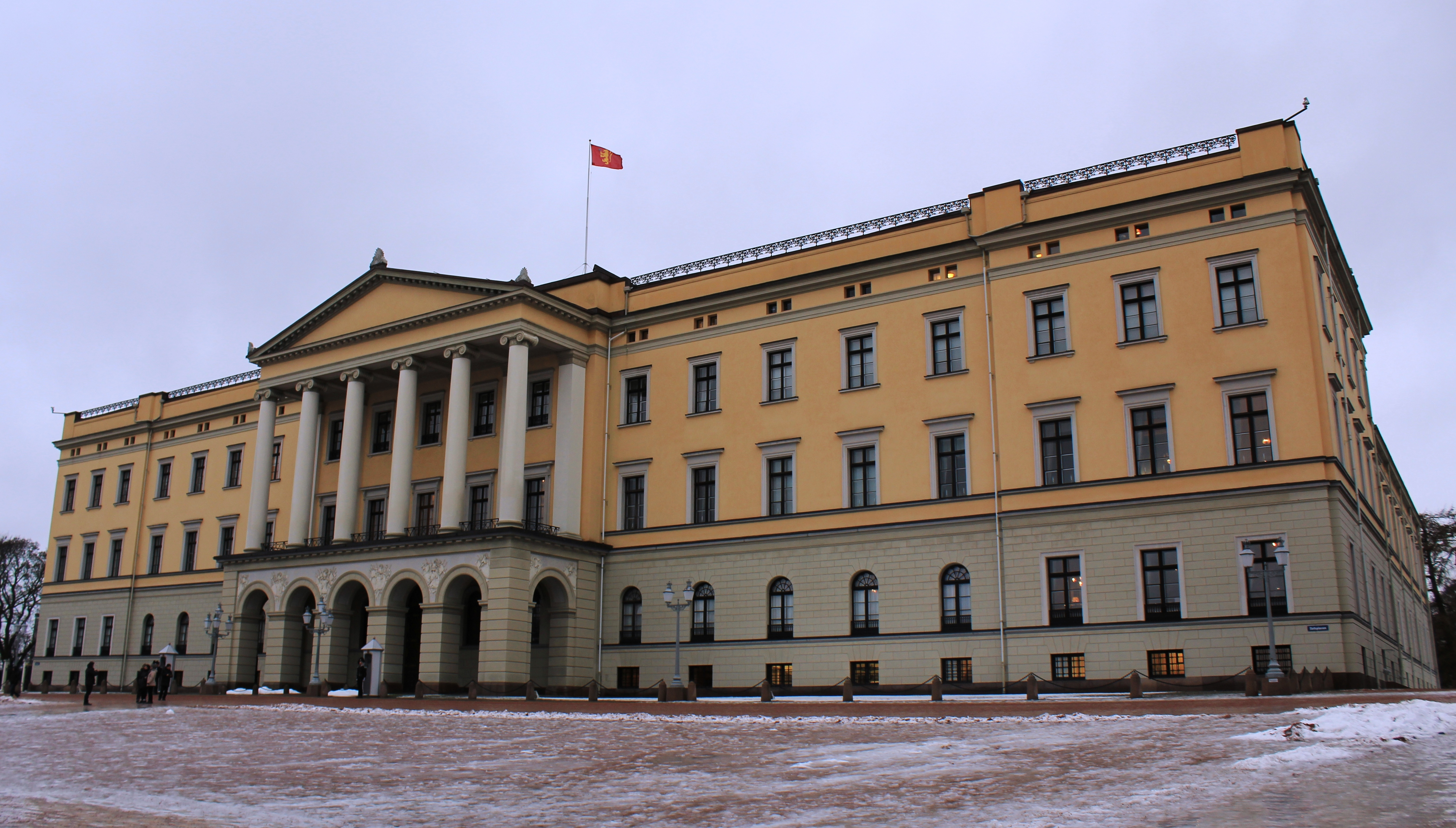
The Royal Standard flying over the Royal Palace in Oslo

The Royal Standard of Norway (Norwegian: Kongeflagget) is used by the King of Norway. Of historical origin, it was introduced by Cabinet Decision of 15 November 1905, following the plebiscite confirming the election of Prince Carl of Denmark to the vacant throne after the dissolution of the union between Sweden and Norway. Under his chosen name of Haakon VII, the new king arrived in the capital Kristiania on 25 November 1905 on a ship flying the royal standard for the first time.

The flag of the King is also used by the Queen.

== Background and history ==
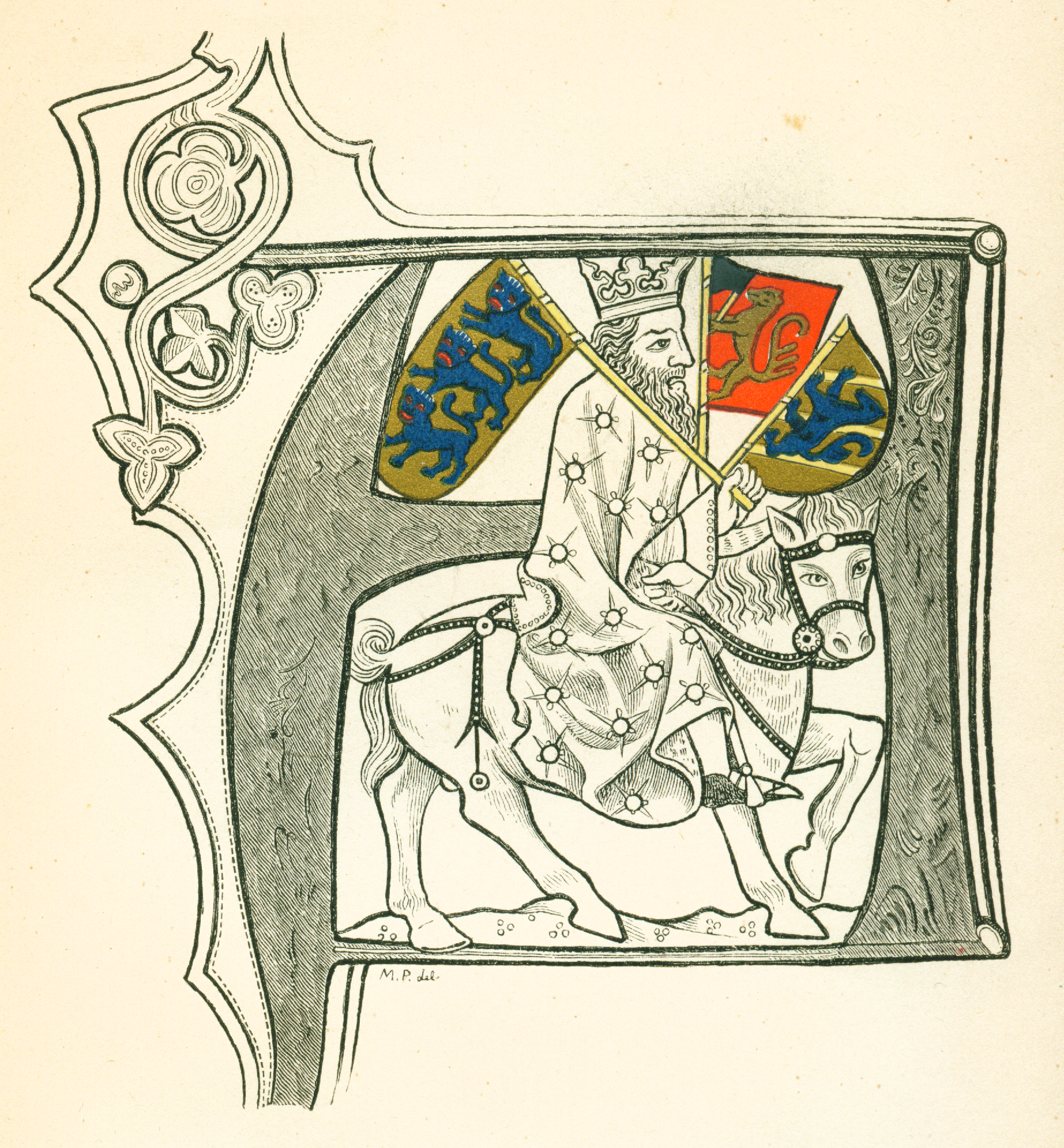
A depiction originally from ca. 1370 of a Nordic king holding the flags of Denmark, Norway, and Sweden.

A reconstruction of the medieval flag of Norway

The flag was referred to as the "ancient royal standard" of Norway when it was re-introduced in 1905. It is the earliest known flag of Norway, originally only a flag for the king, as it is today. During the early period of the union with Denmark, it was occasionally flown from castles and naval vessels until it was gradually phased out during the 17th and 18th centuries. Its earliest certain depiction is on the seal of Duchess Ingebjørg in 1318. In 1748 a decree stated that the Dannebrog should be the only legal merchant flag for ships of the united kingdoms of Denmark-Norway.

=== Union between Sweden and Norway (1814–1905) ===
From 1814 to 1905, Norway entered a personal union with Sweden. As a result, the two nations would share the same monarch (and a common foreign policy) but remain separate kingdoms with their own laws and legislative bodies. In 1844, new flags with common features reflecting the union were introduced for the two kingdoms.

From 1844 until 1905, the kings of Norway (i.e. also the King of Sweden) used a royal standard on the same pattern as Denmark and Sweden. It was Norway's war flag with the union mark in the canton and the addition of the royal union arms in the centre of the cross. In Norway, growing discontent with the union would lead to the union mark being removed from the merchant (i.e. today's national flag) and the state flag, but the mark remained in the war flag (naval ensign) and the royal flag as they were under jurisdiction of the king.

The flag introduced in 1844 would be made redundant after the dissolution of the union with Sweden in 1905 and the adoption of the current flag.

Royal Standard of Sweden and Norway 1815-1844

Royal Standard of Norway 1844-1905

== Description ==
The flag is the coat of arms of Norway in banner form and features a golden lion over a red field. With the dissolution of the Union in 1905 and election of a new king, the Norwegian Lion coat of arms were subsequently adopted for use by the King as was the old royal flag.

Graphically, that first royal standard was charged with a lion designed by the Danish expert on heraldry Anders Thiset, complying with the blazon decided by the Cabinet. It differed from the definitive version of the royal standard, which was charged with the lion designed by the painter Eilif Peterssen The Peterssen designed lion was changed on the coat of arms for government use in 1937 to fit a medieval style, but the king kept the 1905 Peterssen design for the royal arms and standard.

== Standard of the Crown Princess ==
Standard of the Crown Princess

The flag of the Crown Princess (Kronprinsesseflagget) is the same as the royal standard, except that the field is swallowtailed. It was introduced by Royal Resolution of 26 September 1924. The flag is currently used by Ingrid Alexandra, Crown Princess of Norway.

== Pennant ==
The Royal Pennant

== See also ==
- Flag of Norway
- Line of succession to the Norwegian Throne

== Sources ==
- Flags of the World
- Royal standards in NRK website
- Royal standards in encyclopedia Skikk og bruk
- The Royal Standard flown from the Royal palace
- National Archive flag history With a picture of the seal of duchess Ingebjørg.
- Hans Cappelen: Norge i 1905: Gammelt riksvåpen og nytt kongevåpen, (Norway in 1905: Old national arms and new royal arms) Heraldisk Tidsskrift, Vol. 10 No. 94, Copenhagen October 2006
