= List of flags of Sweden =

The following is a list of flags of Sweden.

== National flag and state flag ==
Flag	Date	Use	Description
	1906–present	Civil and state flag and ensign	A blue field with a gold Nordic cross

== Royal standards ==
Flag	Date	Use	Description
	1943–present	Personal command sign of H.M. the king of Sweden (used on land)	The greater coat of arms of Sweden, which is blue divided quarterly by a cross pattée of gold
	1905–present	Royal standard of Sweden, used by H.M. the king of Sweden and H.M. the queen of Sweden	Royal flag with the greater national coat of arms
	1905–present	Royal pennant of Sweden, used by H.M. the king of Sweden above the royal flag on naval ships	Split pennant with the greater national coat of arms
	1905–present	Used by other members of the Royal House	Royal flag with the lesser national coat of arms (surrounded by the insignias of the Order of the Seraphim)
	1905–present	Used by the heir apparent above the royal flag on naval ships	Split pennant with the lesser national coat of arms
	1905–present	Used by the regent ad interim, when he is a non-royal	Same as the military ensign
	1844–1905	Royal standard of the king	
	1815–1844	Royal standard with the Swedish royal arms	Naval ensign of the union with square canton

== Military flags ==
Flag	Date	Use	Description
	1905–present	Military war flag and ensign of Sweden. Also used as a naval jack.	

=== Flags of the Navy ===
Flag	Date	Use	Description
	1972–present	Rank flag of admirals	The naval ensign with four white stars in the upper hoist corner. Before 1972 the flag bore three stars (like the present flag of a vice admiral).
	1972–present	Rank flag of vice admirals	The naval ensign with three white stars in the upper hoist corner. Before 1972 the flag bore two stars (like the present flag of a rear admiral).
	1972–present	Rank flag of rear admirals	The naval ensign with two white stars in the upper hoist corner. Before 1972 the flag bore one star (like the present flag of a flotilla admiral).
	2001–present	Rank flag of flotilla admirals	The naval ensign with one white star in the upper hoist corner.
		Broad pennant of commodores	Horizontally divided (1:1) forked broad pennant (5:8)
		Pennant of commanders and lieutenant commanders	
		Burgee of captains, lieutenants and ensigns	Vertically divided (1:1) triangular ensign (5:8)
		Pennant of the fleet commander	
		Pennant of the flotilla commander	
		Pennant of the division commander	
		Pennant of the senior commander afloat	

== Historical flags ==
Flag	Date	Use	Description
	November 1905 – June 1906	National flag and civil ensign	Union badge removed
	1844–1905	National flag and civil ensign	Union badge in the upper hoist corner
	1844–1905	State flag and military ensign	Swallowtail, union badge in the upper hoist corner
	1897–1905	Alternate state flag	State flag to be used on state ships and at government buildings that did not fly the military ensign. Prior to 1897, used by private ships serving the Swedish royal mail.
	1844–1905	Naval jack and diplomatic flag	The Union badge: a cross bearing the colours of both Sweden and Norway.
	–1844	Civil ensign	Similar to the present national flag (slightly different colors and proportions occurred)
	1818–1844	Union civil ensign ("distant waters")	White saltire on red in the upper hoist corner. The canton in red and white represented Norway. The ensign was introduced on 26 October 1818, for use in "distant waters", i.e. beyond Cape Finisterre in North-West Spain, as an alternative to the standard Swedish civil ensign which could also be used by Norwegian ships if they wished. By royal resolution of 17 July 1821, the saltire flag was ordered as the only Norwegian and Swedish civil ensign in "distant waters".
	1815–1844	State flag and military ensign	White saltire on red in the upper hoist corner. The canton in red and white represented Norway.
	1838–1844	Alternate state flag	Used by private ships serving the Swedish royal mail.
	1761–1813	Military ensign of the archipelago fleet	An all-blue triple-tailed flag to be used by the Arméns flotta
	mid-17th century – 1815	State flag and war ensign	Similar to the present military ensign (slightly different colors and proportions occurred)
	c. 1520s – c. 1620	State flag and war ensign	Swallow-tailed flag (slightly different colors and proportions occurred)
	1397–1523	The "banner of the realms", flag of the Kalmar Union	The flag of the Kalmar Union was used in the triple union led by Denmark, which included Norway and Sweden. In a letter written by Eric of Pomerania dated from 1430, the "banner of the realms" is described as "a red cross in a yellow field".
	14th century	Royal banner of arms of the House of Bjälbo	Four horizontal blue stripes and three white stripes with a lion in the center and 56 hearts distributed on the blue stripes

== Flags of national minorities ==
Flag	Date	Use	Description
	2007	Sweden Finns	
	1971	Romani people	Divided in blue and green horizontally with a red 16-spoked cartwheel in the center
	1986	Sámi people	
	2007	Tornedalians	Yellow, white, and blue horizontal tricolour
	2022–present	Cultural flag of the Forest Finns	

== Regional flags ==
Flag	Status	Use	Description
	Semi-official	The traditional province of Skåne (Scania)	
	Official	Skåne County (Scania)	Also a similar flag exists with blue background for the Scania region
	Unofficial	The county of Jämtland	Jamtland (which belonged to Norway until 1645) has its own movement for the Republic of Jamtland – not a serious attempt for independence but more a touch of humor and local culture. The flag, however, is used in the area.
	Official	Jämtland County	Compare unofficial above. Jämtland modern county includes the two traditional provinces of Jämtland and Härjedalen.
	Unofficial	The traditional province of Småland	Småland is a relatively large traditional province in the south of Sweden that today is divided into three administrative counties, and also has two smaller areas outside these three counties.
	Official	Kronoberg County	Part of the historical province of Småland (see above)
	Official	Jönköping County	Part of the historical province of Småland (see above)
	Official	Kalmar County	Part of the historical province of Småland (see above) and the island province Öland (see below)
	Unofficial	The historical province and island Öland outside Småland in the Baltic Sea	Öland (Swedish for "the island land") has a long history and different nature compared to the main land of Sweden. Öland is the second largest island in Sweden.
	Unofficial	The traditional province Östergötland	The blue cross relates to the two main channels and the yellow to agricultural flat areas. Not much in use.
	Official	Östergötland County	Compare unofficial above
	Official	Västra Götaland County	Flag includes arms/flags from the four traditional provinces (Västergötland, Bohuslän, Dalsland and Älvsborg) that are included in this relatively newly formed regional county.
	Unofficial	The traditional province of Västergötland	Not much in use. Also compare the previous flag above that covers the same area and more.
	Official	Blekinge County	The coat of arms for the traditional province of Blekinge and the administrative Blekinge County. Not much in use.
	Official	Halland County	There is a geographical difference between the administrative Halland County and the traditional Halland province.
	Official	Värmland County	There is a geographical difference between the administrative Värmland County and the traditional Värmland province.
	Official	Örebro County	Örebro County includes the traditional province Närke and parts of the traditional provinces of Värmland and Västmanland. The flag includes arms from these three counties.
	Official	Södermanland County	The administrative Södermanland County includes parts (southern part) of traditional Södermanland County.
	Official	Uppsala County	The administrative Uppsala County includes parts (northern part) of traditional Uppland Province.
	Official	Stockholm County	The administrative Stockholm County includes parts (southern part) of traditional Uppland County and (northern part) of traditional Södermanland province. the flag includes arms from these both counties and also the arms of Stockholm city.
	Official	Gotland County	The administrative Gotland County consists of one main and a number of smaller islands in the Baltic Sea. This is the only county in Sweden that only has one municipality.
	Official	Västmanland County	The administrative Västmanland County includes parts of the traditional Västmanland province.
	Official	Dalarna County	This county was earlier known as Kopparbergs County and even earlier as Dalarna Province.
	Official	Gävleborg County	Gävleborg administrative County encompasses the traditional provinces of Gästrikland and Hälsingland.
	Official	Västernorrland County	Västernorrland administrative county covers approximately the traditional province of Ångermanland and the traditional province of Medelpad.
	Official	Västerbotten County	Västerbotten administrative county covers the traditional province of Västerbotten and parts of the traditional province Swedish Lapland and the traditional province of Ångermanland.
	Official	Norrbotten County	Norrbotten County includes the traditional province of Norrbotten and about two-thirds of the traditional province of Swedish Lapland.
	Unofficial	Coastal area of Roslagen	Roslagen is the name of the coastal areas of Uppland province in Sweden, which also constitutes the northern part of the Stockholm archipelago. Norrtälje is sometimes named the capital city of Roslagen.

Each official flag is based on the coat of arms for the county; see gallery, and used on buildings etc. used by respective county administration. Unofficial flags are used by private and local people.

== See also ==
- Flag of Sweden
- Coat of arms of Sweden
- Nordic cross flag
- List of municipalities of Sweden
