= Flag of Norway =

Kingdom of Norway
- Use: National flag and civil ensign
- Proportion: 8:11
- Adopted: 13 July 1821; 205 years ago
- Design: A red field charged with a white-fimbriated dark blue Nordic cross that extends to the edges; the vertical part of the cross is shifted to the hoist side.
- Designed by: Fredrik Meltzer
- Use: State and war flag, state and naval ensign
- Proportion: 16:27
- Kongeflagget ("The King’s Flag") "Ancient Royal Standard" (1905)
- Royal Standard of Norway (1905–present); Flag of Norway (Middle Ages)
- Use: Sporadic 13th – 18th century (Norwegian Realm, Kalmar Union, Denmark-Norway); 1905–present (Kingdom of Norway)
- Proportion: 8:11
- Adopted: 15 November 1905; 121 years ago
- Design: The Coat of arms of Norway in banner form that features a golden lion holding an axe over a red field.
- Designed by: Various (Anders Thiset, Eilif Peterssen, Cabinet of Norway)

The national flag of Norway (Bokmål: Norges flagg; Nynorsk: Noregs flagg; lit. 'Norway's flag') is red with a navy blue Scandinavian cross bordered in white that extends to the edges of the flag; the vertical part of the cross is shifted to the hoist side in the style of the Dannebrog, the flag of Denmark.

== History ==
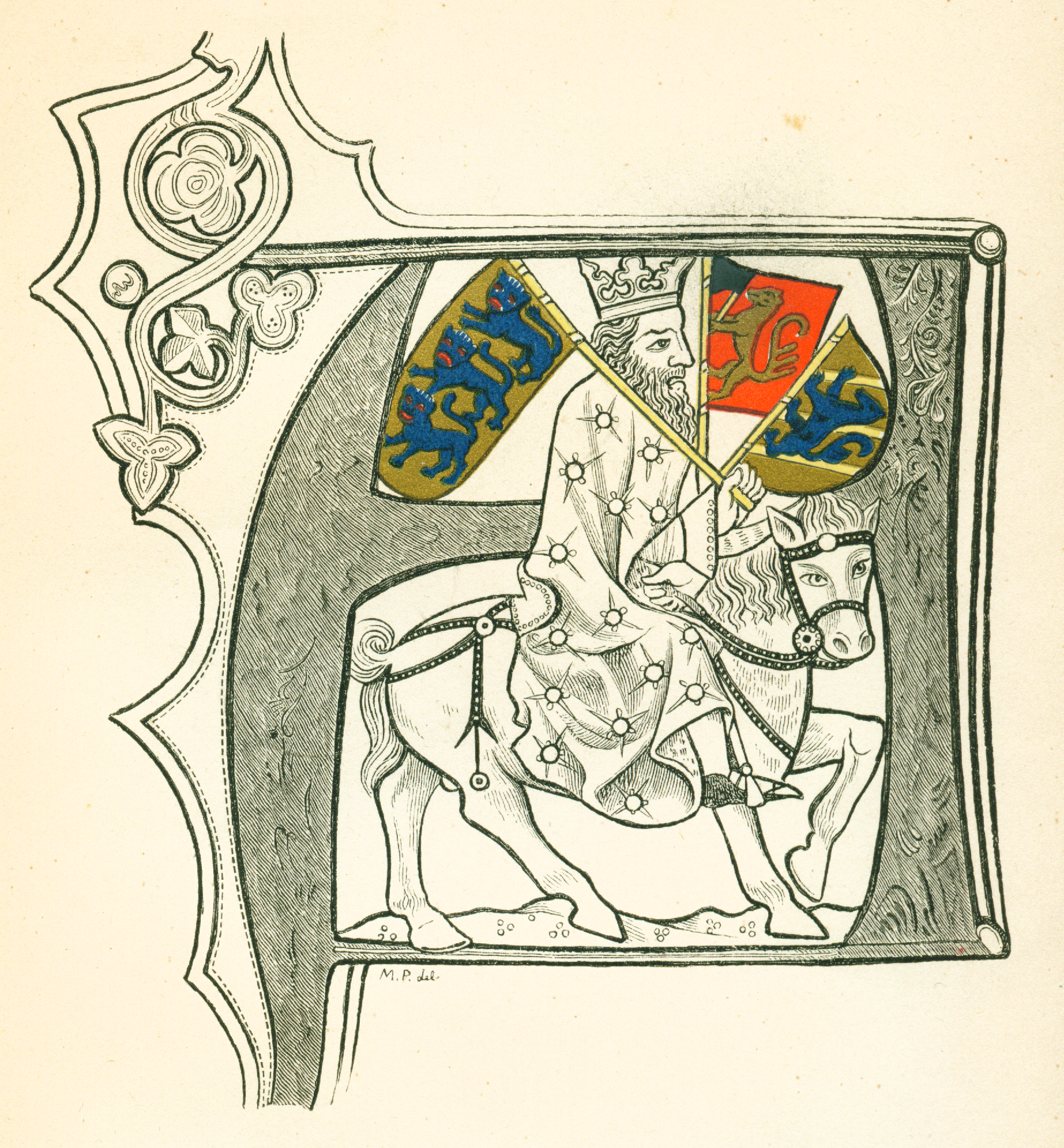
A depiction originally from ca 1370 of a Nordic king holding the historic emblems and coats of arms of Denmark, Norway, and Sweden.

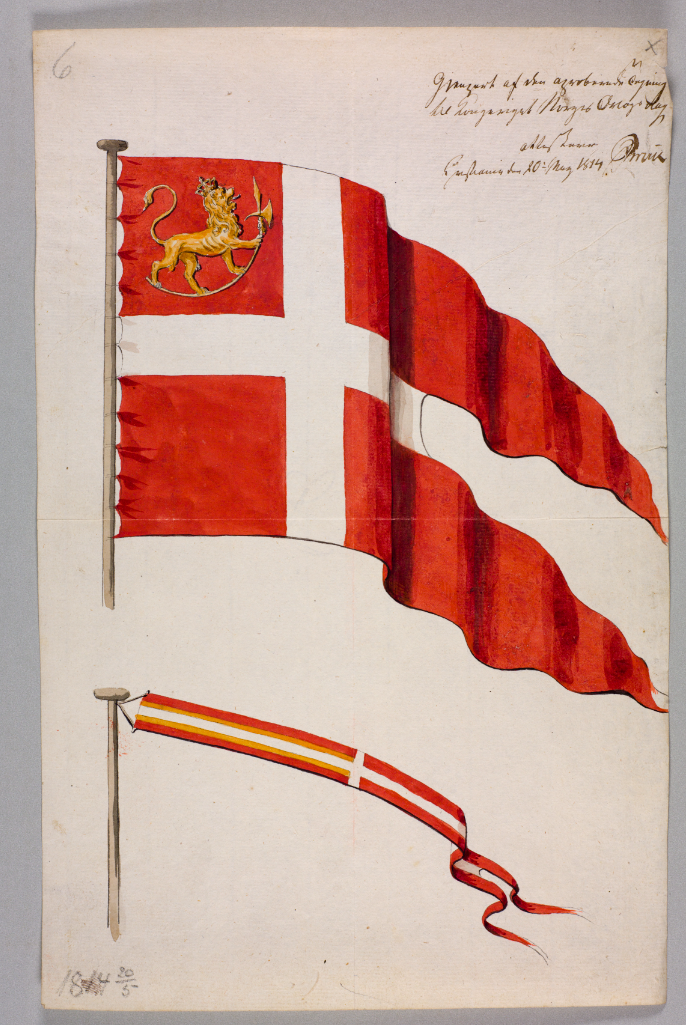
The first war flag of independent Norway, introduced 27 February 1814, replaced 7 March 1815 by a common war flag for Sweden and Norway.

The national and merchant flag of Norway (1844–1899), with the union mark of Sweden-Norway, the "herring salad".

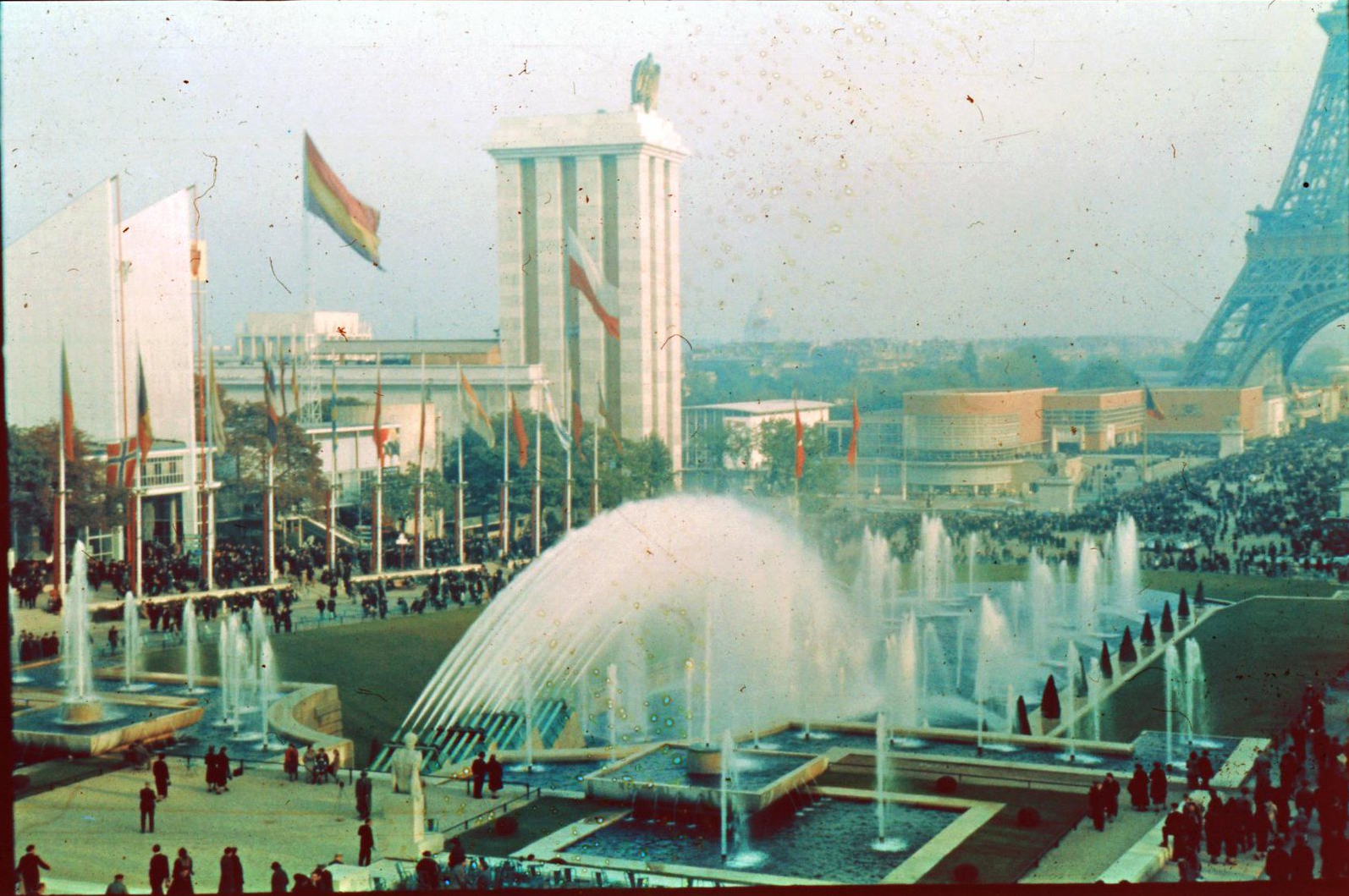
The national flag of Norway during the World Expo in Paris (1937).

It is difficult to establish what the earliest flag of Norway looked like. Before the Middle Ages began, independent states did not fly flags; kings and other rulers flew banners, especially in battle. Olaf Haraldsson used a serpent within a white mark at the Battle of Nesjar. Prior to this, a standard containing a raven or dragon was used. Magnus the Good used the same mark as Saint Olav. Harald Hardrada used the raven banner. This flag was flown by various Viking chieftains and other Scandinavian rulers during the 9th, 10th, and 11th centuries AD. It wasn't until the 1130s that Inge I used a red lion on gold as his standard. Sverre used an eagle in gold and red. Eirik II used a flag described as a golden lion with axe and crown on red. From 1280, this eventually became the royal standard of Norway (Kongeflagget).

The flag is based on the coat of arms and was originally only a flag for the ruler of Norway (as it is today). It was later also used on ships and on fortresses until it was gradually phased out during the 17th and 18th centuries. Its earliest certain depiction is on the seal of duchess Ingebjørg in 1318. Around 1500 it became the custom for ships to fly the flag of their home country to identify their nationality. A red flag with the golden lion and silver halberd is depicted as the flag of Norway in a Dutch flag book from 1669 to 1670. At least as late as 1698 the lion banner was flown over Akershus Fortress. The "Norwegian lion" was placed in the colours of all the Norwegian regiments in 1641. In 1748 a decree stated that the Dannebrog should be the only legal merchant flag.

From 1537-1814, Norway used the same flag as Denmark, as it was in union with that country. In 1814, Norway adopted the Danish flag with the Kongeflagget in the canton, or the upper square at the hoist. This flag was in use as state and war flag until 1815 and as a merchant flag until 1821. Later in 1814 Norway was united with Sweden, and on 7 March 1815 a common war flag for both states was introduced by royal order in council, the Swedish flag with a white cross on a red background in the square canton. The same design in a rectangular flag was introduced as an alternate merchant flag in 1818, for use in distant waters, i.e. south of Cape Finisterre in Spain.

The current flag of Norway was designed in 1821 by Fredrik Meltzer, a member of the parliament (Storting). It was adopted by both chambers of the Storting on 11 and 16 May, respectively. However, the king refused to sign the flag law, but approved the design for civilian use by royal order in council on 13 July 1821. The constitution of 1814 explicitly stated that the war flag was to be a union flag, hence the common flag (Swedish with a canton signifying Norway) was used by the armies and navies of both states until 1844.

Some proposals for the flag of Norway (1821)
Proposal 1

Proposal 2

Proposal 3 (chosen)

Proposal 6

Proposal 7

Proposal 8

Proposal 10

Proposal 11 (A)

Proposal 11 (B)

Proposal 11 (C)

Proposal 12

Proposal 13

Proposal 14

Proposal 15

Proposal 16

Proposal 17

Until 1838 the Norwegian flag was only used in Northern waters, i.e. the waters north of Cape Finisterre, as Norway had no treaty with the Barbary pirates of North Africa and had to fly the Swedish or union flag for protection. In 1844 a union mark combining Norwegian and Swedish colours was placed at the hoist of both countries' flags. The badge was jokingly or derogatorily called Sildesalaten ('the herring salad') because of its jumble of colours and resemblance to a popular dish on the breakfast tables of both countries. Initially, the union flag was popular in Norway, since it clearly denoted the equal status of the two united states. As the union with Sweden became less popular, the Norwegian parliament abolished the union mark from the national (merchant) and state flags in 1898. Although the law was not approved by the King, it became effective since it had been passed by three consecutive Stortings. The "pure" flag was first flown in 1899, but the union mark had to be kept in the war flag. After the dissolution of the union, it was removed from the navy flag as well on 9 June 1905. Sweden kept it in all flags until 1 November 1905.

== Laws regarding the flag ==
The Norwegian flag law of 1898 specifies the appearance of the merchant and state flags and their use by merchant ships, customs and post vessels. The flag regulations of 1927 further describe the use of the state flag on state property and on national holidays.

The flag regulations also describe the time of day when the flag should be hoisted and lowered. From March to October the flag should be hoisted from 08.00. From November to February it should be hoisted from 09.00. The flag is lowered at sunset, although no later than 21.00, even if sunset is later than that. In the northern counties of Nordland and Troms the flag is flown between 10.00 and 15.00 from November to February. These rules do not apply for private use of the flag, but they are generally observed by all citizens.

There also exist written rules for the proper folding of the flag, for not letting it touch the ground, and in addition the unwritten rule that it should not be worn on the body below the waist.

Since 1933, only the Norwegian, the Sámi or the local official flags were allowed to fly on top of municipality buildings. Since 2014, the municipalities could hoist a different flag if an event in the building was related to it. In 2021, related to the group gathering restrictions with COVID-19, the government proposed to adapt the legislation so that municipalities do not need to host an event for hoisting a flag.

== Construction sheets ==
National and merchant flag

State and war flag

The proportions of the national flag are 16:22 (height (width) to length), its colour elements having widths of 6:1:2:1:6 and lengths of 6:1:2:1:12. The proportions of the state flag are 16:27, or 6:1:2:1:6 vertically and 6:1:2:1:6:11 horizontally.

The law regarding the Norwegian flag by the Ministry of Foreign Affairs defines the colours as deep red and dark blue (“høirødt” og “mørkeblåt”) and white, with no reference to a specific colour system.

Flag producers normally use the red colour 200 and blue colour 281 from the Pantone colour matching system (note that no suffixes are specified in these PMS values, since the coated C version is normally assumed). These colours for the Norwegian flag were also defined on page 79 of the publication Flags and anthems manual, London 2012, and were used for the summer Olympic games in London 2012. Oslo Orlogsforening also specifies Pantone 200 and 281. The flag manufacturer Langkilde & Søn even refers to Pantone 200 as "Norwegian Red" and Pantone 281 as "Norwegian Blue". As of 2021, the Nordic Council also specifies Pantone 200 and 281.

Other sources have specified different colours for the red and the blue in relation to the Pantone colour matching system (PMS). In a document on the Norwegian government's web pages, the red colour is defined as “Pantone 032 U” and the blue as “Pantone 281 U”. However, Norwegian flag producers consider this red colour to be incorrect, and have complained that the Norwegian state propagates what they perceive as misinformation. For example, it has been argued that Pantone suffixes (such as C and U) only are relevant for print on paper, and thus should not be used to specify flag colours. Norwegian authorities have since clarified that the colours only were an internal recommendation intended specifically for silkscreen printing, and not a legal definition, and has since withdrawn the recommendation. The Nordic Flag Society currently defines the red colour as PMS 186 and the blue as PMS 287. The Nordic Council previously attributed their colours to this source but defined red colour as “Pantone 186 C” (note the C postfix) while the blue was identical to the source (“Pantone 287”). However, in 2010 the same website defined the blue colour as “Pantone 301”.

On 25 April 2018 the Norwegian foreign minister recommended that Norwegian flag manufacturers take initiative to form a technical standard describing a guidance on which colours to use in the flag of Norway, similar to what has been done in Denmark. It was stressed that it is the colour of the finished product that matters, and that this may result in the guide describing different colour codes for fabric, paper and web use.

Due to the vastly different ways colors are reproduced on physical flags versus on digital displays (using web colors), there is naturally no precise RGB equivalent to the Pantone colours. However, a good approximation can be achieved by following the official translation to web colors in the Pantone Formula Guide. With the de facto standard used by Norwegian flag producers being PMS 200 and 281, the corresponding web colors using the official Pantone Matching System is #BA0C2F for PMS 200 (deep red) and #00205B for PMS 281 (dark blue).

Colors scheme	Blue	Red	White
Pantone	287 C	186 C	White
RAL	5002	3024	9016
CMYK	100, 83, 16, 5	11, 100, 85, 2	0-0-0-0
HEX	#003698	#D21034	#FFFFFF
RGB	0, 54, 152	210, 16, 52	255-255-255

== Traditions regarding the flag ==
Flaggappell
A bugle call for hoisting and lowering the flag

=== Music when raising (hoisting) or lowering the flag ===
When raising the Norwegian flag on festive or ceremonial occasions, the hoisting will often be accompanied by a bugle call, fanfare, or the national anthem (Ja, vi elsker). For civilian use on ceremonial occasions, there are no written rules concerning this. The Norwegian armed forces have a unified bugle call for hoisting and lowering the flag, known as flaggappell ('Attention to the flag') (cf. Bugle calls of the Norwegian Army).

=== Code of conduct during flag hoisting and lowering ===
According to Norwegian law as well as common usage, flags of other sovereign states are to be treated with the same respect as the Norwegian flag.

For civilians and non-uniformed government employees, there are no formal hand gestures (e.g. the U.S. hand-over-the-heart gesture; see United States Flag Code) that must be performed. But it is commonly agreed that during the hoisting or lowering of the flag, civilians should conduct themselves in a respectful manner by facing the flag and standing still, straight, and quiet. Males should be bareheaded (unless there are religious, medical, or climatic reasons for covering the head).

All uniformed government personnel (e.g.: municipal traffic wardens, policemen, customs official, prison wardens, maritime pilots, armed forces personnel) follow the Norwegian Armed Forces regulation during flag hoisting or lowering. The regulations stipulate that when seeing the flag being hoisted or lowered, or hearing the bugle call, all activity should if possible be stopped, and personnel should execute the foot drill manoeuvre of "Halt and front face" (stopping up and turning one's body to face the flagpole).

A person must render a salute to the flag when wearing a uniform hat, cap or beret while not in formation. A person in formation or not wearing a prescribed uniform hat, should stand at attention for the duration of the bugle signal, or if in sight of the hoisting or lowering, until the flag is either at the top of the pole, at half mast, or until two thirds of the flag is in the hands of the flag party.

=== Rolling up the flag ===
Unlike the Anglo-American traditions of folding a flag (the triangular shape of the U.S. flag or the square shape of the UK's Union Flag), the Norwegian tradition is to roll the flag into a cylindrical shape and tie it up after lowering it.

The first step of this procedure is to fold the flag lengthwise so that its two long sides meet. Each half will then be folded 180 degrees, concealing the longitudinal white and blue stripes. Finally the folded full length flag, its width 1/4 of the hoist, will be rolled up into a red cylinder.

If the flag is fitted with a line, this is wrapped around the flag and tied with a simple slip knot. The use of a simple slip knot allows one person alone to hoist the flag unaided.

=== Occupation flag ===
When on international missions, Norwegian armed forces may keep a flag (national or merchant flag) raised during the night and illuminated by a spotlight, to affirm their presence and to boost morale.

This tradition stems from World War II, when a small-sized flag was hoisted (usually above the CO quarters) in the numerous camps of Norwegian forces in the UK, USA, Sweden, and Canada, to symbolize that fight against the enemy would go on day and night until final victory.

=== Dishonoured flag ===
Military regulations stipulate that a Norwegian flag shall never touch the ground, since this is disrespectful towards the flag and may signify surrender.

== Symbolism ==
Fredrik Meltzer submitted his proposal just in time to be exhibited in parliament on 4 May 1821 together with a large number of other proposals. It was approved by both chambers during the following two weeks. Meltzer himself provided no written explanation for his choice of design and colours. However, his intentions may be inferred from an earlier letter of 30 April with his comments regarding the proposal from the flag committee. That design was divided quarterly red and white. Meltzer objected to the colours because they were too similar to those of the Danish flag. He added that it would be equally unseemly to choose the colours of any of "those states with which we have been or are connected with". Instead, he recommended a tricolour of red, white and blue, "three colours that now denote freedom, such as we have seen in the French flag of freedom, and still see in that of the Dutch and Americans, and in the Union of the Englishmen".

His eventual choice a few days later of a Nordic cross was clearly based on the tradition established by the other Nordic countries, Denmark and Sweden. This cross represents Christianity. The red and blue colours also explicitly referred to the same two countries, former and present union partners. It was clearly understood by all who took part in the flag discussions locally, in the press or in parliament what those colours denoted. A predominantly red flag had many adherents among those who were attached to the union with Denmark or to its flag, which for centuries had also been that of Norway. Others, who saw Denmark as an oppressor, favoured the blue colour associated with the new Swedish dynasty which was seen as more receptive of Norwegian ambitions of autonomy. Consequently, most of the other flag proposals on the agenda had either red or blue as the predominant colour, depending on the political preferences of the proposers.

== Norwegian flag days ==
- 1 January – New Year's Day
- 21 January – Princess Ingrid Alexandra's birthday
- 6 February – The Sami National Day. (An official flag day both for the Sami people and for the whole of Norway.)
- 21 February – King Harald V's birthday
- 16 March – The Kven National Day. (An official flag day for the Kven people.)
- Easter Sunday
- 1 May – Labour Day
- 8 May – Liberation Day 1945
- 17 May – Constitution Day 1814 (National Day)
- Whitsunday
- 7 June – Union Dissolution Day 1905
- 4 July – Queen Sonja's birthday
- 20 July – King Haakon VIII's birthday
- 29 July – Olsok. (Olav's Mass. In memory of King Olaf Haraldsson (Saint Olaf), who died in the battle of Stiklestad 29 July 1030)
- 19 August – Crown Princess Mette-Marit's birthday
- Second Monday of September every 4 years – General election
- 25 December – 1st Christmas Day

== Chronology ==
*	= Contested

Usage	Type	Design(s)	Note(s)	Dates in use
War*; Naval*	Banner		Reconstruction of the first recorded banner (one of several), the Raven banner, flown by chieftains and rulers in and from Scandinavia.	8th – 10th century
Royal; National; Naval	Heraldic; Banner		Royal Standard of Norway: As a banner of arms, this has been the historical flag of the Old Kingdom of Norway and its kings. Used as the coat of arms from at least 1318, and also as flag-format on ships and fortresses. This flag with the coat of arms of Norway is still in use today by the king of Norway.	13th century – c. 1536 c. 1536 – 1748 → (Denmark–Norway); 1905 – present → (Norway)
Union*	Nordic cross		Probable flag of the Kalmar Union.	c. 1397 – c. 1523 →
Union; Naval	Nordic cross		Flag of Denmark–Norway. From 1748 the only approved merchant flag.	c. 1536 – 1748 → 1748–1814
National; Naval	Nordic cross Canton		Flag of Norway (1814–1821). On ships only north of Cape Finisterre, Spain. On longer distances the two following flags were used.	1814–1821
Naval	Nordic cross		Flag used by Norwegian ships south of Cape Finisterre 1815–1818, optional until 1821.	1815–1821
Naval	Nordic cross Canton		Flag used by Norwegian ships south of Cape Finisterre, Spain 1818–1844. From 1821 it was also used by Swedish ships there.	1818–1844
National; Naval	Nordic cross		Flag of Norway (1821–1844). On ships only north of Cape Finisterre, Spain, until 1838.	1821–1844
National; Union; Naval	Nordic cross Canton		Flag of Norway (1844–1899)	1844–1899
National; Naval	Nordic cross		Flag of Norway (1899–present)	1899–1940; 1940–1945 → (Nazi Germany); 1945 – present

== See also ==
- Coat of arms of Norway
- Great Seal of the Realm
- Flags of Norwegian subdivisions
- List of Norwegian flags
- National anthem of Norway
- Norway in red, white and blue
- Flag of Denmark
- Nordic Cross flag
- Royal Standard of Norway
- Sami flag
- Flag of Sweden
- Union mark of Norway and Sweden
- Flag of Iceland
