= Fredrik Meltzer =

Norwegian businessman, politician

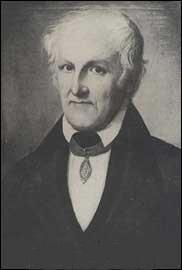
Fredrik Meltzer

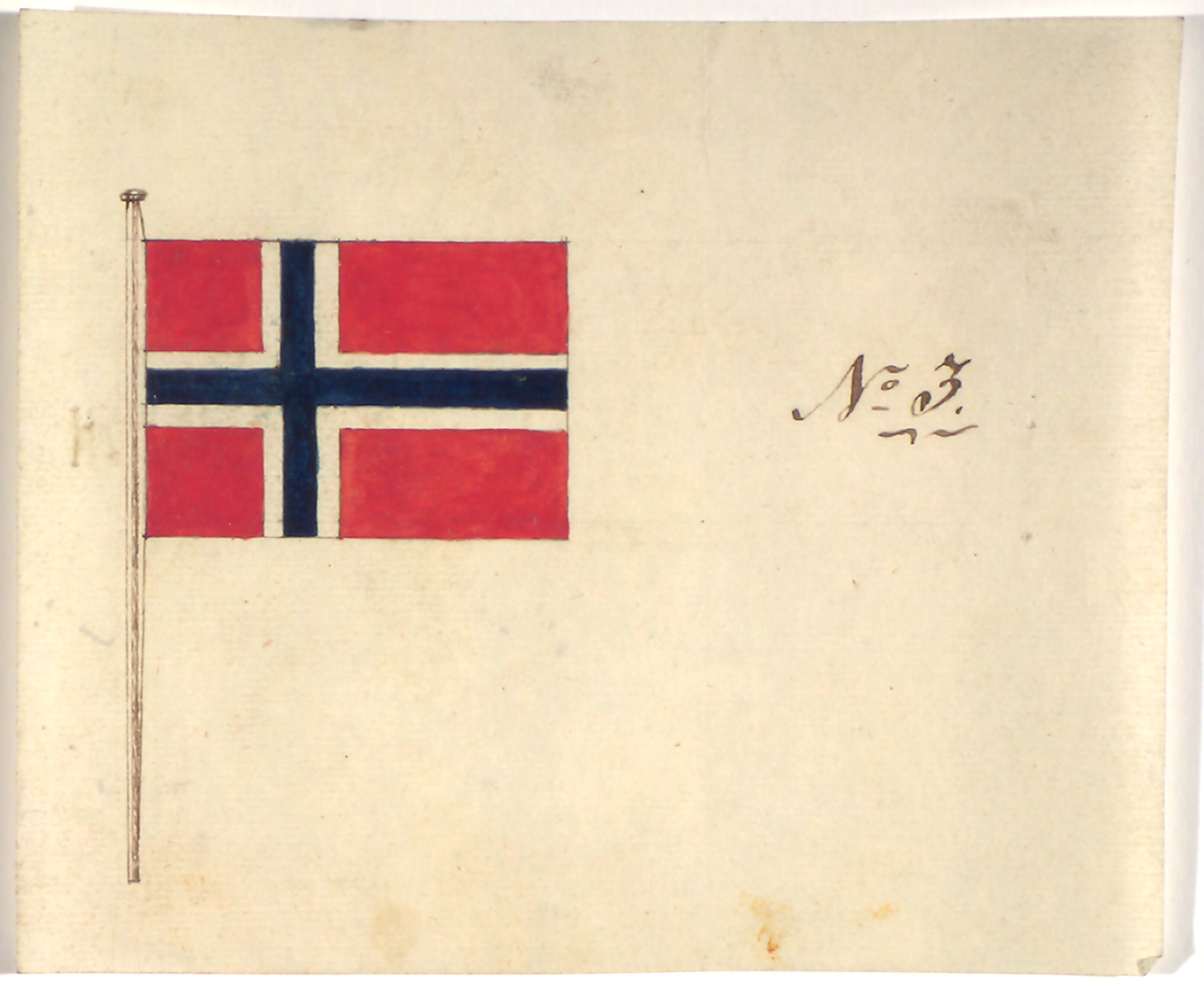
Fredrik Meltzer's 1821 design for the flag of Norway

Fredrik Meltzer (29 September 1779 – 17 December 1855) was a Norwegian businessman and representative at the Norwegian Constitutional Assembly at Eidsvoll in 1814. He is perhaps best known for designing the flag of Norway.

== Biography ==
Fredrik Meltzer was born in Bergen, Norway. Meltzer was from a merchant family with origins in Rödinghausen in the County of Ravensberg (in present-day Westphalia), Germany. Meltzer received a commercial education in London from 1796 to 1798. His education continued with trips during 1800 to 1801 in the Netherlands, France and Germany, after which he joined the family import and export company in Bergen.

He represented the city of Bergen as a member of the Norwegian Constitutional Assembly where he served as a member on several committees. He generally favored the independence Party (Selvstendighetspartiet). Meltzer was one of the signatories of the Norwegian Constitution at Eidsvoll in 1814. Later he represented the city of Bergen in the Norwegian Parliament from 1821 to 1828. From 1813 to 1829, he was also a member of the city council in Bergen and from 1837 to 1849 a member of the Municipal Council.

Meltzer designed the modern flag of Norway in 1821 to replace the modified Danish and Swedish flags then in use. He chose to use a Nordic cross to reflect Norway's close ties with Sweden and Denmark, and the colours red, white and blue in order to symbolize the liberal ideals associated with more or less democratic countries, such as the Netherlands, United Kingdom, United States of America, and revolutionary France.

== Personal life ==
Fredrik Meltzer married Margrethe Stub (1779–1832) in 1802; they had 13 children.

== Related Reading ==
- Holme Jørn (2014) De kom fra alle kanter - Eidsvollsmennene og deres hus (Oslo: Cappelen Damm) ISBN 978-82-02-44564-5
