= Flag of Sweden =

Kingdom of Sweden
- Use: Civil and state flag, civil and state ensign
- Proportion: 5:8
- Adopted: 22 June 1906; 120 years ago
- Design: A blue field charged with a yellow Nordic cross that extends to the edges; the vertical part of the cross is shifted to the hoist side. Dimensions: 5:2:9 horizontally and 4:2:4 vertically.
- Military flag
- Use: War flag and naval ensign
- Proportion: 1:2
- Adopted: Dates back to the mid-17th century. Described in law on 6 November 1663. Current design: 22 June 1906
- Design: Blue with a yellow Nordic cross that extends to the edges of the flag. Overall ratio, including the tails, is 1:2

The national flag of Sweden (Sveriges flagga) consists of a yellow or gold Nordic cross (i.e. a horizontal cross extending to the edges, with the crossbar closer to the hoist than the fly) on a field of light blue. The Nordic cross design traditionally represents Christianity. The design and colours of the Swedish flag are believed to have been inspired by the present coat of arms of Sweden of 1442, which is blue divided quarterly by a cross pattée of gold. Blue and yellow have been used as Swedish colours at least since Magnus III's royal coat of arms of 1275.

== Specifics ==
=== Ratio and colour scheme ===
The Swedish flag is one of only five that use the ratio 5:8, the others being the flags of Argentina, Guatemala, Palau, and Poland.

It is one of only five flags that currently use the colour scheme of blue and yellow, the others being the flags of Kazakhstan, Palau, Ukraine, and the European Union.

=== State flag and civil ensign ===
The dimensions of the Swedish flag are 5:2:9 horizontally and 4:2:4 vertically. The dimensions of the Swedish flag with a triple-tail are 5:2:5:8 horizontally and 4:2:4 vertically. The colours of the flag are officially established through the Natural Color System to be NCS 0580-Y10R for the shade of yellow, and NCS 4055-R95B for the shade of blue. They are also specified to Pantone PMS 301 C/U for blue and PMS 116 or PMS 109 U for yellow. The square-cut Swedish state flag is identical to the civil ensign. The Swedish law does not regulate the design of the Swedish pennant, but it is recommended that its colour scheme should correspond with that of the flag.

Colour values	Blue (Blå)		Yellow (Gul)	
System	NCS	Pantone	NCS	Pantone
Colour name	4055-R95B	301 C	0580-Y10R	116 C
HEX	#005583	#004B87	#FFC200	#FFCD00
RGB	0, 85, 131	0, 75, 135	255, 194, 0	255, 205, 0
CMYK	100, 35, 0, 49	100, 44, 0, 47	0, 24, 100, 0	0, 20, 100, 0

=== Construction sheet ===
Flag construction sheet

=== Naval ensign ===
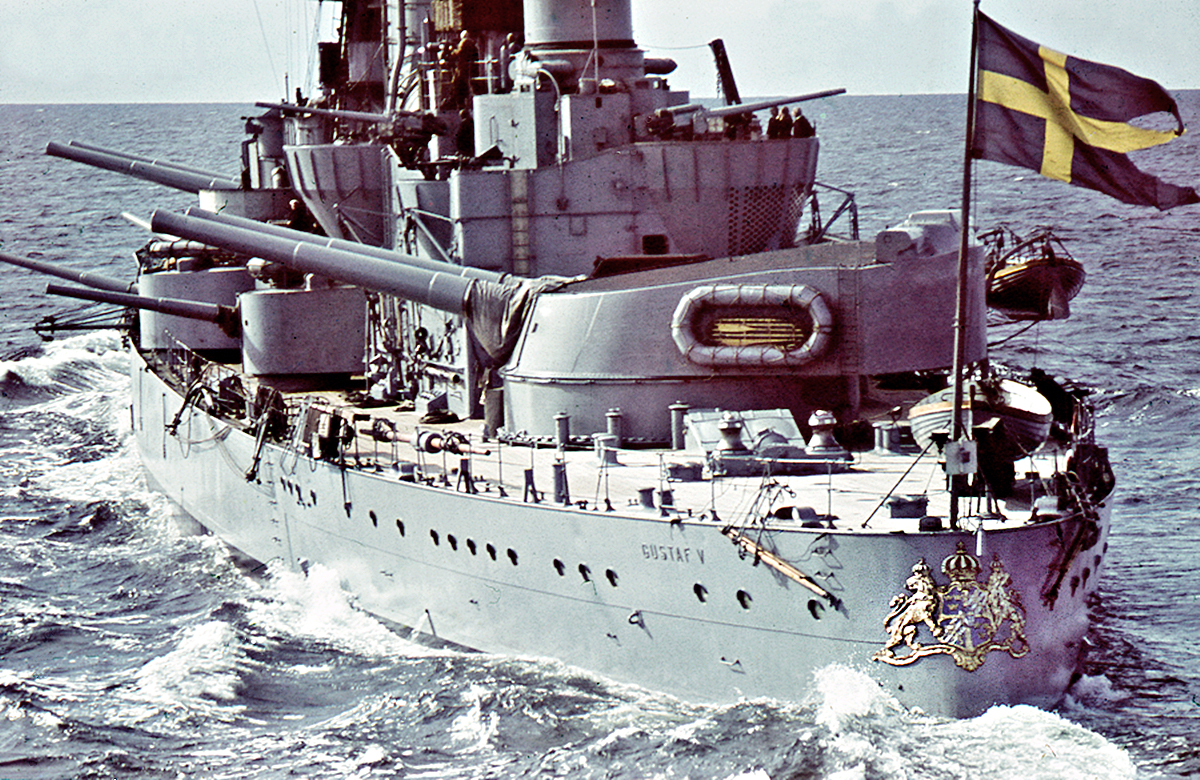
Coastal defence ship HSwMS Gustaf V in 1957, with the current naval ensign, and the greater coat of arms in the stern (Agfacolor)

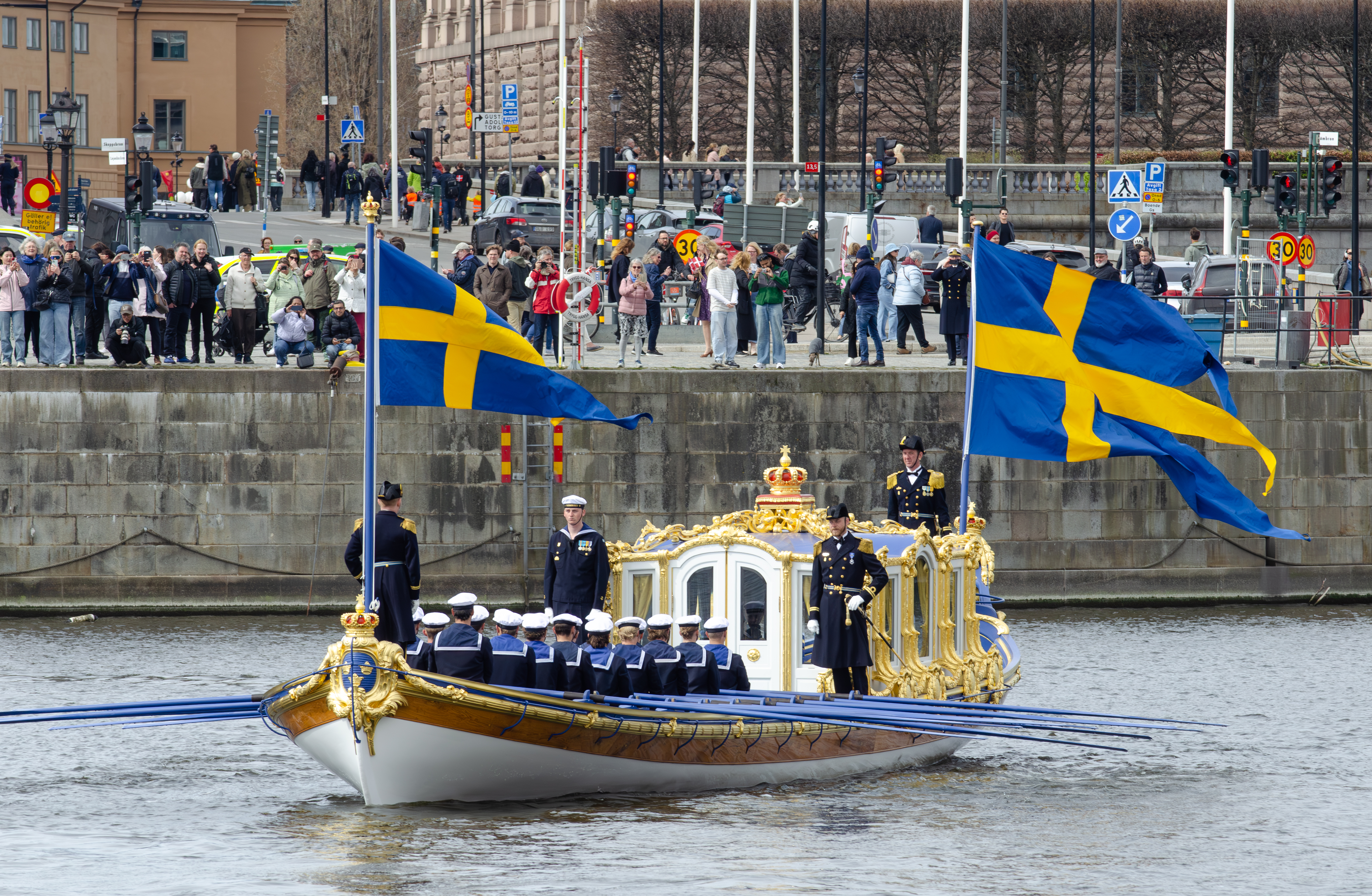
The royal barge, Vasaorden, flying the naval ensign

The triple-tailed flag (tretungad flagga, lit. 'three-tongued flag') is used as a naval ensign (örlogsflaggan). Its overall ratio, including the tails, is 1:2. The flag is also used as the Swedish naval jack (örlogsgösen). The jacks are smaller than the ensigns, but they have the same proportions. The Swedish swallowtail flag was originally the King's personal emblem, or the emblem representing a command conferred by the King. It was at first two-pointed, but by the mid-17th century, the distinctive swallowtail with tongue appeared. The flag is also flown by the defence ministry, while civil ministries fly square flags.

=== Royal flag ===
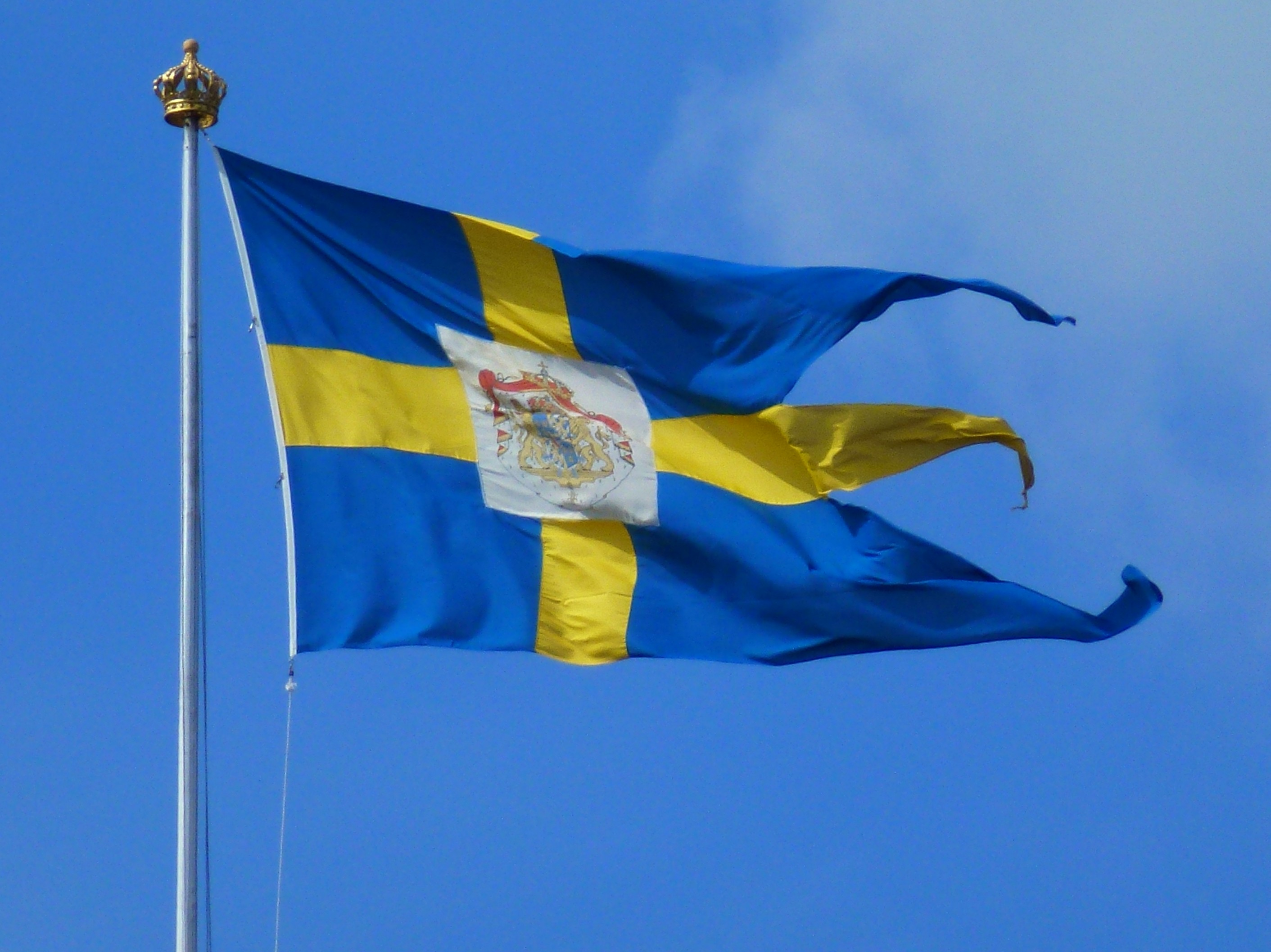
Royal Flag of Sweden flying over the Ulriksdal Palace

The royal flag (kungliga flaggan) is identical to the triple-tailed naval ensign, but has in its centre a white field with the greater or the lesser coat of arms surrounded by the Order of the Seraphim, which has the monarch as its grand master. The monarch personally decides about the specific use of the royal flag.

Royal standard of Sweden with the greater coat of arms, used by the king and queen

Royal standard of Sweden with the lesser coat of arms, used by other members of the Royal House.

Generally, the king and queen use a royal flag with the greater national coat of arms. Other members of the royal house use a royal flag with the lesser national coat of arms. On naval ships the flag of the king is raised together with a split pennant with the greater national coat of arms. Likewise the flag of the heir apparent is raised together with a split pennant with the lesser national coat of arms on naval ships.

The Swedish Marshal of the Realm (Riksmarskalken) has published a series of decisions regarding the royal flag of Sweden. In a decision of 6 April 1987, rules are defined on how to fly the royal flag at the Royal Palace of Stockholm.

- The royal flag with the greater national coat of arms is hoisted at the Royal Palace when H.M. the King is within the realm, and is upholding his duties as the Head of state.
- The royal flag with the lesser national coat of arms is hoisted at the Royal Palace, if by reason of illness, foreign travel or for any other cause, the King is unavoidably prevented from performing his duties; a member of the Royal House under the valid order of succession who is not prevented therefrom, assumes and performs the duties of the Head of State in the capacity of Regent ad interim.
- The "plain" triple-tailed flag (without the coat of arms) is flown at the Royal Palace when the Riksdag has appointed a person to serve, at a Government order, as Regent ad interim when no member of the Royal House under the valid order of succession is in a position to serve. The three-tailed war flag is also flown at the Royal Palace when the Speaker, or, in his unavoidable absence, one of the Deputy Speakers, serves, at a Government order, as Regent ad interim when no member of the Royal House under the valid order of succession is in a position to serve.

Under King Carl XVI Gustaf, king since 1973, the plain triple-tailed flag has flown at the Royal Palace only once. This occurred on 2–3 July 1988, when the King went on a private visit to Wuppertal, West Germany; at the same time, the Duke of Halland, his uncle and the only person in the line of succession, was on a private visit to Sainte-Maxime, France. The government therefore ordered the speaker of the Riksdag, Ingemund Bengtsson, to serve as regent ad interim for two days.

== History ==
=== Royal banners ===
Prior to the adoption of the national Swedish flag featuring the Nordic cross, there were Royal banners, mainly variations of the Royal's personal coat of arms (CoA). It is unclear if proto-heraldry existed in Sweden, but the High Medieval heraldry appears to have begun around the first half of the 13th century.

Many, if not most, CoA:s and royal symbols featured "golden" lions, either prone or upright, with the lion having a crowned head when it represented the sitting regent. The traditional blue field of the Swedish flag appears to have been present during this period, appearing on the CoA of House of Erik (reign: 1150–1220), and House of Bjälbo (reign: 1250–1364). Next to the blue field, three bend sinisters in silver were also standard going forward. These three colors: gold, blue, and silver, could be argued to be the first Swedish national colors. Royal CoA:s could also feature personal details, like red flowers on the CoA of Birger Jarl (Regent of Sweden: 1250–1266), and red hearts on the CoA Magnus Ladulås (King of Sweden: 1255–1275).

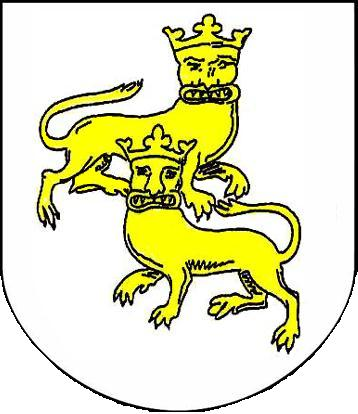
CoA of Erik Knutsson (King of Sweden: 1208–1216)

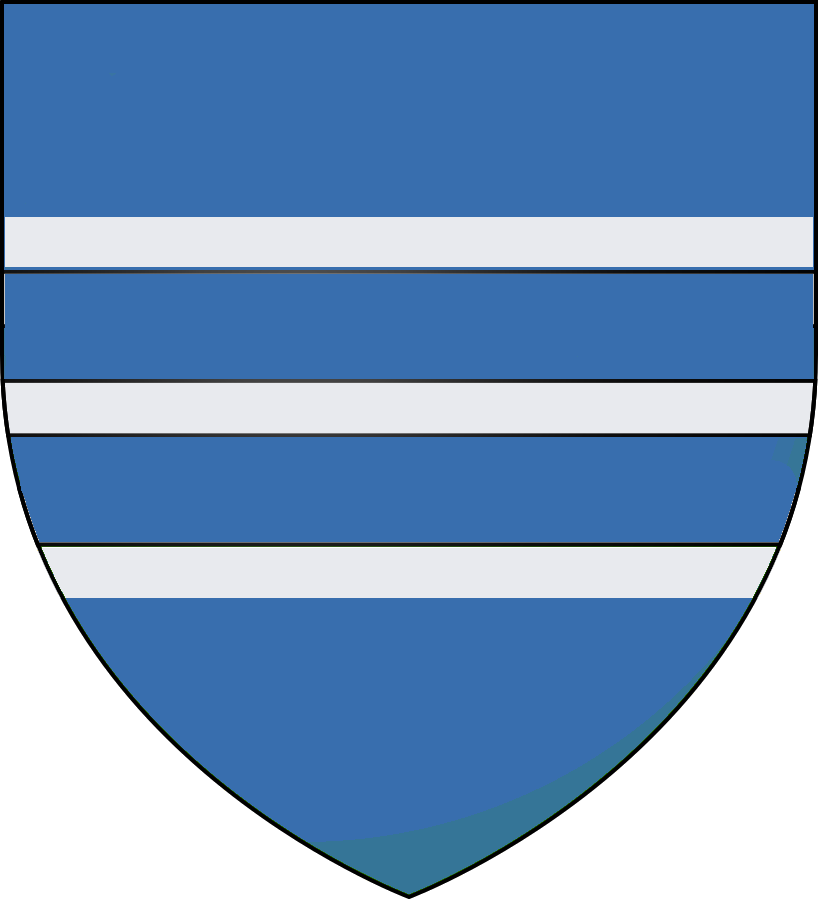
CoA of Holmger Knutsson (throne pretender: 1234–1248)

CoA of Birger Jarl (Regent of Sweden: 1250–1266)

CoA of Magnus Ladulås (King of Sweden: 1255–1275)

Coat of arms of Gothenburg with the archaic heraldry.

The bend sinisters in silver were used in various CoA:s and flags into the early modern period, still surviving in the Coat of arms of Sweden, and various others, such as the Coat of arms of Gothenburg. However, the bend sinisters started falling away as a National heraldic symbol due to the spread of the National emblem of Sweden, the Three Crowns, which features three golden crowns on a blue background since at least 1336. This ultimately sidelined silver as a national color of Sweden.

Royal banner of Birger Jarl (c. 1257) per his insignia

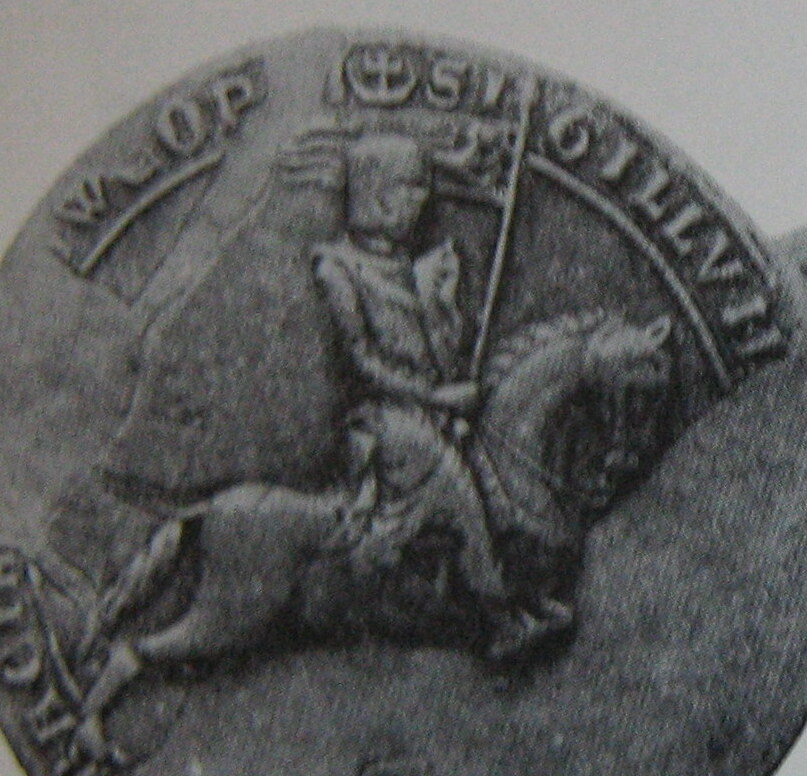
Insignia of Birger Jarl (c. 1257), depicting a triple-tailed lion banner

Royal banner of Magnus Ladulås (c. 1270) per his CoA

Banner with the Coat of arms of Sweden (c. 14 c. onwards)

=== Nordic cross flag ===
The exact age of the Swedish flag featuring the Nordic cross is not known. Other cross flags, such as the Flag of Denmark, Flag of England, Flag of Constantinople, etc, started appearing already in the 13th century, and most likely influenced the Swedish flag design.

According to early modern legend and popular folklore, the 12th-century King Eric IX saw the sun shine against a golden cross in the sky (alternatively the sun shined like a cross) as he landed in Finland during the First Swedish Crusade in 1157. Seeing this as a sign from God he adopted the golden cross against a blue background as his banner.

The oldest recorded pictures of a blue cloth with a yellow cross date from the early 16th century, during the reign of King Gustav I. The first legal description of the flag was made in a royal warrant of 19 April 1562 as: "yellow in a cross fashioned on blue" (gult udi korssvijs fördeelt påå blott). As stipulated in a royal warrant of 1569, the yellow cross was always to be borne on Swedish battle standards and banners. Prior to this, a similar flag appeared in the coat of arms of King John III's duchy, which is today Southwest Finland. The same coat of arms is still used by the province.

A potential predecessor to the Swedish flag with the Nordic cross could be the coat of arms of Sweden, introduced during the reign of King Charles VIII in 1448. The national coat of arms is a combination of King Albert's coat of arms of 1364 and King Magnus III's coat of arms of 1275, and is blue divided quarterly by a golden cross pattée. Other ideas claim that the Swedish flag was blue with a white cross before 1420, and became blue with a golden cross a century later during the early reign of King Gustav I.

Royal coat of arms, created by King Karl in 1448. It has served as template for Sweden's greater coat of arms since

Coat of arms of Prince John as Duke of Finland 1556–1563, with the two-pointed Swedish ensign in the lower right-hand quadrant

Swallow-tailed cross flag (1562–1650)

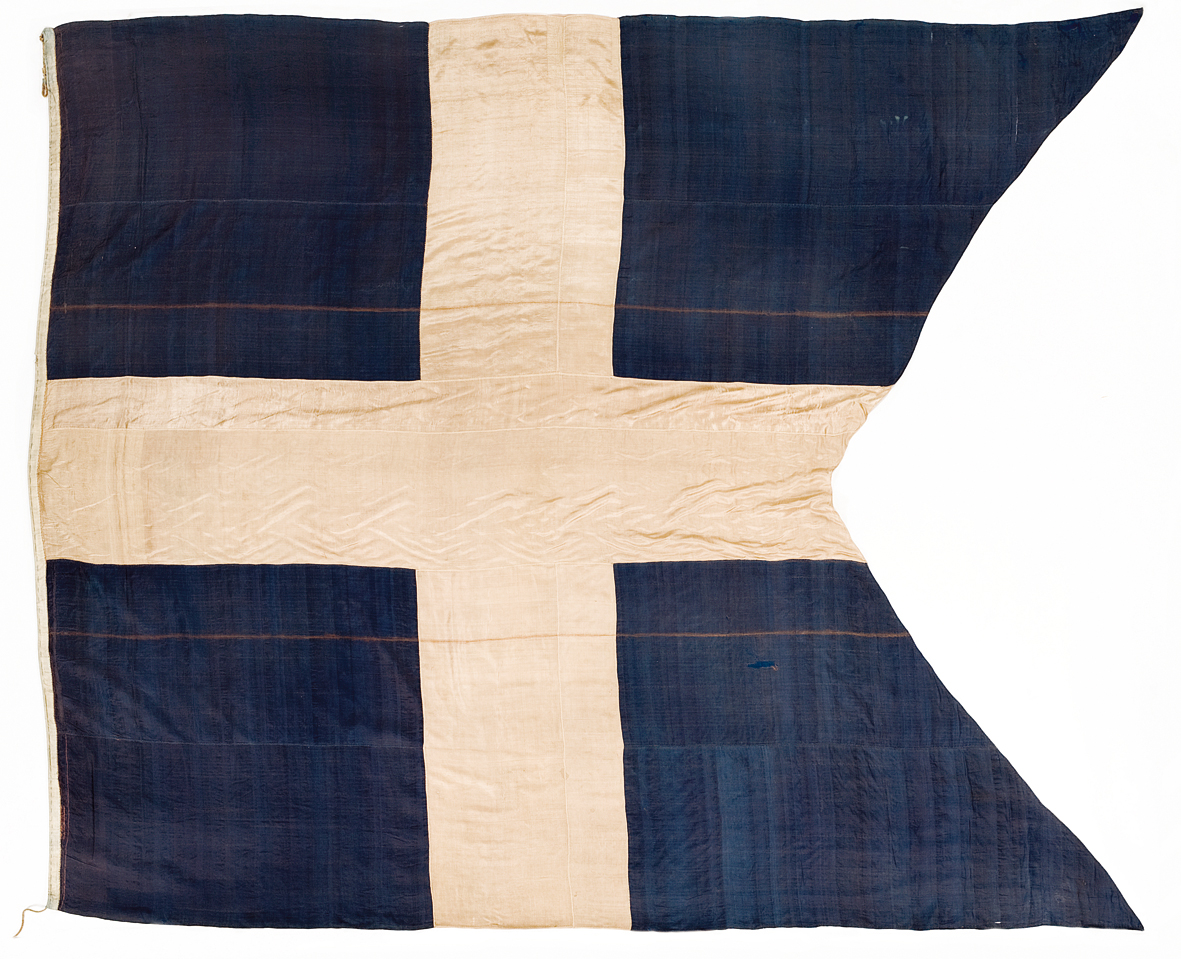
Early variant of state flag and war ensign. This design was also used by the Swedish East India Company

==== Striped flags ====
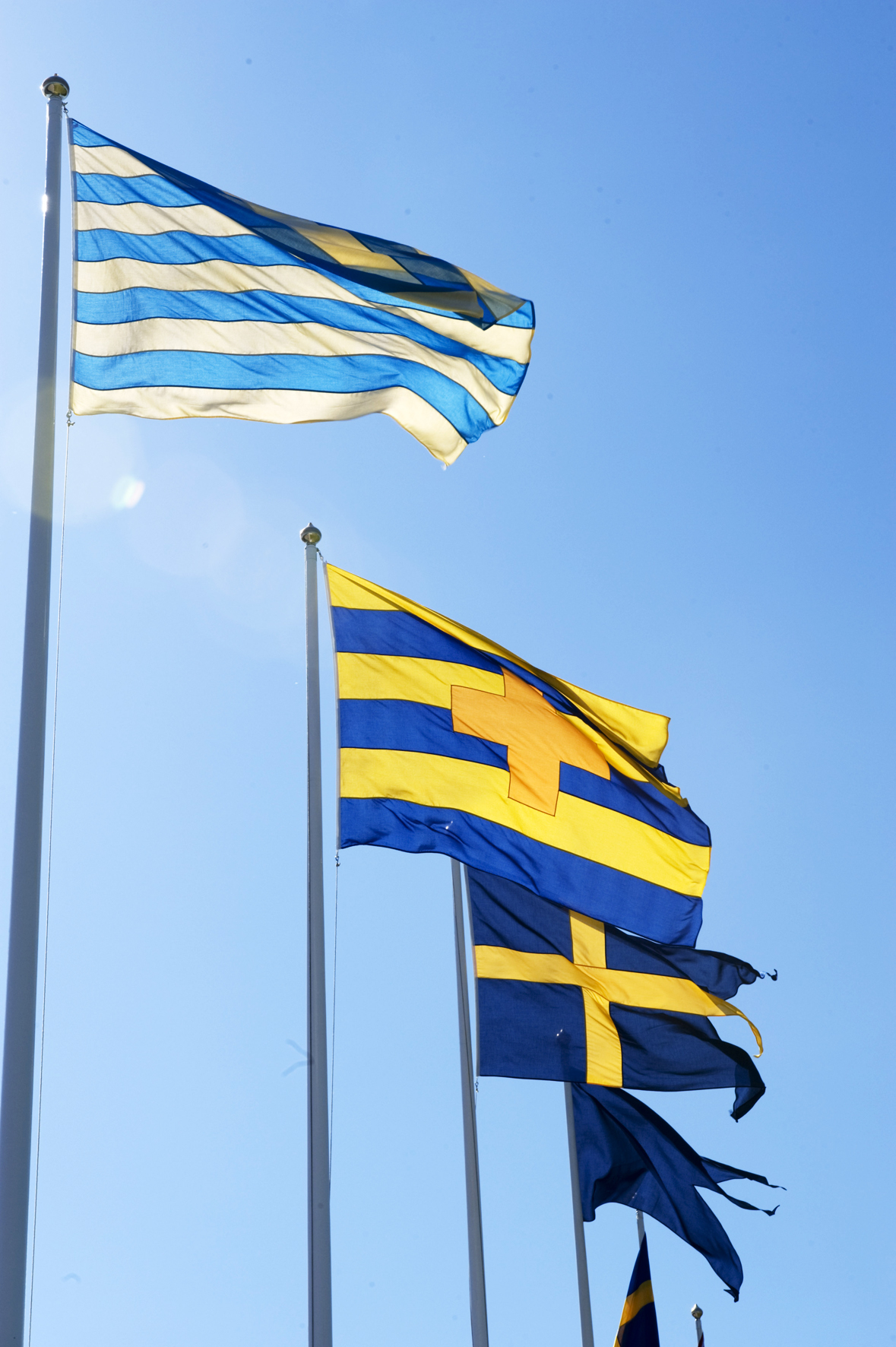
Swedish historic maritime flags at the Stockholm Maritime Museum

Some of the first post-Kalmar Union flags used by the Swedish military featured wavy stripes on a blue field derived from the old bend sinisters on the Royal CoA:s. During the mid 16th century, one of these striped flags is depicted featuring a Nordic cross.

Swedish striped cross banner (c. 1565)

Swedish swallow-tailed striped cross flag (1565)

Swedish silver-striped marine flag (c. 16th–17th c.)

Swedish striped navy flag, illustrated 1585

Swedish gold-striped marine flag (c. 16th–17th c.)

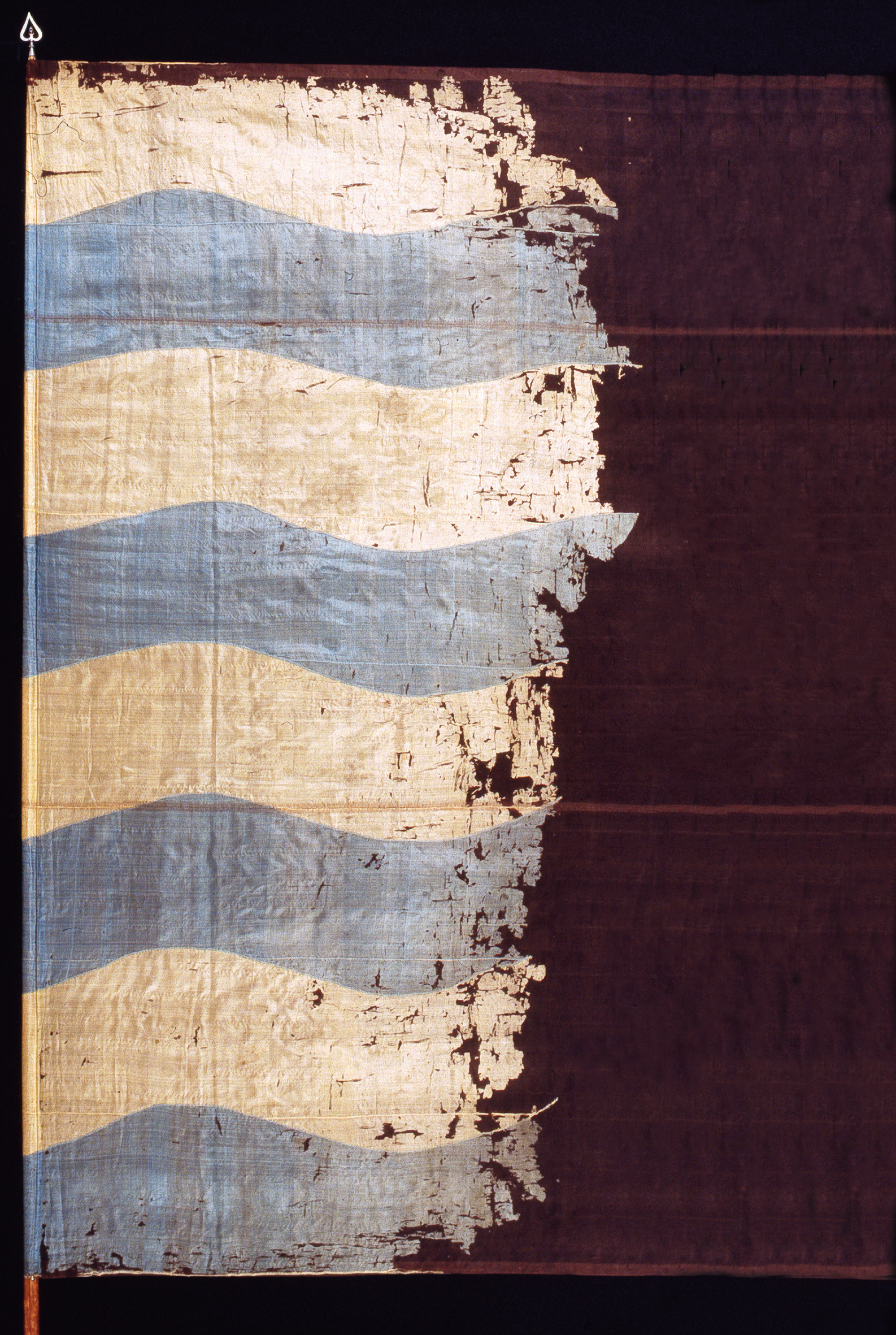
Swedish striped marine banner from 1620

==== Triple-tailed flag ====
A royal warrant of 6 November 1663, regulated the use of the triple-tailed flag, to be used only as a state flag and naval ensign. According to the same royal warrant, merchant ships were only allowed to fly square-cut city flags in their respective provincial colours. In practice, however, the merchant fleet began using a square-cut civil ensign of the state flag. In a government instruction of ship building of 1730, this civil ensign should have the same proportions and colors as the state flag, with the notable difference of being square-cut. In 1756, the use of pennants by private ships was prohibited.

==== Blue ensign ====
A royal warrant of 18 August 1761, stipulated that an all blue triple-tailed flag to be used by the archipelago fleet, a branch of the army tasked with defending the archipelago along the Swedish coastlines. The commander of the fleet also had the right to order the use of the ordinary war ensign instead of the blue ensign when that was "appropriate". The blue flag was used until 1813.

=== Union between Sweden and Norway ===
==== Union flags of 1815 and 1818 ====
On 6 June 1815, a common military ensign was introduced for the two united kingdoms of Sweden and Norway. This flag was identical to the former triple-tailed military ensign of Sweden, with a white saltire on red to be included in the canton. Proposed by the Norwegian Prime Minister and unionist Peder Anker, the white saltire on a red background was supposed to symbolise Norway, as the country had previously been united with Denmark and initially continued to use the same flag as an independent country, but with the national arms in the canton.

Norwegian ships continued to use the Danish civil ensign distinguished with the national arms in the canton north of Cape Finisterre, but had to fly the Swedish civil ensign in the Mediterranean to be protected from pirate attacks. A common civil ensign for both countries was introduced in 1818, on the pattern of the naval ensign, but square-cut. This flag was optional for Swedish vessels, but compulsory for Norwegian ones in distant waters. In 1821, Norway adopted a new national civil ensign, identical to the present flag of Norway.

Swedish and Norwegian civil ensign 1818–1844, with the saltire on red in the canton symbolizing Norway

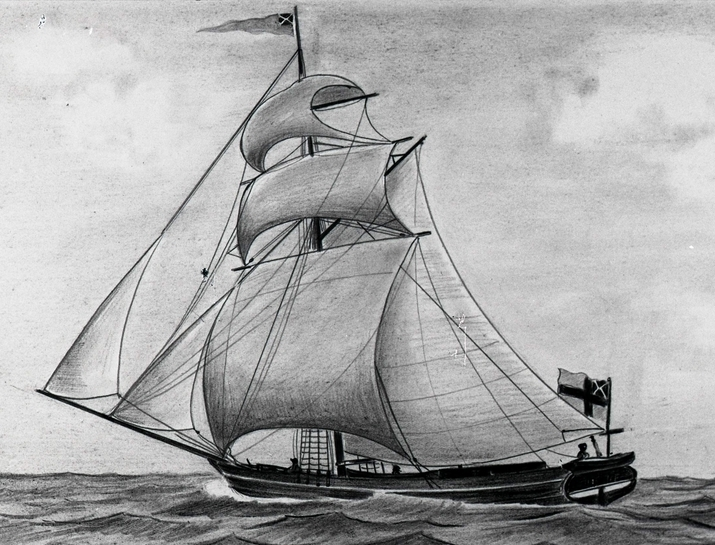
Swedish sloop with the early Union flag and pennant (1822)

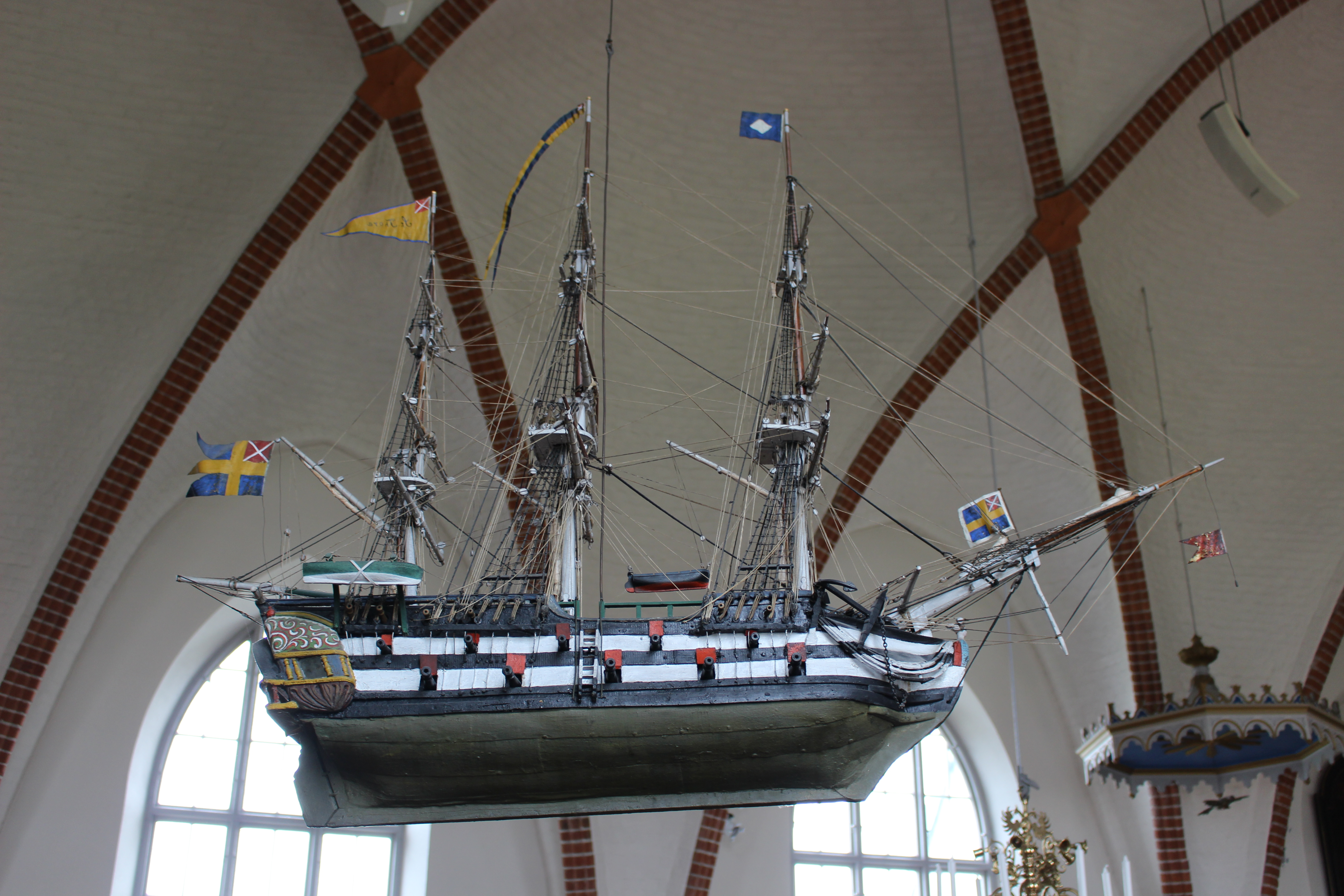
Modelship with the early Union flag and pennant, in Torekov church

Following the adoption of a separate Norwegian flag, a royal regulation of 17 July 1821, stipulated that ships of both kingdoms use the common square-cut civil ensign (with the saltire included) in "distant waters" (i.e. beyond Cape Finisterre). In "distant waters", they had the right to use any of the square-cut civil ensigns of their respective countries, or the uniform Union civil ensign. This system was in force until 1838.

==== Union flags of 1844 ====
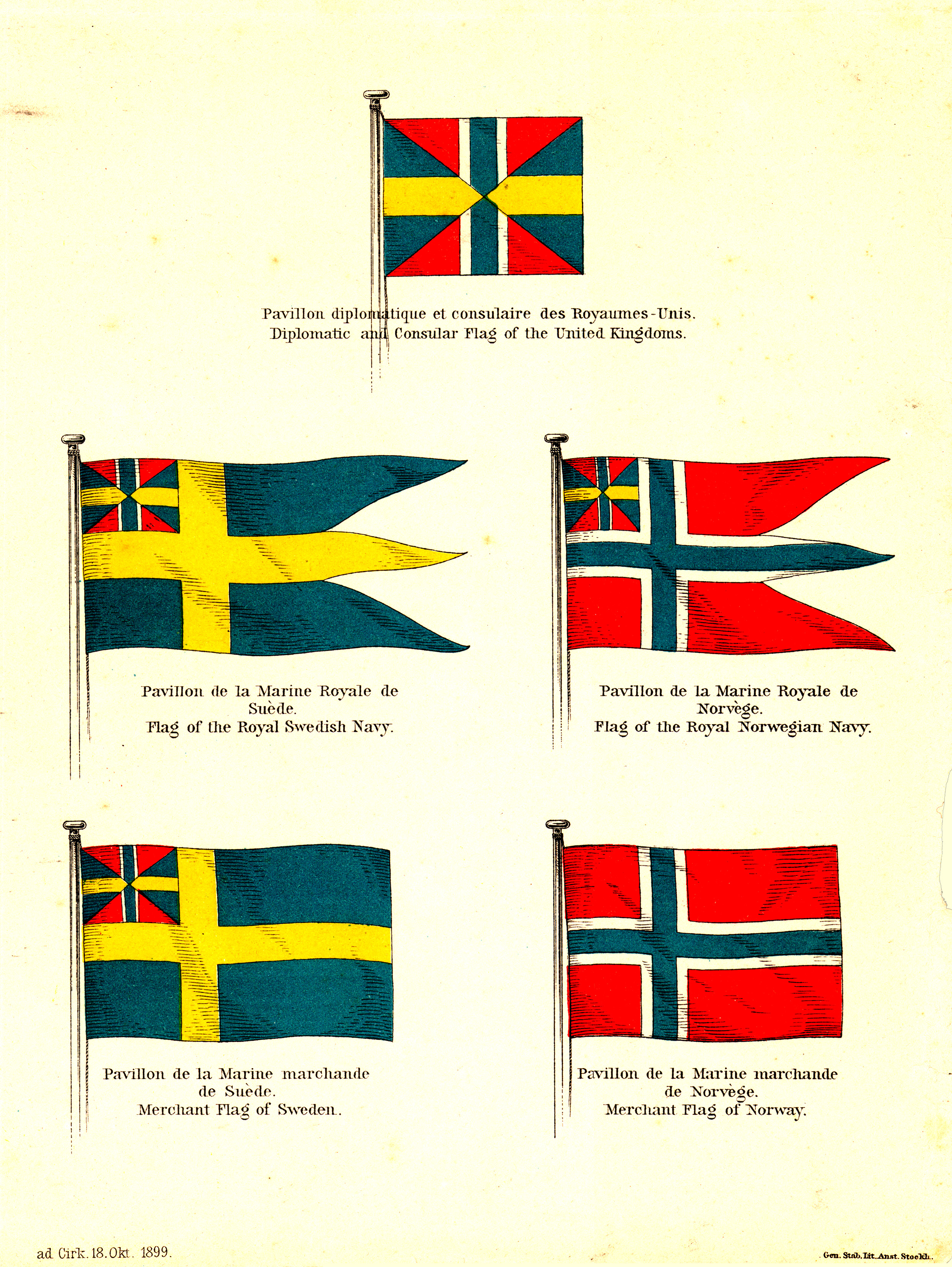
Flags of Sweden and Norway in 1899, after the removal of the union mark from the Norwegian merchant flag. Plate published by the Swedish-Norwegian foreign ministry to announce the recent change.

A royal resolution of 20 June 1844, introduced new flags and heraldry to denote the equal status of the two kingdoms within the union. Both countries were granted civil and military ensigns on the same pattern, their respective national flags with the addition of a union mark in the canton, combining the flag colours of both countries. The naval ensign was based on the traditional triple-tailed Swedish model.

Swedish civil ensign 1844–1905, with the union mark in the canton

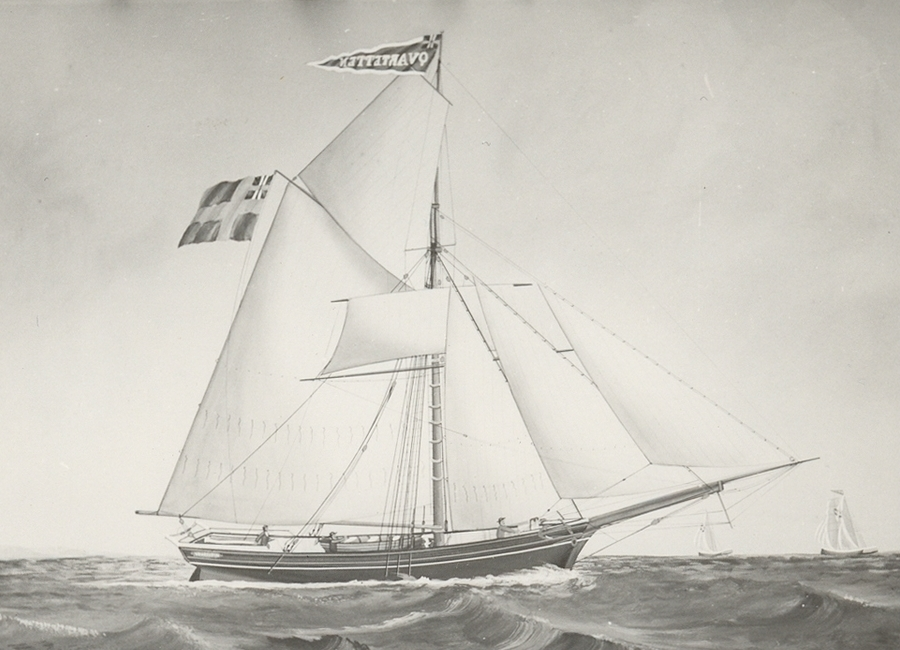
Swedish sloop with the later Union flag, and pennant featuring the union mark (1886)

Naval ensign of Sweden with union mark 1844–1905

In addition, the new union mark was to be used as the naval jack and as the flag for the common diplomatic representations abroad. The warrant also stipulated that the merchant fleet use their respective countries' square-cut civil ensigns, including the new union mark. Also, royal ensigns were introduced for both countries, their respective naval ensigns with the union mark, with the addition of the union arms at the center of the cross.

Union mark of Swedish flags 1844–1905 (5:4). (Note: Norwegian flags had a square union mark.) Also the common naval jack and diplomatic flag of both.

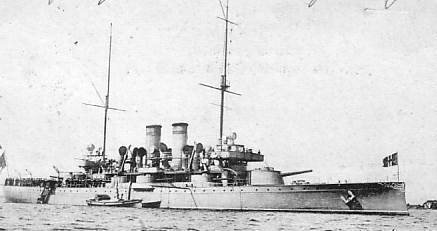
Swedish coastal defence ship HSwMS Wasa displaying the common union jack (1903)

The new union flags were well received by the Norwegians, who had demanded their own military ensign since the union was formed. In Sweden, however, the new union mark in particular became quite unpopular and was contemptuously nicknamed the Sillsallaten (Swedish) or Sildesalaten (Norwegian) after a colorful dish of pickled herring, decorated with red beets and apples in a radial pattern. It is believed that the name was first used in a speech by Lord Brakel in the Swedish House of Lords in Stockholm.

During the 19th century, a number of regulations were issued regarding the use of Swedish flags. The military ensign was also to be used by civil government ships and buildings, such as the Customs, Harbor pilots and the Royal Mail. For this use, the military ensign would have a white field included with a golden marker: For the Harbor pilots (as of 1881, based on a proposal of 1825) an anchor with a star; for the Customs (as of 1844) the letter "T" topped a royal crown; for the Royal Mail (as of 1844) a postal horn with a royal crown. On 7 May 1897, an alternate state flag was introduced. This double-tailed flag was used by government owned ships and buildings, which did not fly the triple-tailed military ensign.

During the late 19th century, increasing Norwegian dissatisfaction with the union led to the demand for a return to the "pure" flag of 1821 without the union mark. Opponents of the union began to use this flag several years before it was officially recognised. During the 1890s, two consecutive sessions of the Norwegian parliament voted to abolish the mark, but the decision was overruled by royal veto. However, in 1898, when the flag law was passed for the third time, the king had to sanction it. On 12 October 1899, the union mark was removed from the Norwegian civil ensign. As the Norwegian military ensign according to the constitution of 1814 was to be a union ensign, the union mark remained on military flags until the dissolution of the union with Sweden. "Pure" military ensigns were hoisted on fortresses and naval vessels on 9 June 1905.

The union mark, however, remained a part of the Swedish flag until 1905, when a Law of 28 October 1905, stipulated the removal of the union mark as of 1 November 1905.

=== The 1906 flag law ===
Following the dissolution of the union in 1905, the triple-tailed naval ensign also became the Swedish naval jack, replacing the common naval jack. The Flag law of 22 June 1906 further regulated the use and design of the flag, specifying the colours to be "ljust mellanblå" (light medium blue) and "guldgul" (golden yellow), a departure from the, at the time, common darker "black-blue" shade, and a return to what was said to be a more historically accurate lighter shade. The Swedish state flag became identical to the square-cut civil ensign, and all private use of the triple-tailed ensign was prohibited.

Common appearance of the Swedish civil ensign, from 1 November 1905 to 21 June 1906

Colour specification of the Swedish flag in 1906

Swedish civil ensign, from 22 June 1906 onward

=== Private use of the state flag ===
There have been a few notable exemptions regarding the prohibition of private parties to use the state flag. All these privileges were terminated in accordance with the new specific flag regulation of 22 June 1906.

- According to a royal warrant of 31 October 1786, the Swedish East India Company had the right to use the triple-tailed war ensign in "Indian waters", when not being under immediate protection by the Swedish navy. In the merchant fleet, there was a common practice to illegally use the war ensign to indicate that the ship was armed.
- In 1838, it was decided that private ships contracted by the Royal Mail were to fly a double-tailed flag.
- On 27 February 1832, the Royal Swedish Yacht Club received the right to use the triple-tailed war ensign, including a centre white field with a golden "O" topped with a duke's crown (as of 1878 a royal crown).
- On 7 June 1893, the Royal Gothenburg Yacht Club received the right to use the triple-tailed military ensign, including a centered white field with the golden "G K S S" topped with a star.

== Use outside Sweden ==
The flag of Sweden appears in coat of arms of Finland's province Southwest Finland.

The flag of Wilmington, Delaware in the United States is modelled after the Swedish flag in remembrance of the short-lived colony of New Sweden, with the cross affixed with the seal of the city. The flag of Philadelphia, Pennsylvania, which also lies within historic New Sweden, is a vertical triband rather than a Nordic Cross, but the blue and yellow colours of the flag were chosen to commemorate the Swedish settlement of the region. According to a legend, the Argentine football team Boca Juniors' flag and colours were inspired by the flag of Sweden.

The seal of the Municipal Council of Shanghai International Settlement incorporated the 1844 Swedish civil ensign.

Flag of New Castle, Delaware

Flag of Philadelphia, Pennsylvania

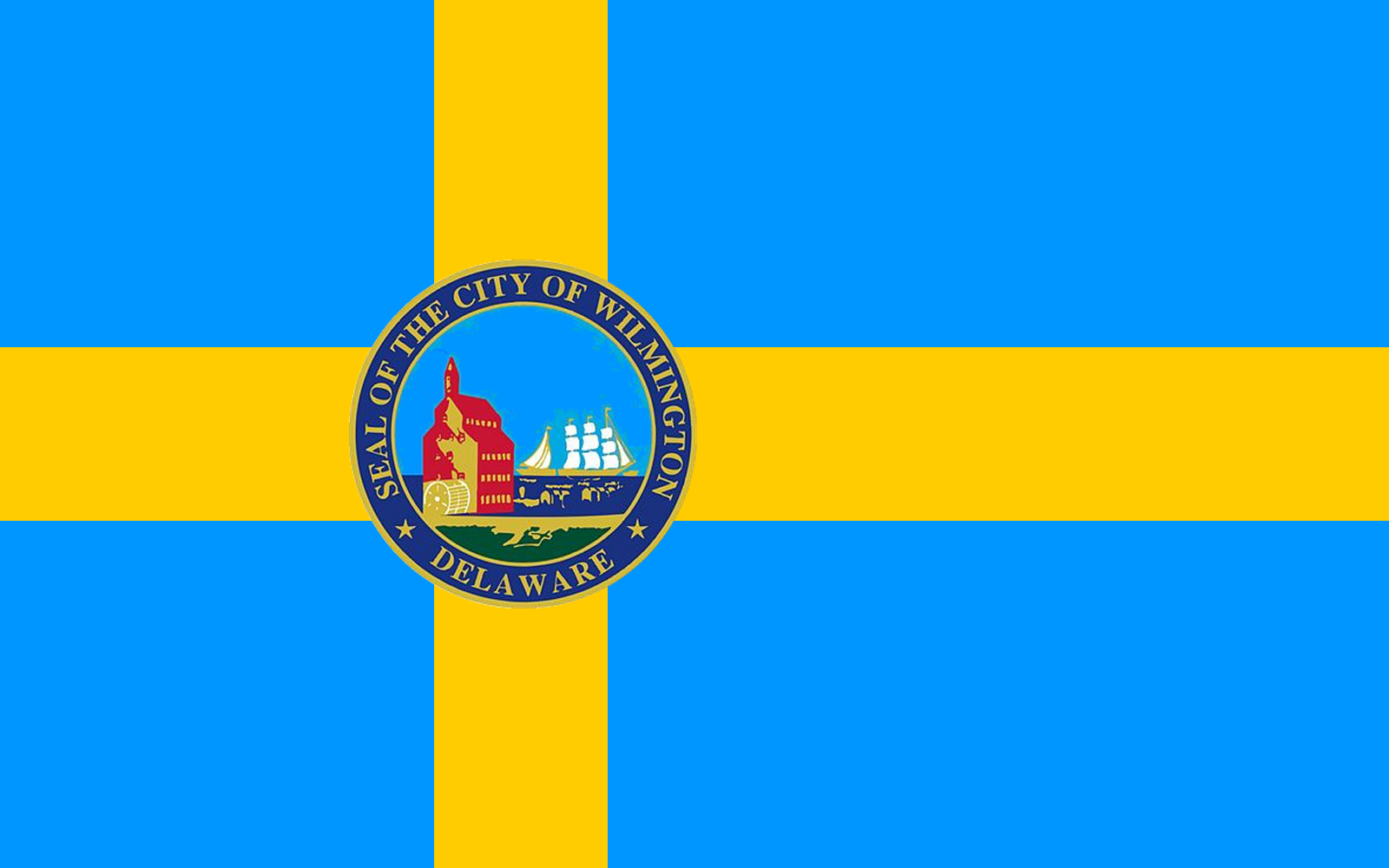
Flag of Wilmington, Delaware

== Rules for displaying the Swedish flag ==
When used from a stand-alone flagpole, the size of the flag is recommended to have a width equalling a fourth of the height of the pole. When used from a flagpole extending from a building, the flag is recommended to have a width equalling a third of the height (length) of the pole.

The times and rules for raising and lowering the Swedish flag are as follows:

- Between 1 March and 31 October the flag can be raised from 08:00.
- Between 1 November and 28/29 February the flag can be raised from 09:00.
- The flag shall be taken down at sunset but at the latest 21:00.
- If the flag is illuminated, it may remain up even after the sun has set.

If the flag is no longer in presentable condition it should be discarded by burning in a respectful manner or returned to the manufacturer for disposal.

Private citizens are not obliged to fly the flag on official flag flying days, but they are encouraged to do it. Apart from the flag flying days in Sweden, everyone is of course able to hoist the flag whenever there is a reason for celebration in the family or otherwise.

== Pennant ==
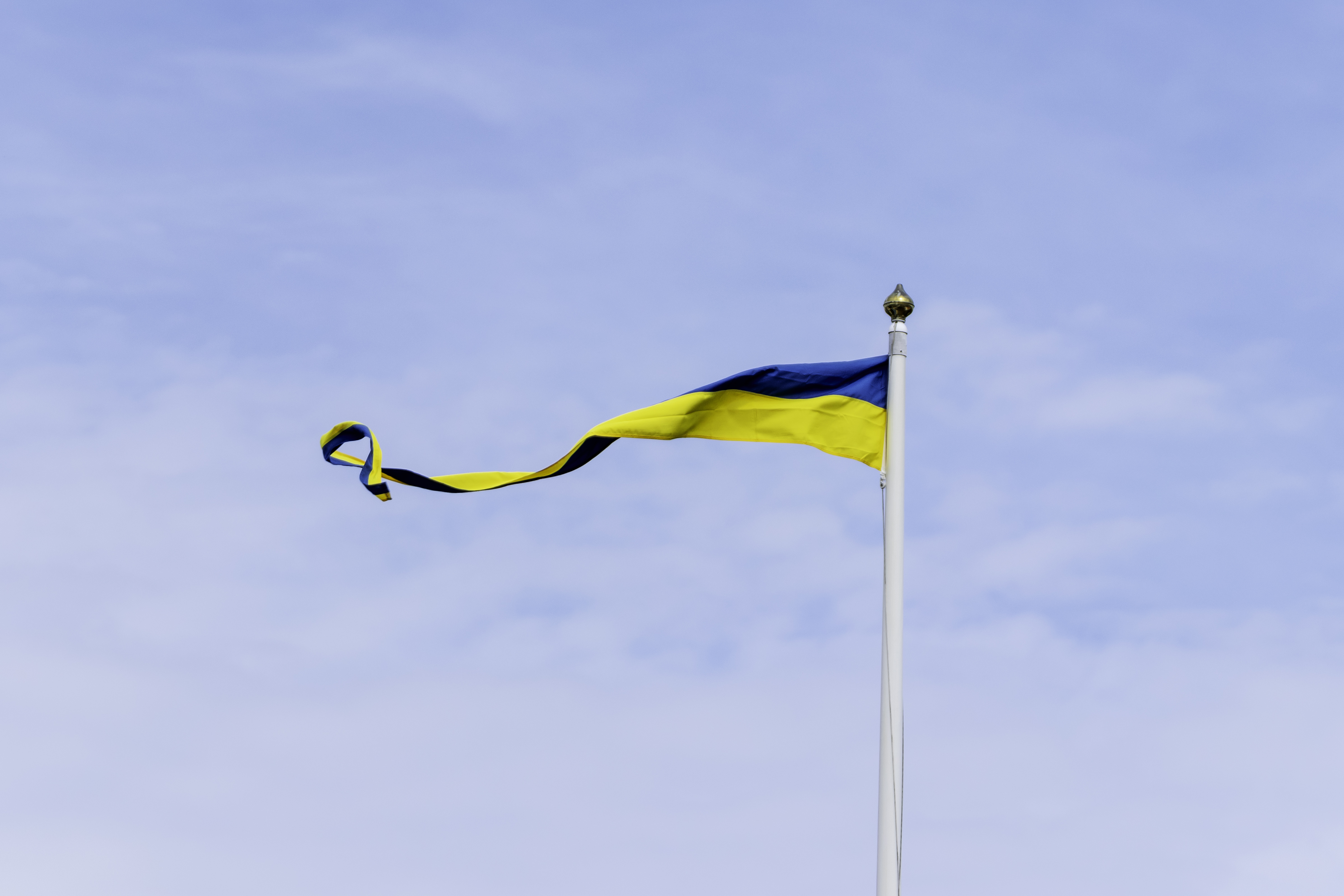
Swedish pennant flying

The Swedish pennant is shaped like an isosceles triangle (to prevent fraying, it is sometimes shaped like an isosceles trapezoid), consisting of two horizontal bands with blue at the top and yellow at the bottom. The National Archives of Sweden recommends its length to be 1/3 the height of the flag pole. There is also an unofficial version of the pennant which resembles the national flag, with a yellow cross on a blue field, which is advised not to be used.

Swedish pennant

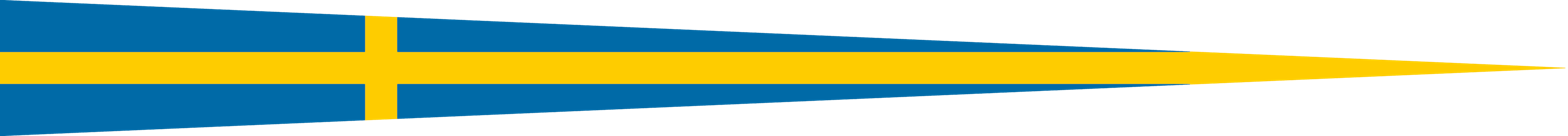
Unofficial version with cross

== See also ==
- Coat of arms of Sweden
- Flag flying days in Sweden
- List of flags of Sweden
- Nordic cross flag
- Union mark of Sweden and Norway
- Flag of Denmark
- Flag of Iceland
