= Flag of Philadelphia =

City of Philadelphia
- Proportion: 3:5
- Adopted: 1895
- Design: A vertical triband with blue (left and right) and yellow (middle), with the coat of arms of Philadelphia in the center
- Designed by: Dr. Henry C. McCook
- Use: Civil ensign
- Proportion: 3:5
- Design: A vertical triband with blue (left and right) and yellow (middle), with the City crest within a circle of thirteen blue stars

The flag of Philadelphia is a blue and yellow triband featuring the arms of Philadelphia.

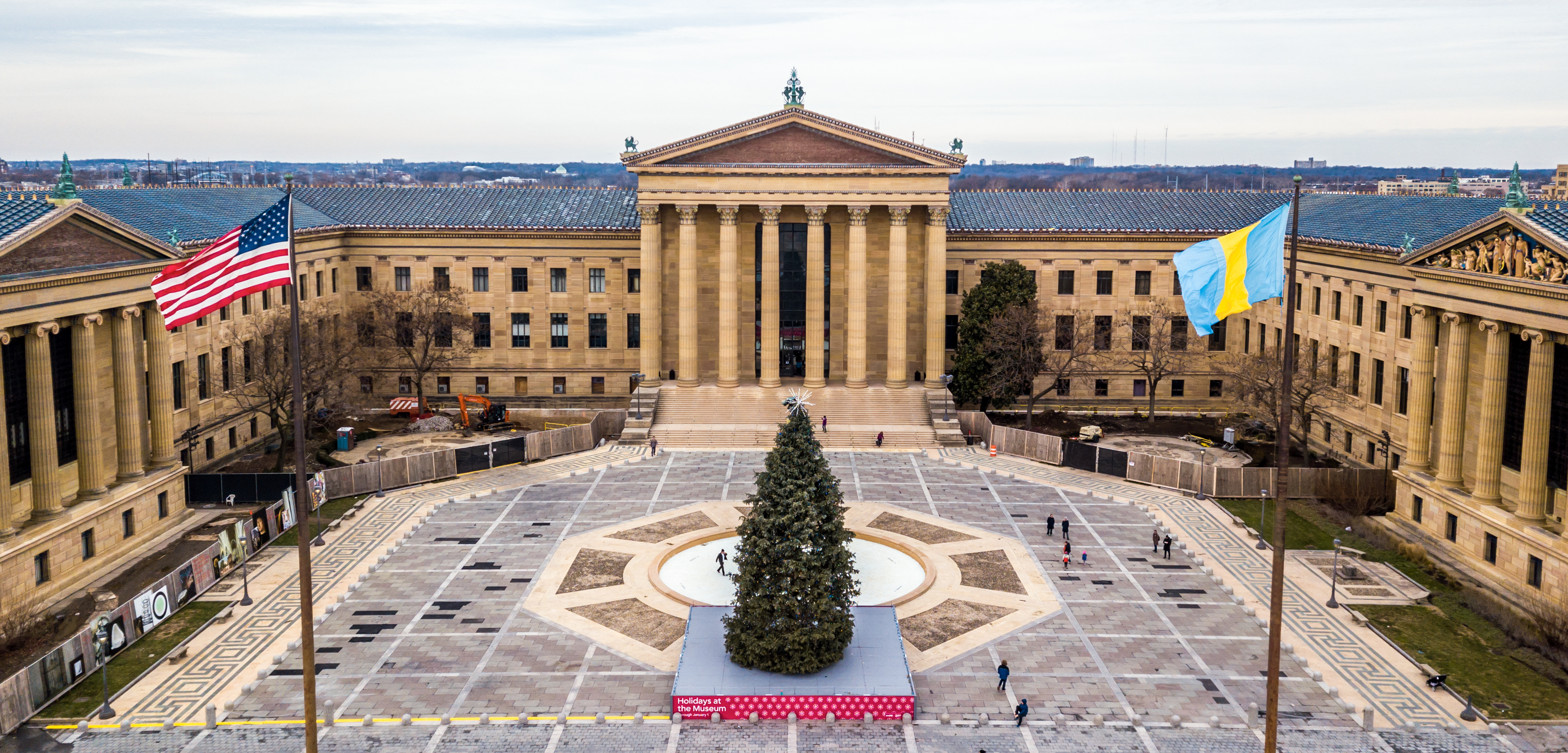
The flag of the United States and the flag of Philadelphia at the Philadelphia Museum of Art.

== Flag ==
The first city flag was made for the Vienna Exposition in 1873, it was described as bearing the city's coat of arms.

The city's flag was officially adopted on March 27, 1895, described in the city's ordinance and is the municipal flag of the city of Philadelphia. The flag is a yellow-on-blue bicolor vertical triband defaced with the arms of the city; the Philadelphia City Code defines the flag as "divided vertically in 3 equal parts, of which the first and third shall be azure blue and the middle pale golden yellow" with the city seal on the center of the yellow stripe; flags displayed by entities other than the municipal government often omit the seal. The dimensions of the flag are "10 feet long and 6 feet wide, or similar proportions". Official but seldom seen variations include a Merchant Flag, Pennant, and Streamer. The blue and yellow colors commemorate the original Swedish colonization of Philadelphia. One flag manufacturer who supplies flags to the city government stated that the shade of blue used is "UN Blue" (the same shade used in the United Nations flag).

The flag in the UN blue variant.

== Coat of arms ==
The current version of the coat of arms was designed mainly by Colonel Frank Marx and adopted by City Council on February 14, 1874. According to the City Code, the city seal is "ARMS -- On a blue field, a fess golden between a plough above and a ship in full sail below; both proper. CREST -- A right arm, nude, embowed, couped at shoulder, holding a pair of scales; all proper. SUPPORTERS -- Two females, standing full face, the one on the left side of the shield habited white and purple, crowned with an olive wreath; in her right hand a scroll, charged with an anchor; all proper; the one on the right side habited white and blue; in her left hand a cornucopia, proper. MOTTO -- PHILADELPHIA MANETO."

Four guiding principles of the City are found on the flag: peace, hope, abundance, and justice. The figure on the left with the olive wreath and scroll with anchor signifies peace and hope respectively. The figure on the right with cornucopia symbolizes abundance or prosperity. Above the shield appears a bent arm, holding the scales of justice and mercy.

== See also ==
- Flag of Sweden
- Philadelphia Eagles#Logo and uniforms (in seventh paragraph, regarding throwback jersey)
