= Union mark of Sweden and Norway =

The union mark with proportions 5:4 used in Swedish flags

The square union mark used in Norwegian flags

The union mark of Sweden and Norway (Swedish: unionsmärket or unionstecknet, Norwegian: unionsmerket) was a symbol of the Union between Sweden and Norway. It was inserted into the canton of the Swedish and Norwegian national flags from 1844 to denote the partnership of the two countries in a personal union. The mark combined the flag colours of both kingdoms, equally distributed, to reflect their equal status within the union. The stand-alone design of the mark was used for the diplomatic flag and the naval jack of the union. The union mark remained part of the flags of both countries until it was removed from the merchant and state flags of Norway in 1899 because of increasing Norwegian dissatisfaction with the union. It remained on the naval ensign of Norway and all Swedish flags until the dissolution of the union between Norway and Sweden in 1905.

== Background ==
The Union of Sweden and Norway came about as a result of the Napoleonic Wars, when the king of Denmark–Norway, on the losing side, was forced to cede Norway to the king of Sweden by the Treaty of Kiel in 1814. Norwegian resistance led to the declaration of national independence and the adoption of a constitution on 17 May 1814. A brief war with Sweden resulted in the Convention of Moss on 14 August 1814 and the Norwegian constitutional revision of 4 November 1814 to open the way for a personal union. On the same day, the Norwegian parliament chose to elect Charles XIII of Sweden as King of Norway.

According to the constitution of November 1814, Norway was to have its own merchant flag, but the war flag was to reflect the union. The present flag of Norway was introduced in 1821, but its use was restricted. The union war flag of 1815 was a Swedish flag defaced with a canton showing a white saltire on red, meant to represent Norway. Public opinion in Norway saw this situation as unsatisfactory, and demanded a reform of flags and arms to reflect the equal status of the two states within the union.

== New flags of 1844 ==
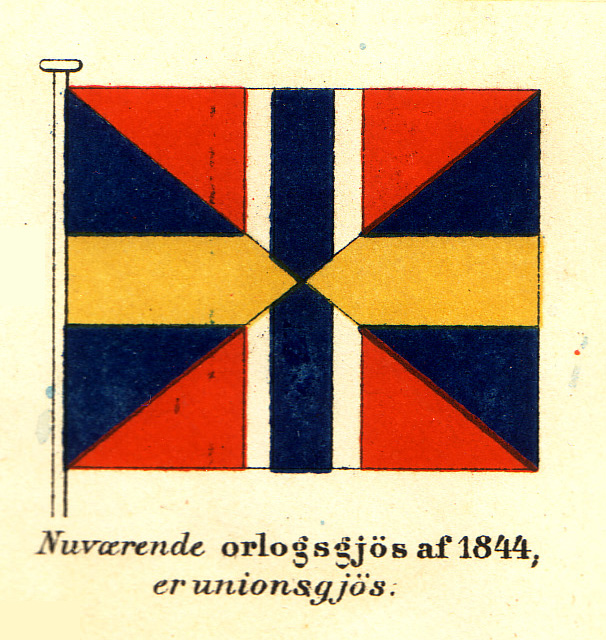
The union naval jack and diplomatic flag of Sweden and Norway 1844–1905. The proportions 4:5 were those of the union mark in Swedish flags.

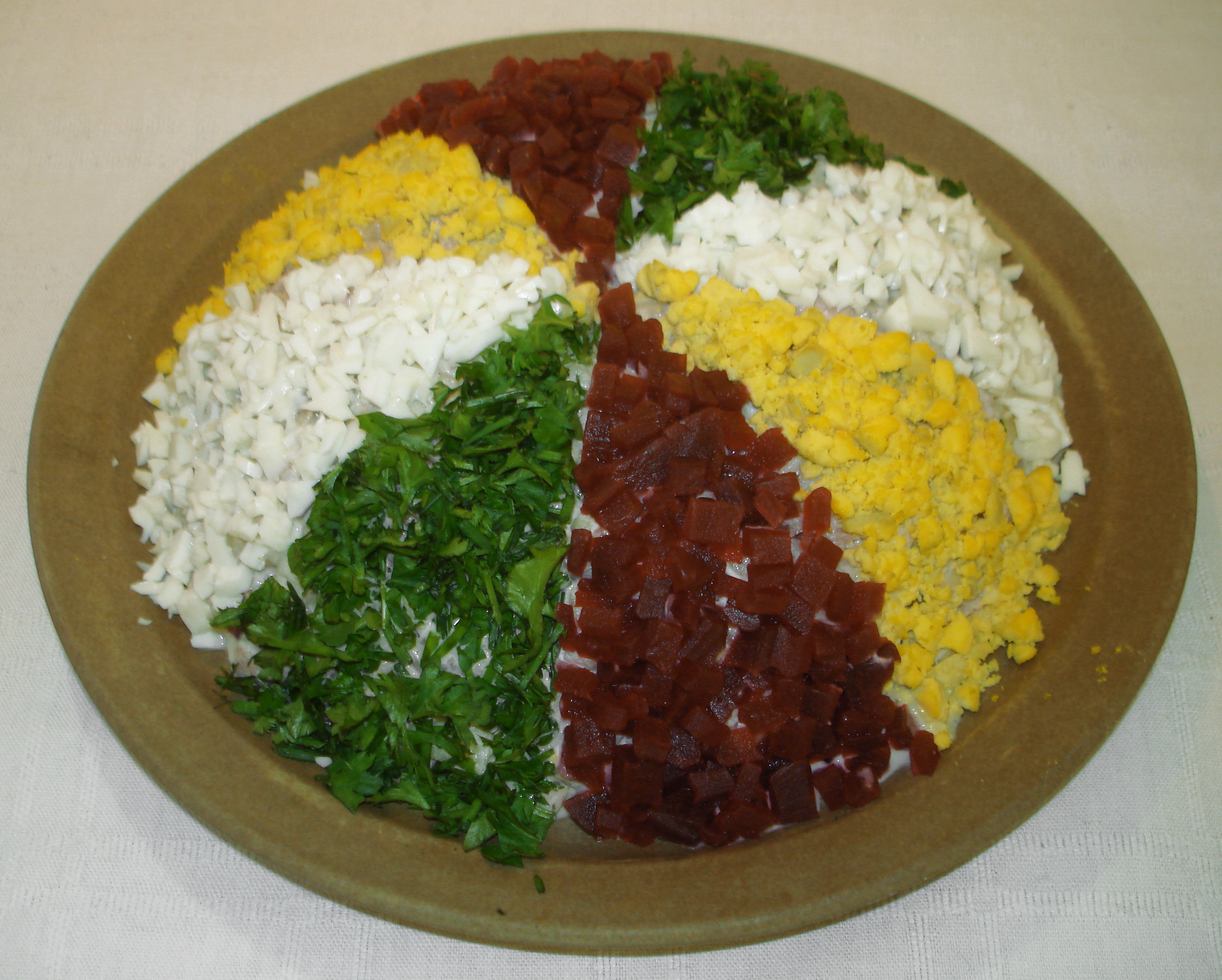
Norwegian herring salad, traditionally decorated with chopped egg yolks, egg whites, beetroots and parsley. The similarity of the decoration gave rise to the ironic nickname "the herring salad" for the union mark.

In 1844, the proposals of a joint committee were enacted for both countries by King Oscar I. A union mark was created, combining the flag colours of both countries, equally distributed. It was placed in the canton of each flag, including the merchant flags, which had until then been without any symbols of the union. The two countries received separate, but parallel flag systems, clearly manifesting their equality.

The union mark on its own was used as the naval jack in both countries, and as the flag of the common diplomatic representations of both countries abroad. The diplomatic flag had the proportions 4:5 of the union mark as it appeared in Swedish flags, unlike the square shape of the Norwegian version. It was also used on the pilot jack which was similar to the naval jack but had a white border.

The blue in the union mark would be the same as in the rest of the flag, usually the dark blue of the Norwegian flag. Swedish flags before 1905 also had a darker shade of blue than present flags.

The union mark was at first popular in Norway as a sign of Norway's equal status in the union. In Sweden, it was always seen by some people as a desecration of their flag, and one of its adversaries called it "the herring salad" (Norwegian: sildesalaten, Swedish: sillsalladen) because of its resemblance to a popular dish on the Scandinavian smörgåsbord. It came to be popularly known under this name in both countries and to this day is its common denomination in these languages.

== Abolition ==
During the 1870s, the union became increasingly unpopular in Norway, and as a consequence the union mark was seen as a sign not of equality, but of a union forced upon the country against its will. Radicals made it their political goal to reintroduce the "pure" Norwegian flag as the first step toward the dissolution of the union. The parliamentary majority voted for the removal of the mark three times, but was defeated by royal veto twice. Finally, in 1898, the third royal veto was overruled and the union mark was removed from the national (merchant) and the state flag. It remained in the war flag (naval ensign), as this was under the jurisdiction of the king. However, parliament introduced a new state flag for government buildings, similar to the war flag, but without the union mark. The "pure" Norwegian flag was hoisted again in 1899. After Norway's unilateral withdrawal from the union on 7 June 1905, the union mark disappeared from the naval ensign as well on 9 June. It remained in all Swedish flags until Sweden formally recognized the dissolution of the union. By a royal decree of 27 October, the union mark in the merchant flag and the naval ensign was to be replaced with a blue field on 1 November 1905.

== Gallery ==
=== Norway ===
Flag of Norway 1844–1898/99

War flag, Royal flag and ensign 1844–1905, state flag 1844–1899 of Norway

=== Sweden ===
Flag of Sweden 1844–1905

State flag, war flag, Royal flag and ensign of Sweden 1844–1905

=== Unused 1836 proposal ===
Proposed union mark design by Jonas Anton Hielm.

Swedish flag with proposed design

Norwegian flag with proposed design

== See also ==
- Nordic cross flag
- Union Jack

== Literature ==
- Heimer, Zeljko; Engene, Jan Oskar (2005). "Unionstidens norske flagg – Norwegian Flags of the Union Period". In: Nordisk Flaggkontakt No. 40, pp. 33–49. ISSN 0109-7539
