= Wedding of Haakon, Crown Prince of Norway, and Mette-Marit Tjessem Høiby =

2001 Norwegian royal wedding

- Haakon and Mette-Marit on their wedding day
- Date: 25 August 2001
- Location: Oslo Cathedral, Oslo, Norway
- Participants: Haakon, Crown Prince of Norway; Mette-Marit Tjessem Høiby

The wedding of Haakon, Crown Prince of Norway and Mette-Marit Tjessem Høiby took place on 25 August 2001 at Oslo Cathedral. It was the first royal wedding to take place in Norway since the marriage of then-Crown Prince Harald to Sonja Haraldsen in 1968. Because of the background of the bride, the wedding was frequently referred to in publications as "unconventional" and "uncommon". Mette-Marit was described as a modern-day Cinderella.

== Courtship and engagement ==
Crown Prince Haakon met Mette-Marit Tjessem Høiby through mutual friends in 1999. Their engagement was announced in December 2000. The relationship was not without controversy, as she was a former waitress with a four-year-old son from a previous relationship with a man with a drug conviction. After rumors abounded that Mette-Marit had a "well-known past in Oslo's dance-and-drugs house-party scene," she also admitted to previous drug abuse and a history of heavy partying.

The couple's eight-month-long engagement included a period of cohabitation in an Oslo apartment, which was disapproved of by the conservative Church of Norway. According to The New York Times, support for the monarchy as an institution hit a record low during this period, though 60 percent still considered themselves monarchists. Though surveys reported that most Norwegians did not mind the couple had lived together or that she was a single mother, the royal family did lose popularity as the details emerged about her drug involvement.

The prince's father, Harald V of Norway, was supportive of his son's decision, as he had spent nearly a decade trying to persuade his own father to allow him to marry commoner Sonja Haraldsen. There were rumors in the Norwegian press that various conservative sources were trying to pressure Haakon to consider giving up his claim to the throne, much like Edward VIII of the United Kingdom did with Wallis Simpson. Three days before the wedding, Haakon held a news conference in which he thanked his family and his country for not making their relationship a succession issue. A week before the wedding, Mette-Marit spoke out against drug use in a press conference. An opinion poll afterwards indicated a swing in public support, with 40 percent stating they had a better opinion of her and 84 percent believing she was honest about her past.

== Wedding ==
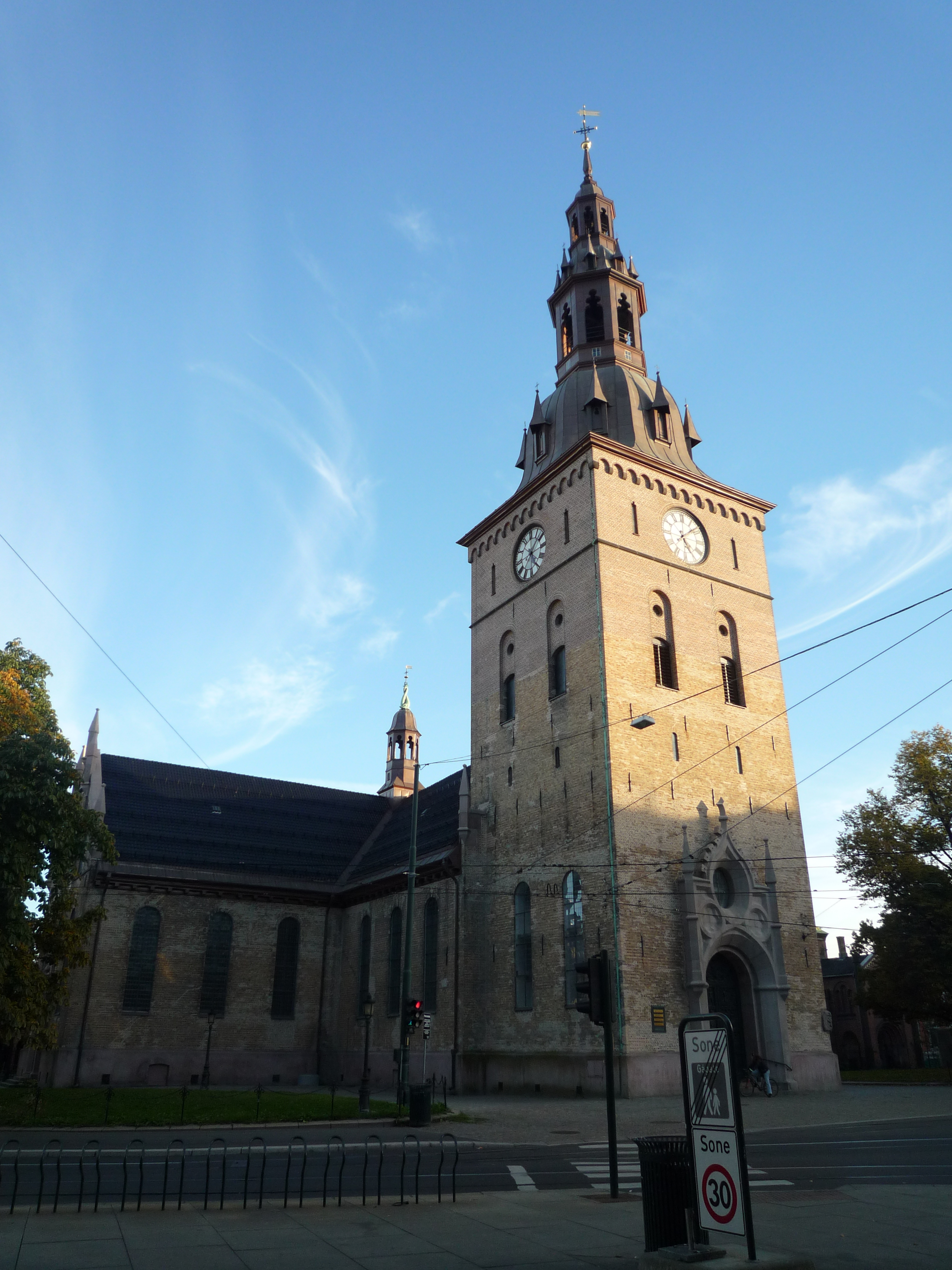
Oslo Cathedral, the site of the wedding ceremony

Haakon and Mette-Marit married on 25 August 2001 at Oslo Cathedral. The ceremony lasted one hour, and the bride wept throughout it. Mette-Marit wore a dress of white silk crepe with a 20-foot long veil, while Haakon wore a black army uniform with a red sash and medals.

In a break from tradition, the groom waited outside the door of the church, as Mette-Marit wanted to walk down the aisle alongside Haakon instead of on her father's arm. Oslo Bishop Gunnar Stålsett told the couple, "You have not chosen the easiest path, but love has triumphed," bringing tears to Mette-Marit's eyes.

Marius Høiby, the son of Mette-Marit, served as a page boy during the ceremony, while Frederik, Crown Prince of Denmark, later King Frederik X, served as Haakon's best man. Betina and Emilie Swanstrøm, Kamilla and Anniken Bjørnøy, and Tuva Høiby served as Mette-Marit's bridesmaids.

The ceremony featured music from Norwegian jazz musician Jan Garbarek, as well as text readings from Haakon's sister Princess Märtha Louise of Norway and Crown Princess Victoria of Sweden.

Upon their marriage, Mette-Marit became known as Her Royal Highness Crown Princess Mette-Marit. After the ceremony, the couple appeared with Mette-Marit's son Marius on the balcony of the royal palace in the midst of cannons firing and bands playing.

== Notable guests ==
Four kings, five queens and six heirs presumptive were in attendance. Other notable attendees include:

=== Relatives of the groom ===
- The King and Queen of Norway, the groom's parents
  - Princess Märtha Louise of Norway, the groom's sister
- Princess Ragnhild, Mrs. Lorentzen and Erling Lorentzen, the groom's paternal aunt and uncle
- Princess Astrid, Mrs. Ferner and Johan Ferner, the groom's paternal aunt and uncle

==== Haraldsen family ====
- Mr Haakon and Mrs Lis Haraldsen, the groom's maternal uncle and aunt
  - Mr Karl Otto Haraldsen and Mrs Jasmin Haraldsen, the groom's maternal first cousin and his wife
  - Miss Marianne Haraldsen, the groom's maternal first cousin
  - Mrs Lis Dagny Haraldsen Magnus, the groom's maternal first cousin

=== Relatives of the bride ===
- Mr Sven Høiby and Miss Marit Tjessem, the bride's parents
  - Marius Borg Høiby, the bride's son (page boy)

=== Foreign royalty ===
- The Queen of Denmark
  - The Crown Prince of Denmark (Haakon's best man)
  - Prince Joachim and Princess Alexandra of Denmark
- Princess Benedikte of Denmark and the Prince of Sayn-Wittgenstein-Berleburg
  - (Denmark) The Hereditary Prince of Sayn-Wittgenstein-Berleburg
  - (Denmark) Princess Alexandra of Sayn-Wittgenstein-Berleburg and Count Jefferson von Pfeil und Klein-Ellguth
  - (Denmark) Princess Nathalie of Sayn-Wittgenstein-Berleburg
- (Denmark) Count Flemming and Countess Ruth of Rosenborg, the groom's first cousin once removed and his wife
- The King and Queen of Sweden
  - The Crown Princess of Sweden
  - (Sweden) Prince Carl Philip, Duke of Värmland
  - (Sweden) Princess Madeleine, Duchess of Hälsingland and Gästrikland
- (Sweden) Prince Carl and Princess Kristine Bernadotte, the groom's granduncle and grandaunt
- The Queen of Spain (representing the King of Spain)
  - (Spain) The Prince of Asturias
- (Belgium) The King and Queen of the Belgians
  - (Belgium) The Duke of Brabant
- Grand Duke Jean and Grand Duchess Joséphine-Charlotte of Luxembourg
  - The Grand Duke and Grand Duchess of Luxembourg
    - The Hereditary Grand Duke of Luxembourg
  - Prince Guillaume and Princess Sibilla of Luxembourg
- King Constantine II and Queen Anne-Marie of the Hellenes
  - Princess Alexia of Greece and Denmark, Mrs. Morales and Carlos Morales
  - Prince Nikolaos of Greece and Denmark
- The Prince of Wales (representing the Queen of the United Kingdom and the other Commonwealth realms)
- (United Kingdom) The Earl and Countess of Wessex
- The Prince of Orange and his fiancée, Máxima Zorreguieta (representing the Queen of the Netherlands)
- Prince Constantijn and Princess Laurentien of the Netherlands
- The Hereditary Prince of Monaco (representing the Prince of Monaco)
