= Relationship of Mette-Marit, Crown Princess of Norway, and Jeffrey Epstein =

Norwegian royal scandal

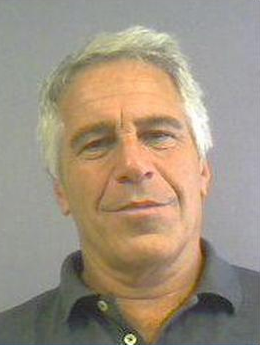
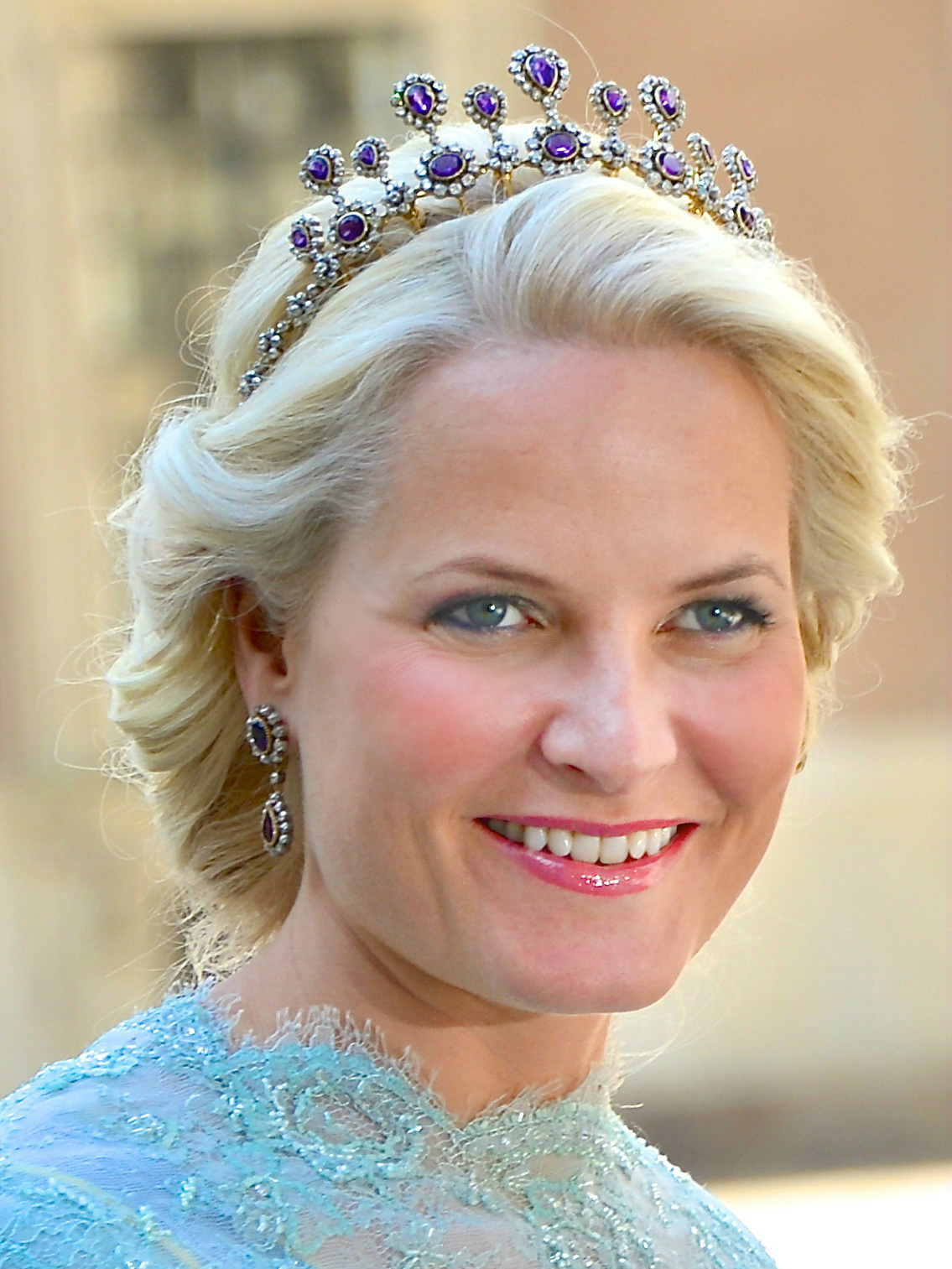
Jeffrey Epstein (left) and Crown Princess Mette-Marit of Norway (later queen) were in close contact until 2014

The relationship of Crown Princess Mette-Marit of Norway (later Queen Mette-Marit) with the American convicted sex offender Jeffrey Epstein has become a major scandal for the Norwegian royal family. The pair were introduced in 2011 and maintained close contact until 2014. Media first reported on the relationship in 2019 in the context of the indictment against Epstein in 2019. At the time Mette-Marit minimized the contact, claimed a lack of knowledge of his crimes, and claimed to have broken off contact in 2013, a claim later disproven.

In 2026, the newly released Epstein files showed extensive contact between Mette-Marit and Epstein over several years, and that she is mentioned over a thousand times in the released files. The Epstein files were released days before the trial of Mette-Marit's son Marius Borg Høiby on charges of rape. The files revealed that Mette-Marit admitted to Epstein that she had googled him and that the results "didn't look good" already in 2011, the year they first met.

In exchanges from 2012 and 2013, Mette-Marit repeatedly discussed how she was "dying of boredom" over royal duties, discussed adultery, the work of Vladimir Nabokov, and pictures of naked women she wanted to give to her then 15-year-old son Marius Borg Høiby as a wallpaper; they further discussed Epstein's "wife hunting" and dating of multiple young women, she suggested Epstein connect with Scandinavian women, asked him about "island life" and whether he enjoyed "sweetness", and they exchanged deeply intimate and personal messages about love and longing. She also wrote emotional letters to Epstein about an unnamed man, writing about how she met him and how "he made me feel like the most beautiful woman on earth." Mette-Marit and Epstein met several times, and she stayed in Epstein's later-demolished mansion in Palm Beach as late as 2013.

The case triggered debate over Mette-Marit's public role and whether she could become queen, as opinion polls and commentators argued that her position as future queen was untenable. Several organizations started processes to strip her of her patronages. Corruption expert Eva Joly said it's very hard to see how Mette-Marit would be acceptable as queen, and that "Mette-Marit has stayed in the house where two thousand girls were sexually abused." Experts stated that the scandals involving the royal family's conduct increasingly undermine its role as a representative of the Norwegian state abroad.

== Background ==
Norwegian media first reported on the relationship between Mette-Marit and Jeffrey Epstein in 2019 in the context of the relationship of then-Prince Andrew and Epstein. Epstein was convicted of procuring a person under 18 for prostitution and solicitation of prostitution. This is a sexual offense under Florida law. He was required to register as a sex offender in 2008. In 2011, Mette-Marit entered into a close friendship with Epstein and stayed in close contact until 2014, although she wrote already in 2011 that she knew of Epstein's past.

Norway has been highlighted by international media as a country with particularly extensive connections to the Epstein affair. ABC News reported that "few countries have been as roiled by the Epstein revelations as Norway." Mette-Marit, former prime minister Thorbjørn Jagland and former diplomat Terje Rød-Larsen are the three most frequently referenced Norwegians with close ties to Epstein. Both Jagland and Rød-Larsen are under investigation for corruption.

== History ==
Mette-Marit, Crown Princess of Norway (née Mette-Marit Tjessem Høiby) maintained a close friendship with the American convicted sex offender Jeffrey Epstein between 2011 and 2014. At the time she entered into a friendship with Epstein, Norwegian media had reported extensively on Epstein's conviction for child sexual abuse in 2008 and referred to him as a "convicted pedophile."

Norwegian and international media first reported on her ties to Epstein in 2019. At the time it was reported that she met him several times between 2011 and 2013, after his conviction on charges of sex trafficking of minors in 2008 and release from prison. Her friendship with Epstein was revealed by Norwegian media in the context of the scandal involving then-Prince Andrew, who in that year resigned from all public roles over his longstanding ties to Epstein and allegations of sexual abuse. Mette-Marit minimized the extent of her contact with Epstein, stating that Epstein was "responsible for his own actions." The Royal Palace's communications manager Guri Varpe asserted that she had ceased contact with Epstein in 2013, a claim that was since disproven by the release of the Epstein files.

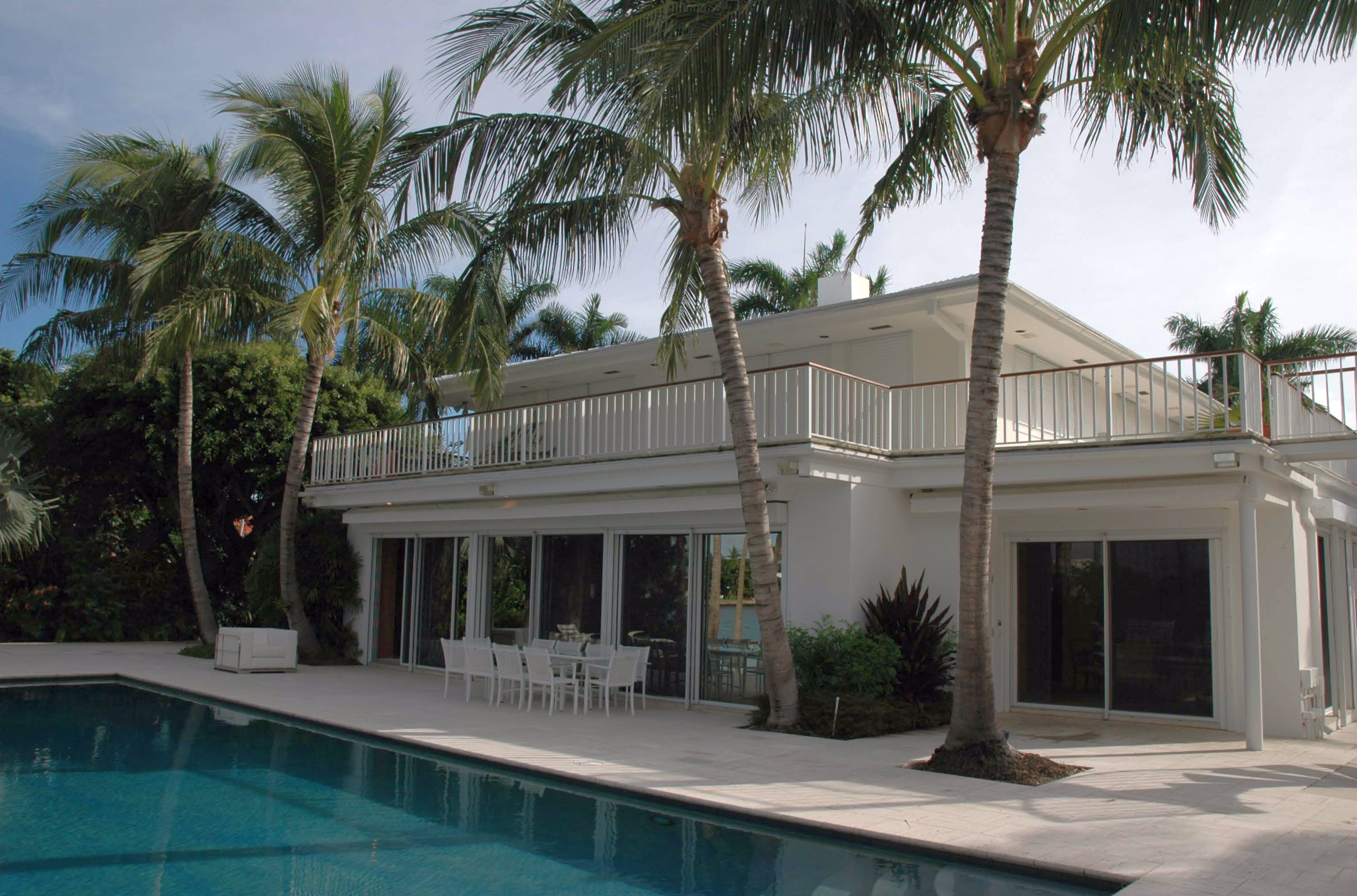
Epstein's mansion in Palm Beach, where Mette-Marit stayed for several days in 2013. The picture was taken during the police raid on the property in 2005 in connection with the investigation of Epstein for child sexual abuse. The mansion was since demolished due to its association with child sexual abuse.

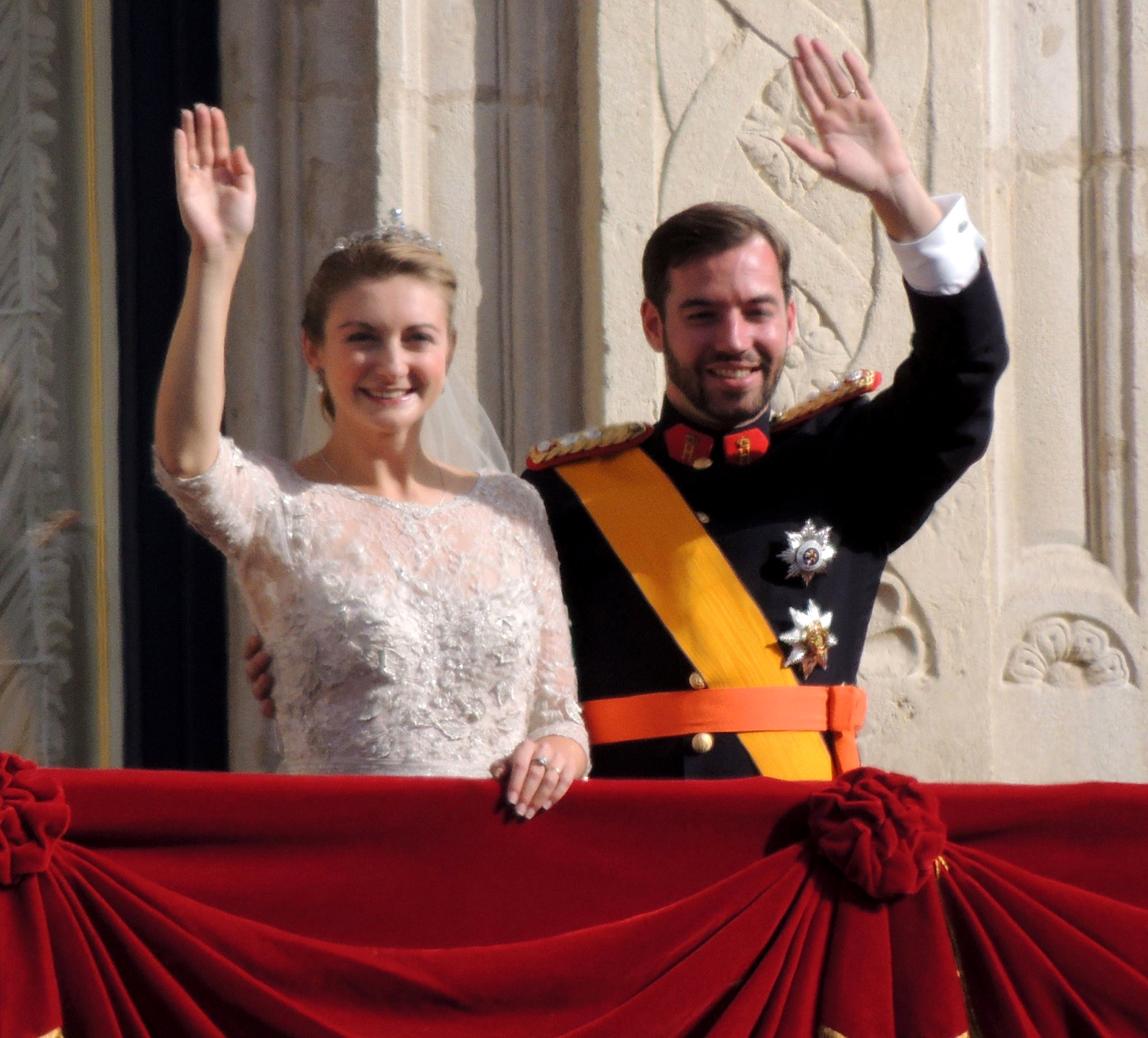
In an email to Epstein, Mette-Marit described the wedding of Guillaume, Hereditary Grand Duke of Luxembourg, and Countess Stéphanie de Lannoy as "boring".

While Mette-Marit was in frequent communication with Epstein and met him many times, her husband Crown Prince Haakon reportedly only met him once at St. Barts. In 2026, newly released Epstein files showed extensive contact between Mette-Marit and Epstein over several years, and that she is mentioned over a thousand times in the released files. The correspondence showed that Epstein sought to arrange cosmetic procedures for Mette-Marit, whom he addressed as "Mette," in Palm Beach. The files also show that Mette-Marit stayed with Epstein in his Palm Beach home for several days in 2013, while inviting each other to have dinner or go shopping together. Mette-Marit brought her personal "guru" to stay with her in the villa where Epstein sexually abused young girls. Norwegian media published a picture of Mette-Marit sitting next to half naked young woman in a bikini in Epstein's house. The Epstein files also revealed that Mette-Marit had maintained contact with Epstein as late as 2014, eight years after his conviction for child sexual abuse, despite having insisted she ceased all contact a year earlier.

Norwegian media said the Epstein files paint a totally different picture of Mette-Marit's relationship with Epstein than previous revelations or her own claims. In 2012 Mette-Marit wrote to Epstein: "You tickle my brain." In other exchanges she writes "you make me smile," "what do you have to do besides seeing me?" and asks questions like "how is island life," referring to Little Saint James where he abused young girls. In one of her emails to Epstein from 2011, Mette-Marit admitted that she had googled him and that "it didn't look good", but she continued to maintain her contact with him for another three years. She wrote in her email to Epstein in 2011: "... Googled u after last email [.] Agree it didn't look good :)". Norwegian media reported that Wikipedia, as the first Google result, at the time described him as "a convicted sex offender" convicted of "soliciting an underage girl for prostitution", who "remains under investigation by the FBI over allegations of involvement with underage girls and for money laundering."

One year after admitting she had googled him and learned about his past, Mette-Marit suggested Epstein connect with Scandinavian women and writing "Paris is good for infidelity. Scandinavians make better wife material." They discussed Epstein being with two young Norwegian women nearly forty years his junior at the time. In another exchange, Mette-Marit wrote to Epstein: "come and save us. I die of boredom" while she is representing the royal family. She referred to Epstein as "such a sweetheart." On another occasion, Mette-Marit asked Epstein about pictures of "naked women" she wanted to suggest as wallpaper to her then 15-year-old son, Marius Borg Høiby. Mette-Marit and Epstein also discussed the work of Vladimir Nabokov, the author of Lolita, with Mette-Marit asking Epstein: "Did u enjoy sweetness?" Even as the conversations between Epstein and Mette-Marit had a flirtatious and intimate tone, Epstein made disparaging statements about her behind her back to other people. In one e-mail Epstein wrote to his associate Boris Nikolić that "Mette is a mess", to which Nikolić replied by asking what had happened to Mette and if she wanted to carry Epstein's child.

In 2015 Mette-Marit, Haakon, Marius Borg Høiby, Ingrid Alexandra and Sverre Magnus went on a week-long free vacation on a yacht owned by a close associate of Epstein, Terry Taylor, who appears several times in the Epstein files. Despite criticism at the time, she refused to answer questions and said she preferred to focus on her own family. The files revealed that Epstein had taken photographs of Mette-Marit. A former assistant of Epstein told Aftenposten that the purpose of the pictures was to lure new victims by showing how he associated with famous people. In a statement to broadcaster NRK, Mette-Marit said: "I deeply regret that, and this is a responsibility I must take. I showed poor judgment and regret having any contact with Epstein at all. It is simply embarrassing." However she refused to explain what she knew about Epstein in 2011 after she had googled him and told him it didn't look good, her spokesperson stating "we have nothing further to add."

Norwegian newspaper Aftenposten noted that the British royal house had taken steps against Prince Andrew, and asked if the Norwegian royal court had taken any kind of steps since becoming aware of Mette-Marit's ties to Epstein. Guri Varpe, the royal court's communications manager, insisted "we have nothing further to add." On the same day that the deadline set by the U.S. Congress for the release of the Epstein files expired, Mette-Marit stated that her lung illness had worsened and that she was being "prepared" for a possible future transplant, although she was not put on the transplantation list at the time. The Royal Court declined to answer questions about the timing of the announcement. On 5 February, Norwegian media reported that Mette-Marit had lied about the circumstances of her meeting with Jeffrey Epstein in Saint Barthélemy. An official statement had said the encounter was a chance meeting on the street, but media outlets cited communications showing it had been planned in advance. They further suggested that Mette-Marit had knowingly misled her staff, including her spokesperson, Guri Varpe, who had repeated the false account.

== Reactions ==
Royal historian Trond Norén Isaksen said that Mette-Marit had lent Epstein royal legitimacy. The 2026 Epstein files were released days before the trial of Mette-Marit's son Marius Borg Høiby on charges of rape, compounding the scandal for the royal family. Norway's prime minister Jonas Gahr Støre said he shares the view that Mette-Marit has demonstrated a lack of judgement. Støre later said he expects Mette-Marit to fully disclose the extent of her relationship with Epstein.

Norwegian media and commentators, including Kjetil B. Alstadheim, the political editor of Norway's largest newspaper, Aftenposten, and sociologist Trond Blindheim, questioned if Mette-Marit can be part of the royal house and become queen. Additional public figures, including politician Simen Bondevik, voiced the view that Mette-Marit is not suited to be queen of Norway. Royal commentator Tove Taalesen said it has become impossible for Mette-Marit to be queen, and suggested that a solution may be for Mette-Marit to lose her official title and withdraw from public life, similarly to former prince Andrew, and become the private citizen Mette-Marit Tjessem Høiby, even if her husband continues as crown prince or king.

Corruption expert Eva Joly said it's very hard to see how Mette-Marit would be acceptable as queen, and that "Mette-Marit has stayed in the house where two thousand girls were sexually abused."

After Mette-Marit refused to explain what she knew about Epstein in 2011, Kjetil Alstadheim, the political editor of Aftenposten, said Mette-Marit and the Palace had been evasive in 2019 when the scandal originally broke and that they continue to be evasive in 2026. Swedish royal commentator Johan T. Lindwall said Mette-Marit has deliberately lied about her relationship with Epstein, and also described her repeated statements about how her royal duties and other people's weddings bored her as undignified. Lindwall described the Mette-Marit affair as the biggest royal scandal in modern history, and bigger than Prince Andrew's scandal.

Several large organizations, like Norwegian Red Cross and Norwegian Guide and Scout Association had internal meetings discussing the relation to Mette-Marit as honorary position as patron, saying they would monitor the situation. On 2 February Mette-Marit was removed as patron for the prize "Skamløsprisen" by the organization Sex and Society, a foundation working for sexual and reproductive health and rights, which said that "Sex and Society no longer wishes Mette-Marit to serve as patron." Liberal politician, and former royal staff, Carl-Erik Grimstad argues that the Royal Court had a clear duty to monitor and advise on Mette-Marit's relationships, stating that "alarm bells should have rung many years earlier" and that the handling by the Royal Court so far has the headline: "Failure of trust". Danish Royal historian Lars Hovbakke Sørensen describes the case as the most severe crisis in the history of the Norwegian monarchy, warning that the limited openness shown so far is insufficient to maintain public confidence in the institution.

On 2 February, a poll with 834 responders, found that only about a quarter (28.9%) of the responders supports Mette-Marit as a future queen, while half of the responders believes (47.6%) she should not be queen; another quarter (23.5%) had no opinion. Mette-Marit is particularly unpopular among young adults, who overwhelmingly believe she is unsuited to represent Norway. The leader of the Young Liberals, who want to replace the monarchy, said the royal family appears like a madhouse, that Mette-Marit is not a worthy representative of Norway, that she has deliberately maintained a close relationship with a child sexual abuser and that she needs to resign from public roles and titles; he also said he believes the Storting should abolish the monarchy. On 7 February the local branch of the Norwegian Labour Party in Stavanger adopted the position that "the monarchy runs counter to democratic principles of equality and popular sovereignty" and that Norway should "abolish the monarchy and introduce a republican form of government."

The Norwegian parliament, the Storting, voted on a proposal to abolish the monarchy on 3 February, a proposal advanced in the former legislative session by members of parliament representing the Liberal Party, the Conservative Party, the Progress Party, the Socialist Left Party, the Labour Party, the Red Party and the Greens. Une Bastholm of the Greens said that "a system with a president would be healthy because a president can step down." When the vote was taken, however, 141 of parliament's 169 members voted against the proposal. In response to the discussion on whether Mette-Marit can serve as queen, legal scholar Eivind Smith said it is possible for Haakon to become king without Mette-Marit becoming queen or holding any public title, even if they remain married, as titles are decided by the king. He compared it to a previous, although later reversed, decision in the United Kingdom that Camilla Parker Bowles would not become queen due to a lack of public support on the occasion of her marriage to Charles, Prince of Wales.

On 5 February Mette-Marit's daughter Ingrid Alexandra published a statement on her Instagram account, later reported by Norwegian media, in which she dismissed the criticism directed at her mother over her ties to Epstein as not constituting a real issue. She stated that the matter was not about her mother, Mette-Marit, nor about her half-brother Marius Borg Høiby, but instead described the situation as personal attacks against her family. Great Britain expert Erik Mustad responded that while the family is under considerable pressure, much of the situation has been caused by the actions of her mother and her half-brother. Royal commentator Ole Jørgen Schulsrud-Hansen called her comments inappropriate and accused her of behaving like an influencer.

=== Norway's international reputation ===
International media have extensively covered scandals involving the Norwegian royal family, linking the Norwegian monarchy to Jeffrey Epstein, rape allegations, and controversy. Experts stated that this sustained international portrayal has damaged Norway's international standing, as the royal family's conduct increasingly undermines its role as a representative of the Norwegian state abroad.

=== Statements by the royal family ===
Haakon, Crown Prince of Norway said that "I'm concerned that we prioritize things in the right order. For me, the most important thing has been to take care of my flock", mentioning Mette-Marit and Marius Borg Høiby by name and stating that "we support Marius in the situation that he is in." King Harald V refused to answer questions about the affair. The royal palace published a written statement on Mette-Marit's behalf in which she issued a "profound apology" for her actions and apologised "for the situation in which I have placed the Royal House, especially the King and Queen." The statement quoted her as saying that "some of the content in the messages between Epstein and me does not represent the person I want to be."

On 10 February Aftenposten reported that, eleven days after the release of the Epstein files, the royal palace continued to decline answering detailed questions about what Mette-Marit knew when she researched Epstein in 2011, why contact continued despite his conviction, her stay at his Palm Beach residence, possible gifts or financial benefits, discrepancies in earlier palace statements, and whether she was aware of photographs of her found among Epstein's possessions; the palace responded uniformly to enquiries by the media that it had "nothing further to add," without explaining the continued lack of clarification. Two weeks later Aftenposten reported that the royal palace again refused to answer any detailed questions about the case. Royal expert Tove Taalesen described the continued silence as a reputational catastrophe for the royal family, and suggested that the royal palace is using a delaying tactic in the hope the storm will pass. The leader of Young Labour Gaute Skjervø said that Mette-Marit and the royal family have been making excuses for far too long and demanded full transparency about Mette-Marit's ties to Epstein.

A month after the scandal broke, Mette-Marit and the royal palace still refused to answer questions. Royal commentator Tove Taalesen called it unacceptable and said it looked like contempt for the public and a "farce". Taalesen also said that other Norwegians who had ties to Epstein have already faced repercussions, including resignations and criminal prosecutions.

=== Public hearing and Commission of Inquiry ===
On 10 February the Standing Committee on Scrutiny and Constitutional Affairs of the Storting voted to establish an independent Commission of Inquiry into Jeffrey Epstein's connections to Norwegian citizens. Additionally, the committee voted to hold public hearings on Epstein's connections to Norwegian citizens, in light of the revelations from the Epstein files involving Mette-Marit, Thorbjørn Jagland, Terje Rød-Larsen and Mona Juul. Days before, the chair of the Standing Committee on Scrutiny and Constitutional Affairs, Per-Willy Amundsen, said in a speech in the Storting that "the Crown Princess may have deceived the Norwegian people."

=== March 2026 interview ===
In January 2026, Mette-Marit stated that she would later provide greater detail about her relationship with Epstein.

On 19 March 2026, Mette-Marit and her husband did an interview together, that was published the next day, where Mette-Marit addressed her relationship with Epstein. In the interview Mette-Marit claimed she was "deceived and manipulated" by Epstein and regretted meeting him, but also tried to avoid blame from aiding his actions, stating "it is important for me to clarify that there is no blame on me in this situation. It is all the victims who have been subjected to the gross abuses who deserve justice." The interview was considered to be controversial and left many questions unanswered in regard to her friendship with Epstein.

In response to the interview, Tove Taalesen, an expert regarding the royal family of Norway, stated that Mette-Marit should not become queen and that [the interview was a chance to give okay answers, or] "she had one chance, and she did not [use it or] take it". Taalesen continued saying that "the public can not let bad health become an excuse for bad judgement", and "even though she is likely to become queen some day, we are no longer discussing what kind of queen, but if" she should become a queen at all.

Some of the questions were sent in advance to the interviewees; some other questions were follow-ups; the broadcasting company, NRK, was free to ask any questions, during the alloted 20 minutes.

=== Collaboration ties severed ===
On 28 April 2026, The Amandus Festival became another foundation to sever collaboration ties with Mette-Marit in response to revelations about her ties to Jeffrey Epstein. Other foundations to sever collaboration with her include Sex and Society, Fokus, the Norwegian Library Association, and the Mental Health Council.

== Timeline ==
| Date | Event | Ref. |
|---|---|---|
| 2005 | Police in Palm Beach, Florida start investigating Jeffrey Epstein on suspicion of child sexual abuse, searching his mansion in Palm Beach. | |
| 2008 | Jeffrey Epstein is convicted of child sexual abuse | |
| 2010 | Then-Prince Andrew, Duke of York claims to have broken off his contact with Epstein in that year | |
| 2011 | Virginia Giuffre went public with further allegations against Epstein, triggering significant media coverage | |
| 2011 | Norwegian media widely report on Epstein's child sexual abuse and describe him as a pedophile | |
| 2011–2014 | Mette-Marit, Crown Princess of Norway, maintains a close friendship with Epstein | |
| 2011 | Mette-Marit writes to Epstein that she had googled him and that "it didn't look good :)" | |
| 2013 | Mette-Marit stays in Jeffrey Epstein's Palm Beach mansion | |
| 2019 | Media report on Mette-Marit's ties to Epstein in the context of the scandal over then-Prince Andrew's ties to Epstein. In a public statement Mette-Marit minimizes the extent of her relationship with Epstein, claims a lack of knowledge of Epstein's crimes and claims they broke off contact in 2013 | |
| 2019 | Jeffrey Epstein dies by suicide in his jail cell in the Metropolitan Correctional Center, New York | |
| 2021 | Jeffrey Epstein's Palm Beach mansion is demolished due to its association with child sexual abuse | |
| 31 January 2026 | The Epstein files show extensive contact between Mette-Marit and Epstein between 2011 and 2014, that she is mentioned over a thousand times in the material and that she admitted to Epstein in 2011 that she had researched his past and that it "didn't look good" | |
| 1 February 2026 | Mette-Marit's spokesperson says "we have nothing further to add" | |
| 2 February 2026 | Prime Minister Jonas Gahr Støre says he expects Mette-Marit to fully disclose the extent of her relationship with Epstein | |
| 2 February 2026 | Norwegian police opens an open-ended investigation into the Epstein files to assess whether any Norwegian citizens may have committed criminal offences linked to Epstein, and shortly thereafter starts investigating Thorbjørn Jagland and Terje Rød-Larsen for gross corruption over their ties to Epstein | |
| 4 February 2026 | Several organisations under the patronage of Mette-Marit question their cooperation and request clarification from the Royal Palace. | |
| 5 February 2026 | In an Instagram statement, Ingrid Alexandra wrote, "Media, please stop blaming us." | |
| 6 February 2026 | In a written statement published by the royal palace, Mette-Marit issued a "profound apology" for her actions. The Royal Secretariat writes a letter to organisations under Mette-Marit's patronage acknowledging concerns over the Epstein case. | |
| 9 February 2026 | The Norwegian Council for Mental Health puts its cooperation with Mette-Marit on hold. | |
| 13 February 2026 | The Norwegian Library Association suspends Mette-Marit's patronage pending further clarification regarding her contact with Jeffrey Epstein. | |

== Communications sent by Mette-Marit to Epstein ==
Communications sent by Mette-Marit to Epstein that have been widely reported on by media include:

| Date | Text | Notes | Ref. |
|---|---|---|---|
| 23-10-2011 | Ha ha god you work fast! I love it But then again im not overly focused on details. I'm more the emotional picture kind of gal Try read with your gut not your intellect Might get better Googled u after last email Agree didn't look too good : ) Thanks for the video Such a beautiful woman If one could only hope to become like that at old age See u later Mm | Mette-Marit confirms she knew about Epstein's past since 2011, the year they met | |
| 25-10-2011 | Did u enjoy sweetness? | In response to conversations about the work of Vladimir Nabokov, the author of Lolita | |
| 12-11-2012 | You r such a sweetheart | | |
| 13-11-2012 | Is it inappropriate for a mother to suggest two naked women carrying a surfboard for my 15 yr old sons wallpaper ? | Discussing her 15-year-old son Marius Borg Høiby | |
| 2012 | You tickle my brain | | |
| 2012 | You make me smile | | |
| 2012 | How is island life? | Referring to Epstein's island | |
| 2012 | What do you have to do besides seeing me? | | |
| 2012 | And I'm still trying to get over the shock that you are in fact wife hunting. | In response to messages from Epstein that "I am on my wife hunt" and mentioning young women he is with | |
| 2012 | Freezing Snow yesterday Paris good for adultery Scandis better wife material But then again Who am Ito talk ? | In response to messages from Epstein that "I am on my wife hunt" and mentioning young women he is with | |
| 2012 | @boringparty Come save us. Im dying of boredom | Discussing the wedding of Guillaume, Hereditary Grand Duke of Luxembourg, and Countess Stéphanie de Lannoy | |
| 2012 | Boring wedding Was like some kind of old movie Where you know the characters are not hanging around for much long | Discussing the wedding of Guillaume, Hereditary Grand Duke of Luxembourg, and Countess Stéphanie de Lannoy | |
| 2012 | Jeffrey It has taken me some time to respond Because I was in some way so overwhelmed by emotion from your email I know it is silly to smoke It pulls me not only physically towards darkness Isn't it so telling that that I started smoking again exactly when I met him I appreciate the tenderness in your email So I followed up. The smoking course is booked for the week I get back I haven't gotten the trainer in place yet but will do research in Miami so I will be ready to start when I get back [...] Jeffrey he made me feel like the most beautiful woman on earth I know I will have to find that somewhere else And I know the only answer is within Thank you for seeing me Mm | | |
| 2013 | Anyway are you coming over to see me soon??? I miss my crazy friend | | |
| 2013 | I will make a huge effort to see you as I want you to meet Haakon my husband | | |
| 2013 | Treat the island well | Referring to Epstein's island | |

== See also ==
- List of people named in the Epstein files
