= Rytter =

Rytter is a surname. Notable people with the surname include:

- Henrik Rytter (1877–1950), Norwegian dramatist, lyricist and translator
- Jan Rytter (born 1973), Danish archer
- Olav Rytter (1903–1992), Norwegian newspaper editor, radio personality, foreign correspondent, philologist and translator
- Thomas Rytter (born 1974), Danish footballer and manager
- Wojciech Rytter, Polish computer scientist
