= Sven O. Høiby =

Father of Queen Mette-Marit of Norway and convicted felon (1936–2007)

Sven Høiby
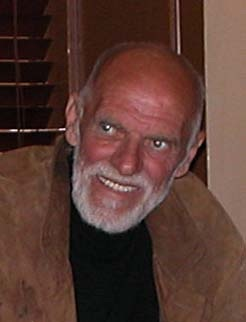
- Høiby in 2002
- Born: Sven Olaf Bjarte Høiby; 14 November 1936
- Died: 21 March 2007 (aged 70)
- Occupation: Journalist
- Spouse(s): Marit Tjessem (divorced 1984) Renate Barsgård (m. 2005; div. 2005)
- Children: 4, including Mette-Marit, Queen of Norway
- Parent(s): Bjarne Høiby; Ingrid Andrea Tvedt

Sven Olaf Bjarte Høiby (14 November 1936 – 21 March 2007) was the father of Queen Mette-Marit of Norway. In his younger years he had briefly worked as a journalist with a local paper in his hometown of Kristiansand but was on welfare when he became known as the father of Mette-Marit; he had been convicted twice of assault. After his daughter married the Crown Prince, he became a national celebrity due to his years-long cooperation with the yellow press, especially Se og Hør, and his subsequent marriage to a stripper. He was accused of exploiting his daughter's relationship with the royal family and of selling articles about her and his grandson Marius Borg Høiby.

== Early life ==
He and Mette-Marit's mother, Marit Tjessem, divorced in 1984. After the divorce, Mette-Marit grew up with her mother, stepfather, and siblings, while visiting her father regularly on weekends. She later revealed in an interview that her father also suffered from alcoholism, which she "had to hide" from her friends. Høiby worked for several years as a journalist in a local newspaper and as a small-scale advertiser and publisher in his hometown. By the time his daughter's relationship to the Crown Prince was publicly known, he had retired from working and was receiving a disability pension.

In his younger days, he had participated in athletics. Among others, he achieved a time of 58.0 seconds in the 400 metres hurdles in 1959. He represented the club Kristiansands IF.

== Tabloids ==
Sven O. Høiby became controversial following his daughter's marriage to the Crown Prince. The national tabloids and especially the gossip magazine Se og Hør printed several stories where he gave interviews and was presented in less-than-flattering situations.

"En helt vanlig dag på jobben" ("Just another day at the office"), a book published by former Se og Hør journalist Håvard Melnæs, who knew Høiby personally, reveals that Høiby was being paid up to 400,000 Norwegian krone a year by the magazine to appear in articles, and for sharing private pictures and information about his daughter's childhood. The magazine even purchased a mobile phone for him (he couldn't afford one himself) and paid his phone bills as a bonus for his "services". In his book Melnæs reveals that as Høiby had financial problems, he could not afford to say "no" to any suggestions from Se og Hør. The magazine and other tabloids have been criticized for taking advantage of a man who seemed to have a less than sound judgment on what kind of articles to participate in.

During this period, Høiby made several outspoken comments, and he announced that he was writing a book about Mette-Marit's young son, Marius, her child from a previous relationship. The book never materialised, but the relationship between father and daughter had been strained by this, and Høiby giving information about her to the tabloids. Høiby further estranged himself from his daughter by marrying Renate Barsgård, a former stripper half his age. The couple divorced after three months. At their wedding, folk singer Sputnik was best man.

Reportedly, father and daughter had reconciled some time before his death and he was, among other events, invited to attend the baptism of his granddaughter, Princess Ingrid Alexandra, in 2004.

== Death ==
On 25 August 2006, Høiby told Se og Hør that he had been diagnosed with lung cancer. He died on 21 March 2007 at the age of 70. Høiby was buried at Kristiansand Cemetery together with his parents.
