= Ryther =

Ryther is a surname. Notable people with the surname include:

- Augustine Ryther (died 1593), English engraver and translator
- Megan Ryther (born 1979), American freestyle swimmer
- Thomas Ryther

== See also ==
- Ryther, North Yorkshire, in Ryther cum Ossendyke, England
- Rytter
