= Combat Engineer Battalion (Norway) =

Norwegian Army unit

- Ingeniørbataljonen
- Insignia of the Combat Engineer Battalion
- Active: 1987–present
- Country: Norway
- Branch: Army
- Type: Combat engineer
- Role: Construction, demolition, demining, and CBRN defense
- Size: Battalion (Note: 400 conscripts and 260 enlisted personnel.)
- Part of: Brigade Nord
- Garrison/HQ: Skjold
- Mottos: Latin: Ubique Quo fas et gloria ducunt English: Wherever justice and glory lead
- Colors: Blue

Insignia
- Standard

The Combat Engineer Battalion (Norwegian: Ingeniørbataljonen) is a combat engineering support unit of the Norwegian Army. The battalion is mostly based at Camp Camp Skjold in Troms county in Northern Norway with two additional companies stationed at Rena Military Camp in Rena, Innlandet county.

The battalion is the largest unit in the Norwegian brigade and maintains broad operational capabilities. The Combat Engineer Battalion co-operates with other units of the Norwegian Armed Forces and of NATO, providing mine clearing, bridge demolition, as well as engineering divers.

== History ==
The Combat Engineer Battalion was established as a support unit in the former brigade, called Brigaden i Nord-Norge (Brig N). In its current form, it first became a separate full-scale operational battalion in 1987, when the NBC platoon in Troms Landforsvar (TLF) and the mechanical platoon in Hålogaland Engineer Battalion were merged with the brigade's Combat Engineer Company (abbr. INGKP/N). The Combat Engineer Company was established at the same time as the Brigade Nord, in 1953.

The year before the battalion was fully established, the Combat Engineer Company participated in the NATO winter exercise, called Anchor Express. On 5 March 1986, while excavating a track through a narrow valley in Vassdalen, a major avalanche struck 31 soldiers. Sixteen soldiers were killed in the accident. The avalanche came down the 766-metre (2,513 ft) tall mountain Storebalak. The avalanche hit the valley about 5 kilometres (3.1 mi) above the lake Hartvikvatnet.

During the rescue work after the landslide in Gjerdrum in December 2020, the battalion made significant contributions by supporting with personnel and material.

Princess Ingrid Alexandra began performing her military service with the battalion on 17 January 2024, and is set to remain part of the unit until April 2025. In September 2024, the Norwegian Royal Court announced that Ingrid Alexandra was serving as a gunner on a CV-90 infantry fighting vehicle.

== Organisation ==
- Armoured Engineer Company 1
- Armoured Engineer Company 2
- Armoured Engineer Company 3
- Combat Engineer Company 4
- Combat Engineer Company 5
- Combat Engineer Company 6
- CBRN Company

Two of the companies, Armoured Engineer Company 3 and Combat Engineer Company 5, are fully professional, with enlisted crews, while Armoured Engineer Company 1 is partly enlisted.

The engineer battalion is equipped with a comprehensive fleet of equipment that includes paving and amphibious equipment, construction machinery (armoured and unarmoured) and NBC protection and cleaning equipment.
