= Ingrid Alexandra, Crown Princess of Norway =

Heir apparent to the Norwegian throne (born 2004)

Ingrid Alexandra
- Crown Princess of Norway
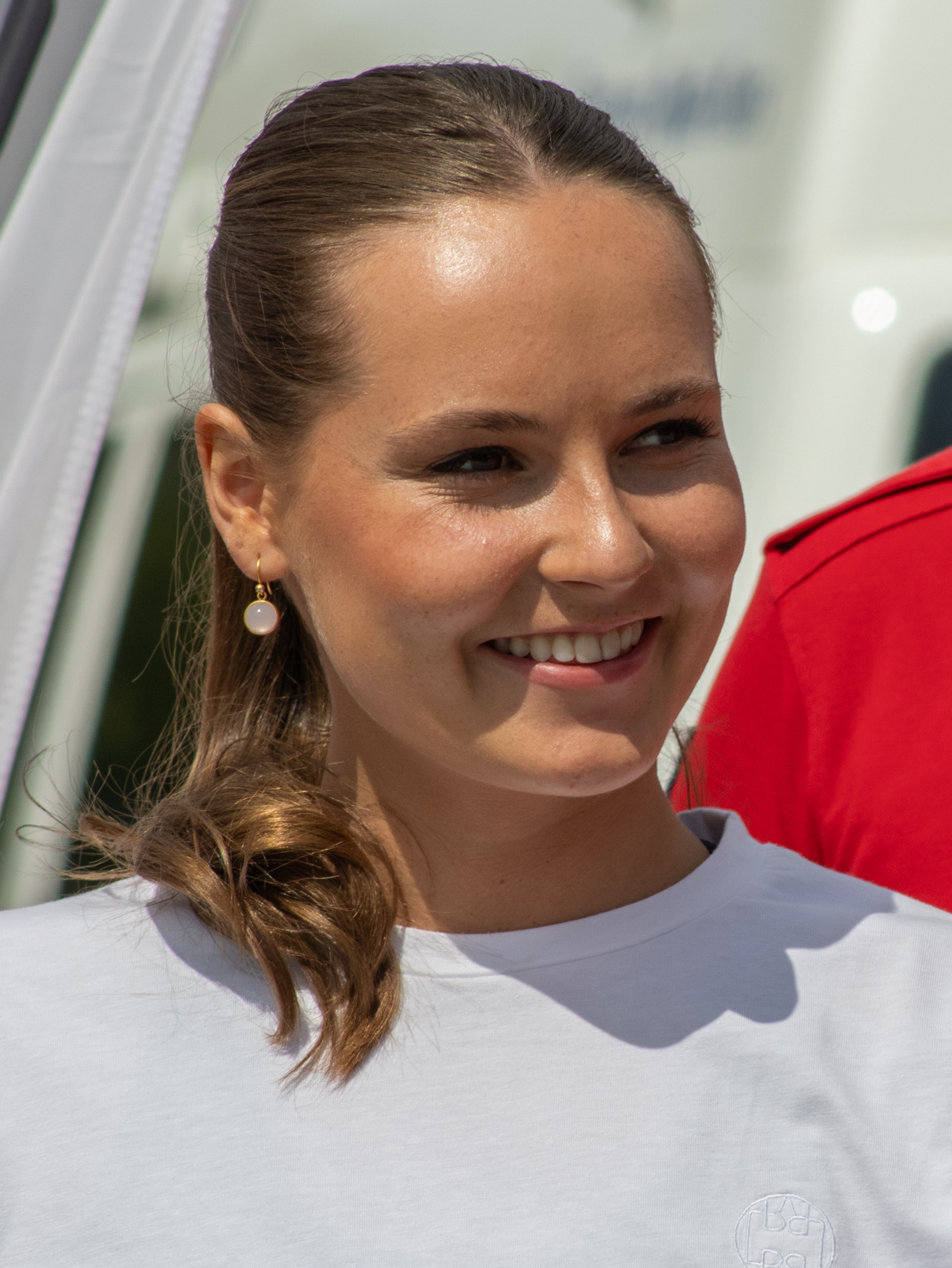
- Ingrid Alexandra in 2025
- Born: 21 January 2004 (age 22); The National Hospital, Oslo, Norway
- House: Glücksburg
- Father: Haakon VIII
- Mother: Mette-Marit Tjessem Høiby
- Religion: Church of Norway
- Education: University of Sydney University of Oslo
- Military career
- Allegiance: Norway
- Branch: Norwegian Army
- Service years: 2024–2025
- Rank: Private
- Unit: Engineer Battalion

Ingrid Alexandra, Crown Princess of Norway (Norwegian pronunciation: [ˈɪ̀ŋːrɪ a.lɛkˈsan.dra]; born 21 January 2004), is the heir apparent to the Norwegian throne. She is the elder child of King Haakon VIII and the second child of Queen Mette-Marit. She was born during the reign of her paternal grandfather, King Harald V. She became Crown Princess of Norway following her grandfather's death and her father's subsequent ascension to the Norwegian throne in August 2026.

She represents the fifth generation of the Norwegian royal family of the House of Glücksburg. She has a younger brother, Prince Sverre Magnus, whom she ranks above in the line of succession after the implementation of absolute primogeniture in 1990.

== Birth and baptism ==
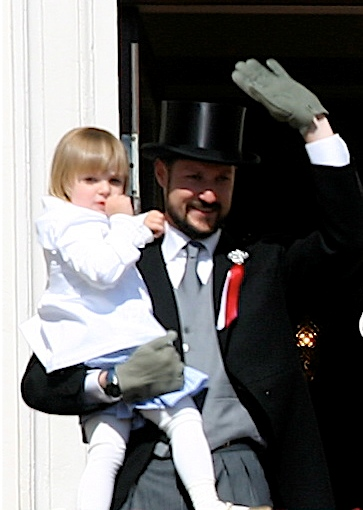
Ingrid Alexandra with her father in 2007

Ingrid Alexandra was born at 09:13 on 21 January 2004 at The National Hospital, part of the Oslo University Hospital in Oslo, the first child and only daughter of King Haakon VIII, and his wife, Queen Mette-Marit, then Crown Prince and Crown Princess. She is the granddaughter of King Harald V and Queen Sonja. She has an older half-brother, Marius Borg Høiby, born in 1997 from her mother's prior relationship, and a younger brother, Prince Sverre Magnus of Norway.

Ingrid Alexandra was baptised by Bishop Gunnar Stålsett in the chapel of the Royal Palace on 17 April 2004. Her grandfather the King, her aunt Princess Märtha Louise, King Frederik X of Denmark, the Crown Princess of Sweden, King Felipe VI of Spain, and her maternal grandmother Marit Tjessem were her godparents. The then-Crown Prince of Denmark and then-Prince of Asturias were unable to attend the christening; both were preparing for their respective weddings scheduled to occur the month following the christening.

On 31 August 2019, Ingrid Alexandra was confirmed in the Palace Chapel in Oslo with all her godparents present.

== Education and military service ==
=== School education ===
Ingrid Alexandra attended Sem Kindergarten in Asker, Akershus from April 2006 until August 2010. She started her first day of elementary school on 19 August 2010 at Jansløkka School, a local state school attended by her half-brother. Her parents chose the school because they wanted her to have as ordinary a childhood as possible. Newspaper reports said Ingrid Alexandra would walk to school with her half-brother, and local citizens could expect to see her occasionally out in the community with her classmates on school outings. School officials hoped to make the school a place where the princess could make friends and enjoy some relief from public scrutiny.

On 17 June 2014, the Norwegian royal family announced at the start of the 2014–2015 school year that Ingrid Alexandra would transfer to the private English-language Oslo International School, reportedly because her parents wanted her to be fluent in English. Ingrid Alexandra was transferred to Oslo's Uranienborg School to complete her lower secondary education. She was part of the student council at Uranienborg School. In autumn 2020, she began further schooling at Elvebakken Upper Secondary School in Oslo. She graduated in April 2023. After her graduation, Ingrid Alexandra worked as a school assistant and environmental worker at Uranienborg School.

=== Military service ===
Ingrid Alexandra started her 12 months of military service as a conscript at the Combat Engineer Battalion in Brigade Nord on 17 January 2024. She was one of 9,900 young Norwegians selected for mandatory military service in 2024. Ingrid Alexandra served in Skjold camp, Øverbygd. She used her second name, Alexandra, as a surname during her military service. She was initially trained at the recruit school for eight weeks where she received basic military education.

After the recruitment period, Ingrid Alexandra was assigned a service position, undergoing a professional period with specific education, followed by departmental training and practice. In September 2024, the Norwegian Royal Court announced that Ingrid Alexandra served as a gunner on a CV-90 infantry fighting vehicle. The Court also announced that she extended her military service to 15 months. She completed her military service on 4 April 2025.

=== Tertiary education ===
In May 2025, the Norwegian royal house announced that Ingrid Alexandra had enrolled to study for a Bachelor of Arts degree at the University of Sydney, Australia, commencing in August 2025. "She has chosen a three-year degree with a focus on international relations and political economy," the announcement continued. The princess would be living at the university's campus in Camperdown, New South Wales, close to the Sydney CBD, and would take a step back from her royal appearances while studying.

In summer 2026, it was announced Ingrid Alexandra would continue her tertiary studies as an exchange student at the University of Oslo. She transferred temporarily given her mother's health.

== Activities ==
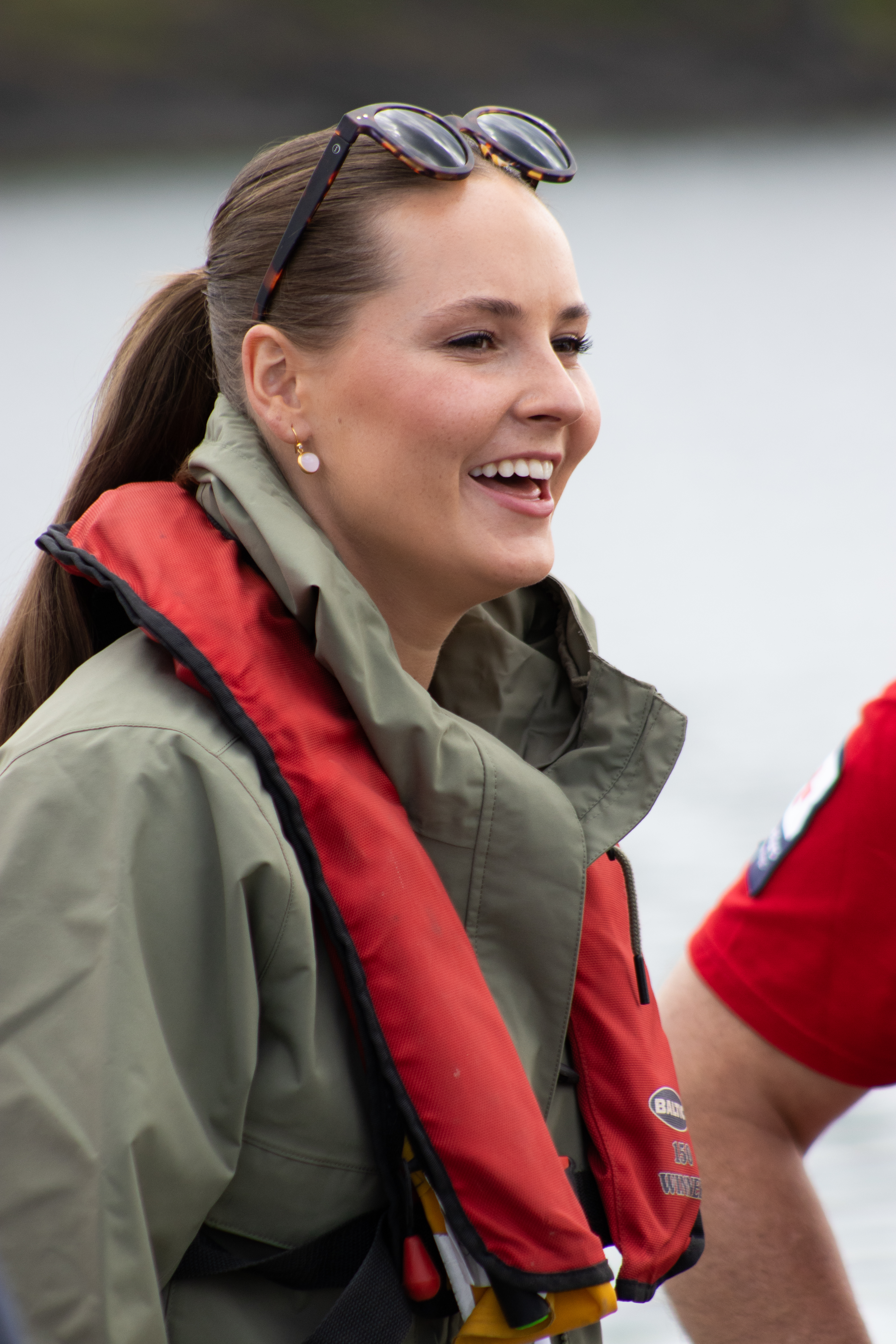
Ingrid Alexandra opening the Norwegian Red Cross Search and Rescue Corps' summer readiness at Kadettangen in Sandvika in Bærum in June 2025.

On 19 June 2010, Ingrid Alexandra served as a bridesmaid at the wedding of Crown Princess Victoria of Sweden and Daniel Westling. In December 2012, the Princess attended an interview with her father by a Norwegian television programme in aid of Environmental Agents, the children's environmental organization. Her mother was supposed to attend, but the then Crown Prince attended instead as the then Crown Princess was ill. She has taken part in traditional celebrations of the Constitution Day, as well as the traditional ski jumping tournament at Holmenkollen in Oslo.

On 4 May 2015, Ingrid Alexandra christened the Norwegian Rescue Company's new lifeboat, Elias, in her first royal assignment. Accompanied by her grandfather the King, she was made godmother of the boat. On 19 May 2016, the Princess Ingrid Alexandra Sculpture Park opened in the Palace Park, as part of the celebration of the King and Queen's 25th anniversary. It features sculptures made for children and by children. She takes active part in choosing the designs from among the contributions to the sculpture park from school children all over Norway. In 2018, she gave a guided tour of the park to the Duke and Duchess of Cambridge during their official visit to Norway.

On 12 February 2016, Ingrid Alexandra and her grandfather participated in the opening ceremony of the II Winter Youth Olympics in Lillehammer: the King, as he previously did in the 1994 Winter Olympics, declared the Games opened, while the Princess, like her father Crown Prince Haakon did 22 years before, lit the cauldron. On 17 November 2018, Princess Ingrid Alexandra christened the research vessel Kronprins Haakon, which was named after her father. The vessel was christened at its home port of Tromsø. The princess expressed interest in the ocean and climate change, which motivated her to christen the ship. She stated that the ship will bring "new and crucial knowledge about the polar areas, about the oceans and about climate change." In October 2020, Ingrid Alexandra won the gold medal in the junior women's final at Norwegian surfing championship at Jæren. The Royal Court lists her sporting interests as including kickboxing, skiing and water sports.

On 20 January 2022, Ingrid Alexandra visited the three branches of the Norwegian government: the Storting, the Supreme Court and the office of the prime minister. These visits were part of a series of activities Princess Ingrid Alexandra undertook ahead of her 18th birthday the next day. Her father, Crown Prince Haakon, did the same on his own 18th birthday in 1991. On the day of her birthday on 21 January, she attended a meeting of the Council of State alongside Crown Prince Haakon and King Harald. This was followed by a series of congratulatory deputations from Norwegian officials at the Royal Palace. The Princess received congratulations from representatives of the governmental branches as well as the Sámi Parliament, county governors, the diplomatic corps, the Norwegian Armed Forces and the Church of Norway. Cannon salutes were fired at noon to mark Ingrid Alexandra's birthday. On 16 June, the government held a dinner to mark her 18th birthday at the Oslo Public Library. On 17 June, a gala party was hosted by her grandparents, the King and Queen, at the Royal Palace. Guests from many European royal houses attended.

In October 2022, Ingrid Alexandra visited Norwegian Army's Setermoen camp in Indre Troms. In October 2023, she and her parents attended Prince Christian of Denmark's 18th birthday celebration banquet at Christiansborg Palace, Denmark. In May 2024, she wore military uniform for the first time on the Constitution Day balcony appearance.

On 8 April 2025, she took part for the first time in the official program during a state visit, in connection with the visit to Norway by Icelandic President Halla Tómasdóttir and her husband.

=== Statement on the Mette-Marit–Epstein and Høiby affairs ===
On 5 February 2026, Ingrid Alexandra published a statement on her Instagram account, later reported by Norwegian media, in which she dismissed the criticism directed at her mother over her ties to Jeffrey Epstein as not constituting a real issue. She stated that the matter was not about her mother, nor about her half-brother Marius Borg Høiby, who was on trial for rape at the time, but instead described the situation as personal attacks against her family. Royal expert Erik Mustad responded that while the family is under considerable pressure, much of the situation has been caused by the actions of her mother and her half-brother. Royal commentator Ole Jørgen Schulsrud-Hansen called her comments inappropriate and accused her of behaving like an influencer.

In June 2026, Ingrid Alexandra temporarily returned to Norway from Australia amid concerns over her mother's health; Mette‑Marit had been diagnosed with pulmonary fibrosis in 2018 and underwent a lung transplant in June 2026.

== Constitutional status ==
The Constitution of Norway was altered in 1990 to introduce absolute primogeniture, ensuring that the crown would pass to the eldest child regardless of gender but keeping then Crown Prince Haakon ahead of his elder sister, Princess Märtha Louise; the change was to apply for the first time to their children. Until her grandfather's death, Ingrid Alexandra had thus been second in the line of succession since birth, preceded only by her father. Because of the reform, her status was not affected by the subsequent birth of her brother, Prince Sverre Magnus, in 2005. Ingrid Alexandra is expected to become Norway's first female monarch since Queen Margaret, who reigned over Norway, Denmark and Sweden from the late 1380s until her death in 1412.

Along with her parents and grandmother – but unlike her younger brother Sverre Magnus, her older maternal half-brother Marius, and other relatives – Ingrid Alexandra is a member of the Norwegian Royal House. The family belongs to the House of Glücksburg.

== Personal life ==
Ingrid Alexandra was in a relationship with Magnus Heien Haugstad, a Norwegian economics student from Bærum, between 2022 and 2024.

== Titles, styles, honours and arms ==
=== Titles and styles ===
- 21 January 2004 – 28 August 2026:
  - Her Royal Highness Princess Ingrid Alexandra
  - Her Royal Highness The Princess
- 28 August 2026 – present: Her Royal Highness The Crown Princess

=== Arms ===
Coat of arms

Standard

Monogram as princess

Ingrid Alexandra's monogram was designed by Queen Margrethe II of Denmark, her grandfather's second cousin who is known for her artistic talents.

=== Military ranks ===
Norwegian Army

- 17 January 2024 – 13 March 2024: Recruit.
- 13 March 2024 – 4 April 2025: Private.

=== Honours ===
==== National honours ====
- Grand Cross of the Royal Norwegian Order of Saint Olav (21 January 2022)
- Dame of the Royal Family Decoration of King Harald V (21 January 2022)
- Recipient of the Royal House Centennial Medal (25 November 2005)
- Recipient of King Harald V's Jubilee Medal 1991-2016 (17 January 2016)
- National Service Medal (Army) (2 April 2025)
- Norwegian Reservists Association's Badge of Honour (11 December 2025)
- Brigade Veterans Association's Badge of Honour (27 March 2025)

==== Foreign honours ====
- Denmark:
  - Knight of the Order of the Elephant (21 January 2022)
- Iceland:
  - Grand Cross of the Order of the Falcon (8 April 2025)

=== Wear of orders, decorations and medals ===
Ribbon bar of Princess Ingrid Alexandra

	Grand Cross of the Royal; Norwegian Order of Saint Olav	Royal House; Centennial Medal	
King Harald V's; Jubilee Medal 1991-2016	National Service Medal (Army)	Norwegian Reserve Officers' Federation's; Badge of Honour	Brigade Veterans Association's; Badge of Honour

=== Honorific eponyms ===
==== Geographic locations ====
- Norway: Princess Ingrid Alexandra Sculpture Park, Royal Palace in Sentrum, Oslo.

Ingrid Alexandra, Crown Princess of Norway House of Glücksburg Born: 21 January 2004
Norwegian royalty
Preceded by Haakon as Crown Prince	Crown Princess of Norway; 2026–present	Incumbent
Lines of succession
First Heir apparent	Succession to the Norwegian throne 1st position	Succeeded by Prince Sverre Magnus
Olympic Games
Preceded by Chen Ruolin	Final Youth Olympic torchbearer Lillehammer 2016	Succeeded by Santiago Lange
Preceded by Chen Ruolin	Final Youth Olympic torchbearer Lillehammer 2016	Succeeded by Paula Pareto
Preceded by Egon Zimmermann	Final Winter Youth Olympic torchbearer Lillehammer 2016	Succeeded by Gina Zehnder
Preceded by Franz Klammer	Final Winter Youth Olympic torchbearer Lillehammer 2016	Succeeded by Gina Zehnder
