= Olav Rytter =

Norwegian journalist (1903–1992)

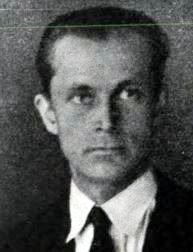
- A photo of Rytter from an academic biographical book published in 1933
- Born: 29 January 1903; Kristiansund, Norway
- Died: 7 June 1992 (aged 89)
- Education: University of Oslo; University of Prague
- Occupations: Newspaper editor, radio personality, foreign correspondent, philologist, translator
- Parent: Henrik Rytter (father)

Olav Rytter (29 January 1903 – 7 June 1992) was a Norwegian newspaper editor, radio personality, foreign correspondent, philologist and translator.

== Biography ==
Olav was born in Kristiansund as the son of writer Henrik Rytter. He took his philological education at the University of Oslo and the University of Prague, having specialized in Slavic and Indic languages. He would translate several works written in such languages. After working as a teacher in the Norwegian language in Prague and Warsaw, from 1928 to 1935, he returned to Norway in 1935 to edit the newspaper Norsk Tidend. He became a member of the Norwegian Association for Women's Rights in 1936.

From 1938 to 1946, he was a programme secretary in the Norwegian Broadcasting Corporation (NRK). When Norway was invaded by Germany in April 1940, Rytter fled the country together with the Norwegian royal family and cabinet. After a short period in Stockholm he reunited with the Norwegian authorities-in-exile in London, where he worked for the NRK and BBC until 1944. He received basic military training, in Scotland. He has also been credited with suggesting Martin Linge as an SOE agent in the fall of 1940. In 1944 Rytter travelled to Finnmark to oversee the liberation of Northern Norway as an officer of information. Norway was fully liberated on 8 May 1945.

From 1948 to 1963, Rytter worked with information for the United Nations. He headed their Prague information office from 1948 to 1953, helped establishing new offices in Jakarta, Teheran and Afghanistan over the next years, before heading the Cairo office from 1959 to 1963. In 1963, he returned to Norway to edit the newspaper Dag og Tid. He stepped down from this position after short time, but continued working from 1964 to 1974 as a foreign correspondent.

Rytter died in June 1992. He donated his entire literature collection to the University of Oslo.
