= Henrik Rytter =

Norwegian dramatist, lyricist and translator

Henrik Grytnes Rytter (18 January 1877 – 18 September 1950) was a Norwegian dramatist, lyricist and translator.

== Theatrical works and lyrics ==
He was born in Bjørnør Municipality. He made his debut in 1907, with the drama Dømde. Later plays include Bråhamaren (1917), Herman Ravn (1924), Våren (1926), Elva (1937) and Prestegarden og øya (1941). All were staged at Det Norske Teatret. As a lyricist, Rytter's works include Båra (1919), Øya (1920), the trilogy Jordsonen (1925), Skålene (1926) and Vokune (1927), as well as Eros (1928) and Likevel -! (1950).

== Translations ==
Rytter also made a mark as a translator. He translated works of William Shakespeare as well as Peer Gynt and the Divine Comedy into Nynorsk; and The Decameron into Bokmål.

== Service as a high school headmaster ==
He was also the headmaster of Nordmøre folk high school from 1913 to 1916.

== Child ==
He was the father of Olav Rytter.
