= Queen Mette-Marit of Norway =

Queen of Norway since 2026

Mette-Marit
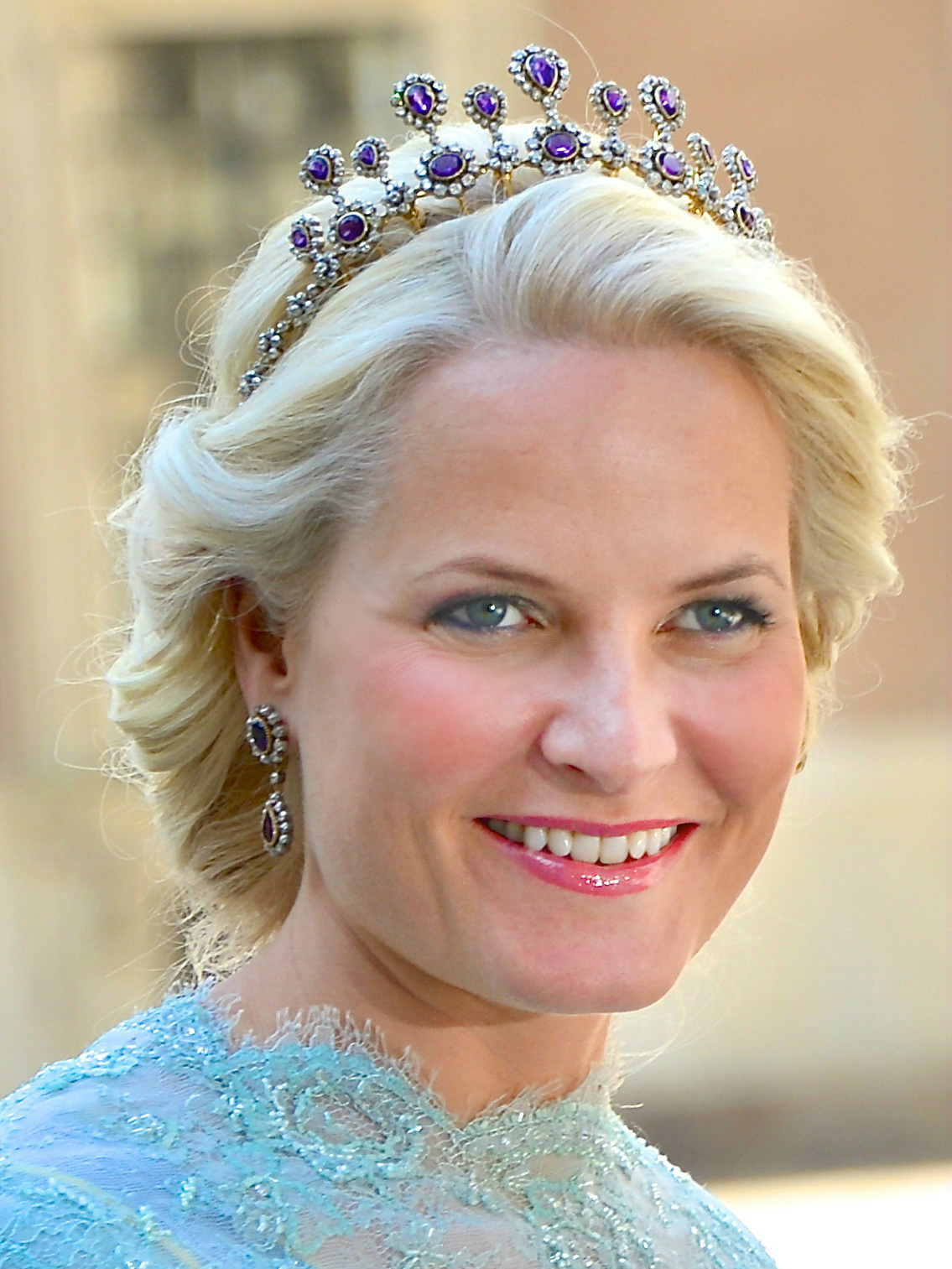
- Mette-Marit in 2013

Queen consort of Norway
- Tenure: 28 August 2026 – present
- Born: Mette-Marit Tjessem Høiby; 19 August 1973 (age 53); Kristiansand, Vest-Agder, Norway
- Spouse: Haakon VIII (m. 2001)
- Issue: Marius Borg Høiby; Crown Princess Ingrid Alexandra; Prince Sverre Magnus
- House: Glücksburg (by marriage)
- Father: Sven O. Høiby
- Religion: Church of Norway

Mette-Marit (born Mette-Marit Tjessem Høiby; (Note: pronounced [ˌmɛtːəˈmɑ̀ːrɪt ˈçɛ̀sːəm ˈhœ̀ʏbʏ]) 19 August 1973) is Queen of Norway as the wife of King Haakon VIII.

The couple have two children, Crown Princess Ingrid Alexandra and Prince Sverre Magnus. Mette‑Marit also has an older son, Marius Borg Høiby. Mette-Marit's tenure as crown princess was marked by controversies related to past relationships, her friendship with convicted sex offender Jeffrey Epstein, and her older son's rape conviction in a lower court. She was diagnosed with pulmonary fibrosis in 2018 and underwent a lung transplant in 2026.

== Early life, education, and early adulthood ==
Mette-Marit Tjessem Høiby was born on 19 August 1973 in Kristiansand, Norway, the daughter of Sven O. Høiby, who had worked as a small‑scale advertiser and as a journalist for a local newspaper, and Marit Tjessem, a bank clerk. Her parents later divorced, and both subsequently remarried. She has two older brothers and one sister. Trond Berntsen, Mette-Marit's stepbrother from her mother's 1994 marriage to Rolf Berntsen, was killed in the 2011 Norway attacks.

Mette-Marit first began her upper secondary education at Oddernes Upper Secondary School in Kristiansand. She spent six months as an exchange student at Wangaratta High School in Victoria, Australia, through the organisation Youth For Understanding. She then completed her studies at Kristiansand Cathedral School in 1994. As a part‑time student, Mette-Marit took six years to complete her secondary education. She subsequently undertook preparatory courses at Agder College and worked as a waitress at Café Engebret in Oslo. Mette-Marit has taken a number of university‑level courses. In 2002 and 2003, she audited lectures in development studies at SOAS University of London, although this did not result in a degree. In 2012, she completed a master's degree in executive management at BI Norwegian Business School.

== Personal life ==
During the 1990s, Mette‑Marit was in a relationship with John Ognby, who had been convicted of drug‑related offences. Their relationship progressed to the point of purchasing a wedding dress. Mette-Marit ended the relationship after he allegedly chased after her with a knife. Mette‑Marit gave birth to a son, Marius Borg Høiby, on 13 January 1997. His father is Morten Borg. Mette-Marit and Borg were not in a relationship, and he was serving a prison sentence for drug‑related violent offences at the time of Marius's birth.

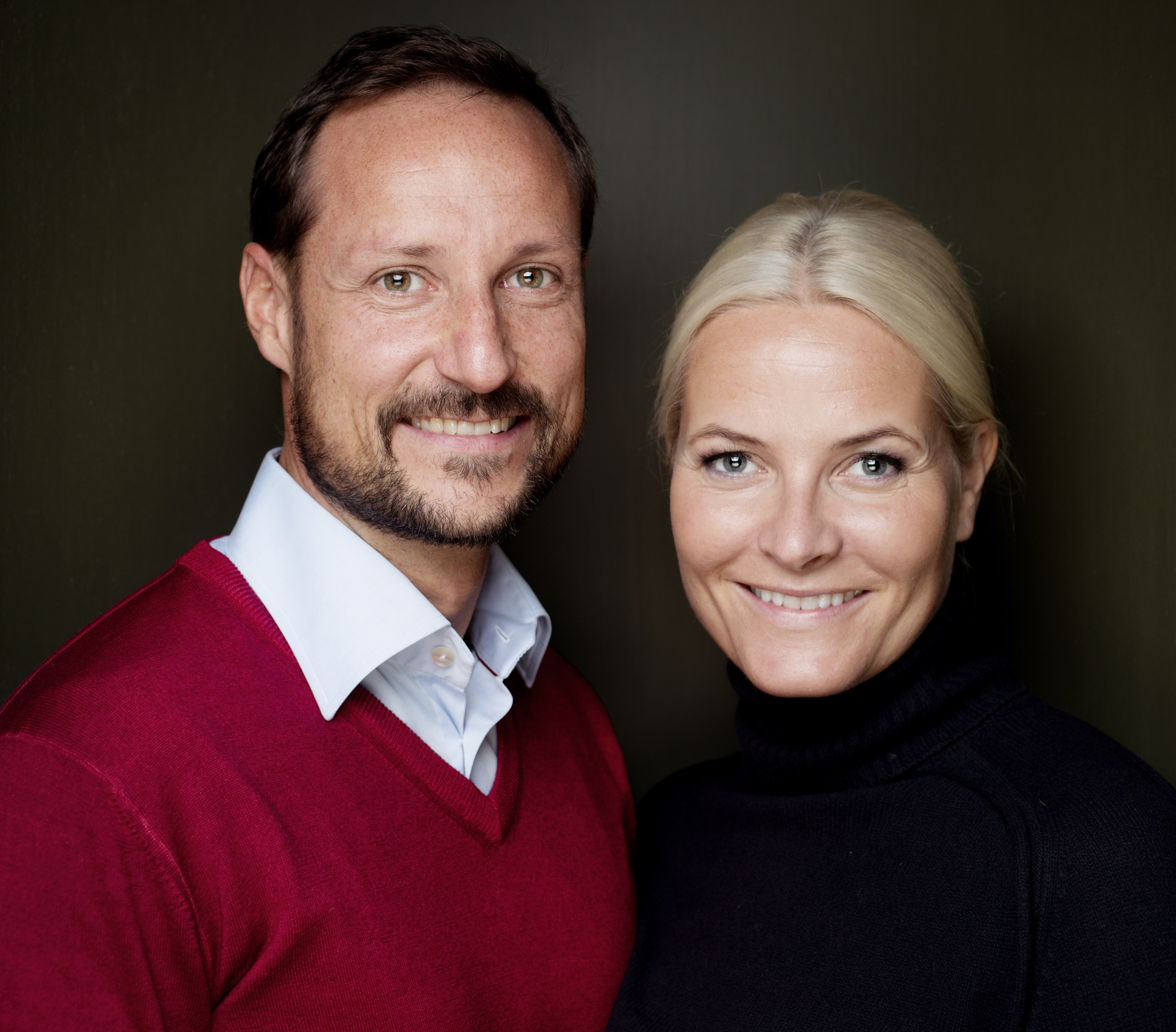
Haakon and Mette-Marit in 2014

From 1997 to 1998, Mette‑Marit lived in Oslo with Marius and with her then‑partner, a disc jockey. From 1998 to 1999, she lived in Kristiansand with Marius and another disc jockey with whom she was in a relationship. In the 1990s, Mette-Marit attended the Quart Festival in Kristiansand, where she first met Crown Prince Haakon at a garden party during the festival season. They met again several years later after she had become a mother.

Mette-Marit and Haakon announced their engagement in December 2000. Public and media reaction was mixed. Mette-Marit's commoner background, lack of education, previous relationships with convicts and socialization in a milieu "where drugs were readily available" were often cited by critics. Princess Ragnhild, Mrs. Lorentzen publicly expressed concern about the match; she added that she felt sorry for Mette-Marit's son, Marius Høiby, who would not have a royal title. The couple's eight-month engagement included a period of cohabitation in an Oslo apartment, drawing criticism from some within the Church of Norway. Before marrying Haakon, Mette-Marit apologised to the public for her "wild past". They married on 25 August 2001 at Oslo Cathedral. The couple have two children: Crown Princess Ingrid Alexandra (born 21 January 2004), and Prince Sverre Magnus (born 3 December 2005). In 2007, TV2 broadcast the documentary Mette-Marit – vår tids Askepott ("Mette-Marit – Cinderella of Our Time").

=== Health ===
Mette-Marit has experienced a series of health difficulties, including pneumonia, several instances of norovirus, low blood pressure, falls, concussions, a neck injury, and a herniated disc.

In October 2018, Mette-Marit was diagnosed with pulmonary fibrosis. She stated that she would receive treatment at Oslo University Hospital. On 9 March 2026, it was reported that Mette‑Marit's health had worsened following her most recent public engagement on 28 January, with her condition described as "delicate". On 17 March, the palace stated that Mette-Marit's health had "deteriorated" and that she would not take part in the state visit of the King and Queen of Belgium. She later appeared with them at the Royal Palace on 24 March. On 10 April, at a reception for Norwegian athletes who competed at the 2026 Winter Paralympics, Mette-Marit used a nasal cannula connected to an oxygen device.

In June, the palace announced that Mette‑Marit had been placed on the waiting list for a lung transplant. Her condition was described as "life-threatening", and doctors indicated that she was likely to have approximately one year to live if she did not receive the transplant. Later that month, it was announced that she had undergone a successful transplant. She was discharged from Oslo University Hospital on 14 July. On 1 September, she cancelled her attendance at her husband's taking of the oath of allegiance to the Constitution of Norway, with her pulmonologist announcing that her absence was due to complications she had been experiencing after the lung transplant.

== Crown Princess of Norway ==
Early in her role as Crown Princess, Mette‑Marit undertook an internship at the Norwegian Agency for Development Cooperation. Mette-Marit became a UNAIDS International Goodwill Ambassador in 2006, focusing on youth engagement in the global response to HIV and AIDS. She has participated in international conferences and visited several countries to highlight UNAIDS' work. At the 2014 United Nations General Assembly, she spoke about the impact of stigma and discrimination on efforts to combat HIV and AIDS. During a visit to Mali, she highlighted the opportunities social media provides to empower young people in new areas of advocacy. She also opened the Youth Pavilion at the XVIII International AIDS Conference.

In 2012, Mette-Marit faced criticism for assisting a Norwegian couple in obtaining surrogacy services in India; surrogacy is prohibited in Norway. Women's rights groups expressed concern about the ethical implications of commercial surrogacy in developing countries. In 2015, Mette‑Marit and Kate Roberts, a senior vice‑president at Population Services International, established the Maverick Collective. On 26 April 2017, she was appointed ambassador for Norwegian literature in the international arena.

Public opinion regarding Mette‑Marit has varied over time. A poll conducted by VG in February 2026 reported that 44% of respondents did not wish to see Mette‑Marit become queen, while 32.5% supported the prospect. Earlier media reports in 2025 described her as relatively unpopular.

=== Friendship with Jeffrey Epstein ===
Mette-Marit maintained contact with the American convicted sex offender Jeffrey Epstein between 2011 and 2014. At the time she entered into a friendship with Epstein, Norwegian media had identified him as a "convicted pedophile". In 2019, Norwegian and international media reported that she met him several times between 2011 and 2013; at that time, he had been released from prison after his 2008 conviction for sex offences involving minors.

The Royal Palace's communications manager said in late 2025 that Mette‑Marit had ceased contact with Epstein in 2013. This claim was contradicted by the 2026 release of the Epstein files. Documents regarding Epstein released by the U.S. Department of Justice in February 2026 mentioned Mette-Marit nearly 1,000 times. Mette-Marit and Epstein reportedly traded dozens of e-mails long after he had pleaded guilty to sexual misconduct involving minors. Mette-Marit reportedly called Epstein "soft-hearted", "such a sweetheart", and "very charming". She also reportedly asked Epstein if it was "inappropriate" for her to "suggest two naked women carrying a surfboard" for her 15-year-old son's wallpaper. In correspondence about Epstein’s "wife hunt", she reportedly replied that Paris was "good for adultery", but that "Scandis (are) better wife material".

As a result of the Epstein scandal, Mette-Marit was stripped of her patronage of Sex og Samfunn, a major NGO. Other organisations discussed removing her as patron. In February 2026, a poll showed that 45% of Norwegians believed Mette-Marit should not become queen, while 29% supported her becoming queen. In response to ongoing debate over whether Mette-Marit could serve as queen, legal scholar Eivind Smith said that it would be possible for Haakon to become king and to remain married to Mette-Marit without Mette‑Marit becoming queen or holding any public title; titles are decided by the monarch. International media have extensively covered scandals involving the Norwegian royal family, linking them to Epstein, rape allegations, and controversy.

In March 2026, the board of the Norwegian Girls' Choir stated that Mette-Marit's connections to Epstein had caused unrest within the organisation. The board moved to remove her as patron. The decision is pending a membership vote. On 19 March 2026, Mette-Marit and her husband participated in a controversial interview that was published the next day. The interview covered Mette-Marit's connection with Jeffrey Epstein. Tove Taalesen, an expert regarding the royal family of Norway, said that Mette-Marit should not become queen. She added that the interview was a missed chance to provide the public with acceptable answers. On 28 April 2026, The Amandus Festival became another foundation to sever collaboration ties with Mette-Marit in response to revelations about her Epstein ties. Other foundations to sever collaboration with her include Fokus, the Norwegian Library Association, and the Mental Health Council.

=== Marius Høiby legal case ===
On 18 August 2025, Mette-Marit's son, Marius Borg Høiby, was charged with 32 offences. The charges included allegations of rape and acts of violence against two former partners. Some media outlets claimed that he and his family had received preferential treatment from police, though authorities did not confirm this. Other reports alleged that Mette‑Marit had warned her son about an impending arrest and interfered with the investigation, but no charges have been filed against her.

Borg Høiby's trial for the August 2025 indictment began on 3 February 2026. Shortly beforehand, he was arrested and remanded in custody on additional charges, followed in March by further charges of reckless behaviour and violating a restraining order. In total, he faced forty charges, some of which he admitted. The most serious charges carry potential sentences of more than ten years' imprisonment.

The Høiby case has been described in Norwegian media as one of the most extensive rape investigations in recent years. It has also been cited as contributing to a decline in the Norwegian royal family's reputation and increased debate about the future of the monarchy in Norway. On 15 June 2026, Høiby was convicted of two counts of rape, one count of domestic violence, and other offences. He was acquitted of two other rape charges, and was sentenced to four years in prison; however, his case is under appeal and the verdict is not final.

== Queen consort ==
Following the death of King Harald V on 28 August 2026 and the accession of her husband as King Haakon VIII, Mette-Marit became Norway's queen consort.

The Norwegian royal court has announced that Haakon and Mette-Marit will be consecrated at Nidaros Cathedral in Trondheim on 22 August 2027.

== Titles, styles and honours ==
=== Titles ===
From her marriage until her husband's accession, Mette-Marit was styled "Her Royal Highness The Crown Princess". Since then she has been styled "Her Majesty The Queen".

=== Arms ===
Coat of arms

Monogram

=== Honours and medals ===
==== National honours and medals ====
- Norway: Grand Cross with Collar of the Royal Norwegian Order of Saint Olav
- Norway: Dame of the Royal Family Decoration of King Harald V
- Norway: Recipient of the Medal of the 100th Anniversary of the Birth of King Olav V
- Norway: Recipient of the Royal House Centenary Medal
- Norway: Recipient of the King Harald V Silver Jubilee Medal

==== Foreign honours ====
- Austria: Grand Cross, 1st Class of the Order of Honour for Services to the Republic of Austria
- Belgium: Grand Cross of the Order of the Crown (24 March 2026)
- Brazil: Grand Cross of the Order of the Southern Cross
- Bulgaria: Grand Cross of the Order of the Balkan Mountains
- Denmark: Knight of the Order of the Elephant
- Estonia: Grand Cross of the Order of the Cross of Terra Mariana
- Estonia: Grand Cross of the Order of the White Star
- Finland: Grand Cross of the Order of the White Rose of Finland
- France: Grand Officer of the National Order of the Legion of Honour (23 June 2025)
- Germany: Grand Cross, 1st Class of the Order of Merit of the Federal Republic of Germany
- Iceland: Grand Cross of the Order of the Falcon
- Italy: Grand Cross of the Order of Merit of the Italian Republic
- Japan: Grand Cordon of the Order of the Precious Crown
- Latvia: Grand Cross of the Order of the Cross of Recognition
- Lithuania: Grand Cross of the Order of Vytautas the Great
- Luxembourg: Dame Grand Cross of the Order of Adolphe of Nassau
- Netherlands: Dame Grand Cross of the Order of Orange-Nassau
- Netherlands: Recipient of the King Willem-Alexander Inauguration Medal
- Poland: Grand Cross of the Order of Merit of the Republic of Poland
- Portugal: Grand Cross of the Order of Prince Henry
- Spain: Dame Grand Cross of the Order of Isabella the Catholic
- Sweden: Member Grand Cross of the Royal Order of the Polar Star

== Notes ==
Norwegian royalty
| Preceded by Sonja Haraldsen | Queen consort of Norway; 2026–present | Incumbent |
