= Prince Sverre Magnus of Norway =

Norwegian prince (born 2005)

Prince Sverre Magnus
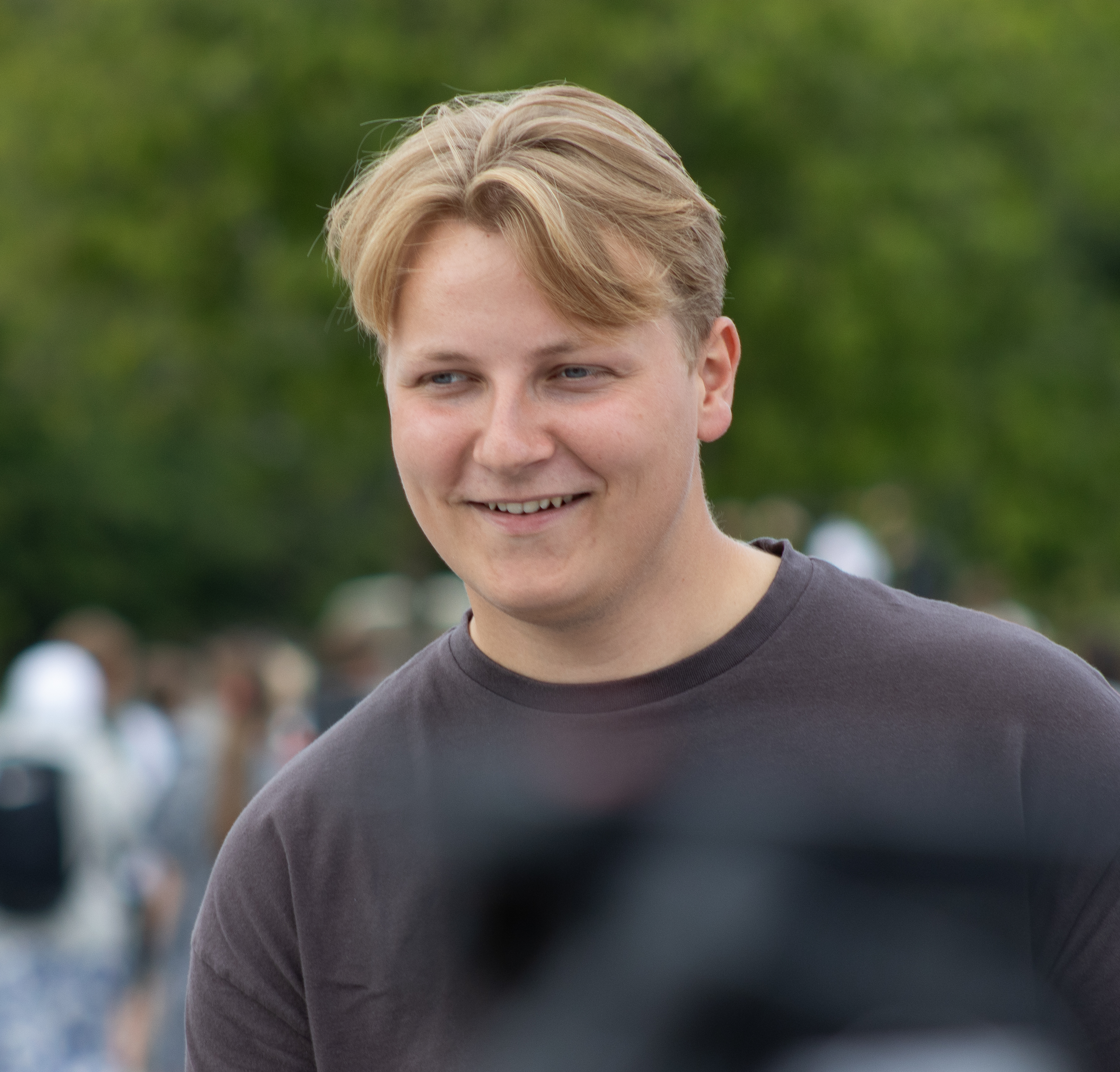
- Sverre Magnus in 2025
- Born: 3 December 2005 (age 20); The National Hospital, Oslo, Norway
- House: Glücksburg
- Father: Haakon VIII
- Mother: Mette-Marit Tjessem Høiby
- Religion: Church of Norway

Prince Sverre Magnus of Norway (born 3 December 2005) is the younger child of King Haakon VIII and Queen Mette-Marit. He is second in line to succeed his father, after his sister Crown Princess Ingrid Alexandra.

== Early life and education ==
Sverre Magnus was born on 3 December 2005 at The National Hospital, part of Oslo University Hospital in Oslo, where his elder sister, Princess Ingrid Alexandra, had been born just under two years earlier. He is the younger child of King Haakon VIII and Queen Mette-Marit. He was baptised by Bishop Ole Christian Kvarme at the chapel of the Royal Palace in Oslo on 4 March 2006. (Note: His godparents are his paternal grandmother, the Queen of Norway; Queen Máxima of the Netherlands; the Crown Prince of Greece; Princess Rosario of Bulgaria; his maternal uncle Espen Høiby; and his parents' friends, Bjørn Steinsland and Marianne Gjellestad.)

He was named in honour of King Sverre of Norway, one of the most important rulers in Norwegian history, and Magnus, after the Norwegian saint and martyr.

Beginning on 18 August 2011, Sverre Magnus attended Jansløkka elementary school, a local state school also attended by his elder sister and half-brother, Marius Borg Høiby. On 17 June 2014, the Norwegian Royal Family announced that, from the start of the 2014–2015 school year, Sverre Magnus would transfer to Oslo's private Montessori school. He remained there until 2021. In autumn 2021, he began attending Elvebakken Upper Secondary School in Oslo, the same school his older sister had attended, following the Information Technology and Media Production (IM) line. He graduated on 18 June 2024.

== Personal life ==
Sverre Magnus was in a relationship with Amalie Giæver MacLeod from at least 2024 until early December 2025.

=== Activities and leisure interests ===
In 2017 the then 11 year old Sverre Magnus gained notoriety for dabbing on the balcony of the Royal Palace in the presence of the rest of the royal family, including his grandfather King Harald V. The dance move was performed unprompted. He enjoys skiing and biking, primarily BMX and cross, and shares the family's interest in water sports, especially surfing. In an interview with his sister to mark his 18th birthday, he said that skiing is his favourite sport.

In late 2025, the Royal House announced that he was staying in Italy to explore career opportunities in film and photography. In April 2026, Nettavisen reported that it was unclear whether Sverre Magnus planned to complete first-time military service, and that the Palace had not responded to the newspaper's questions about his future plans.

In April 2026, he and three others represented the royal family in a meeting with an NGO. Representation involving only Sverre Magnus and his father occurred several times in Q2 2026. He owns a commercial enterprise, and on occasion has represented the royal family together with at least one other member of the family.

== Constitutional status ==
Royal monogram

The Constitution of Norway was amended in 1990 to introduce absolute primogeniture, ensuring that the crown would pass to the eldest child regardless of sex but keeping Crown Prince Haakon ahead of his elder sister, Princess Märtha Louise. This change applied for the first time to the children of the Crown Prince, meaning that Sverre Magnus would not rank above his older sister, as would have happened under prior constitutional rules. Sverre Magnus is second in the line of succession to the Norwegian throne following his elder sister. He is a member of the Royal Family but not of the Royal House, which consists only of his grandmother, parents and elder sister.

== Honours ==
=== National ===
- Grand Cross of the Royal Norwegian Order of Saint Olav (3 December 2023)
- Recipient of King Harald V's Jubilee Medal 1991-2016 (17 January 2016)

=== Arms ===

Prince Sverre Magnus of Norway House of Glücksburg Born: 3 December 2005
Lines of succession
Preceded by The Crown Princess of Norway	Succession to the Norwegian throne 2nd position	Succeeded by Princess Märtha Louise
