= Haakon VIII =

King of Norway since 2026

- Haakon in 2026

King of Norway
- Reign: 28 August 2026 – present
- Predecessor: Harald V
- Heir apparent: Ingrid Alexandra

Regent of Norway
- Regency: See list: 25 November 2003 – 12 April 2004; 29 March 2005 – 7 June 2005; 25 September 2020 – 31 October 2020; 3 March 2024 – 22 April 2024; 18 August 2026 – 28 August 2026
- Monarch: Harald V
- Born: 20 July 1973 (age 53); The National Hospital, Oslo, Norway
- Spouse: Mette-Marit Tjessem Høiby (m. 2001)
- Issue: Crown Princess Ingrid Alexandra; Prince Sverre Magnus
Names
- Haakon Magnus
- House: Glücksburg
- Father: Harald V
- Mother: Sonja Haraldsen
- Religion: Church of Norway
- Education: University of California, Berkeley (BA); London School of Economics (MSc)
- Military career
- Allegiance: Norway
- Branch: Royal Norwegian Navy
- Service years: 1995–1996
- Rank: Lieutenant

Haakon VIII (Haakon Magnus; born 20 July 1973) is King of Norway. He ascended the throne on 28 August 2026.

He is the second child and only son of King Harald V and Queen Sonja. Haakon represents the fourth generation of the reigning Norwegian royal family of the House of Glücksburg. He married Mette-Marit Tjessem Høiby in 2001, and they have two children, Crown Princess Ingrid Alexandra and Prince Sverre Magnus.

Haakon acceded to the throne upon his father's death in 2026. He is a trained naval officer and, as king, is formally the Supreme Commander of the Norwegian Armed Forces. He has served as a goodwill ambassador for the United Nations Development Programme and has been involved in a range of philanthropic and international initiatives, including membership of the Young Global Leaders network and its Foundation Board. He holds a Bachelor of Arts degree in political science from the University of California, Berkeley, and a Master of Science in development studies from the London School of Economics.

== Early life and family ==
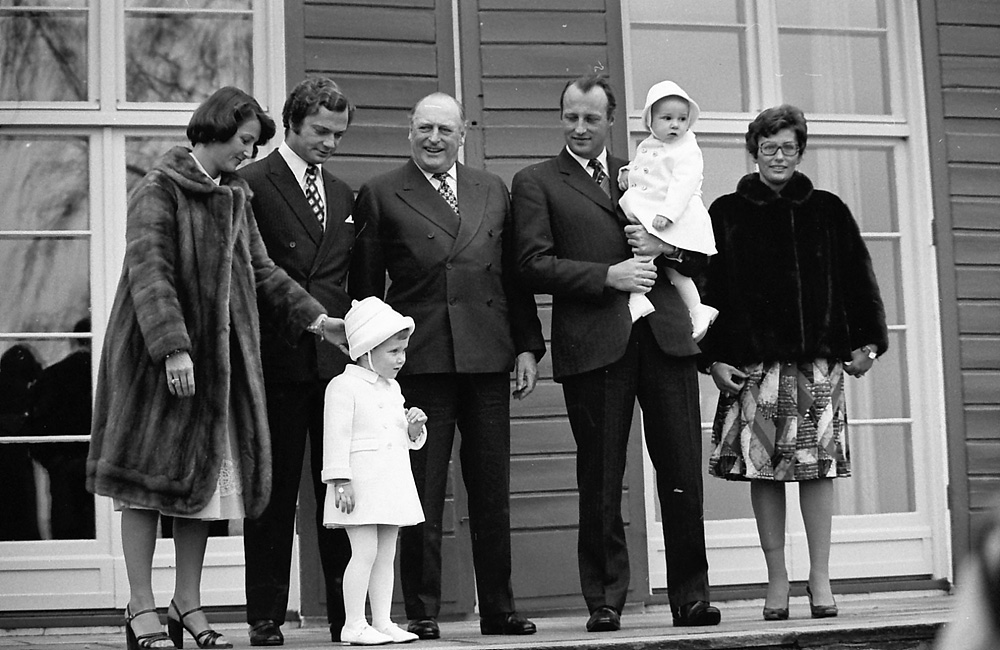
The future Harald V, then Crown Prince (second from right, standing), holding his son Prince Haakon in his arms and surrounded (from left to right) by, then, Crown Princess Sonja, King Carl XVI Gustaf of Sweden, Princess Märtha Louise, King Olav V and Princess Astrid, in 1974

Haakon was born on 20 July 1973 at The National Hospital in St Hanshaugen, Oslo, the only son and younger child of then-Crown Prince Harald]] and Crown Princess Sonja, during the reign of his paternal grandfather King Olav V. At birth he was named Haakon Magnus, and the announcement emphasised that he would be known as Haakon. He was baptised on 20 September in the chapel at the Royal Palace. (Note: His godparents were King Olav V of Norway (his paternal grandfather); Princess Astrid, Mrs. Ferner (his paternal aunt); Prince Carl Bernadotte (his paternal granduncle); King Carl XVI Gustaf of Sweden (his paternal third cousin); Queen Margrethe II of Denmark (his paternal second cousin once removed); and Princess Anne of the United Kingdom (his paternal third cousin).) He was named in honour of his paternal great-grandfather, King Haakon VII, as well as his maternal uncle Haakon Haraldsen, and Magnus, after the Norwegian saint and martyr. Haakon's grandfather Olav V died on 17 January 1991, after which his father acceded as King Harald V and Haakon became crown prince.

Haakon has one sibling, Princess Märtha Louise (born 1971). In 1990, the Norwegian constitution was amended to introduce absolute primogeniture, meaning that the eldest child, regardless of sex, would take precedence in the line of succession. Because the amendment was not retroactive, Haakon retained precedence over his older sister.

=== Education and military service ===
Haakon served in the Royal Norwegian Navy. He graduated from the Norwegian Naval Academy in 1995, then spent a year serving on various naval vessels with the rank of lieutenant. Unlike his father and grandfather, he did not attend Oxford University and instead enrolled at the University of California, Berkeley. He received a Bachelor of Arts degree in political science in 1999. Haakon subsequently attended lectures at the University of Oslo and completed the Norwegian Ministry of Foreign Affairs' civil servant introductory course in 2001. He finished his education in 2003 at the London School of Economics (LSE), where he was awarded a Master of Science in development studies, specialising in international trade and Africa.

As of 15 November 2013, Haakon's rank in the Royal Norwegian Navy is admiral, and in the Norwegian Army and the Royal Norwegian Air Force his rank is general. In 2016, Haakon completed the Norwegian Army's paratrooper course and was certified as a military paratrooper. The course was administered by the Special Operations Commando.

== Crown Prince ==
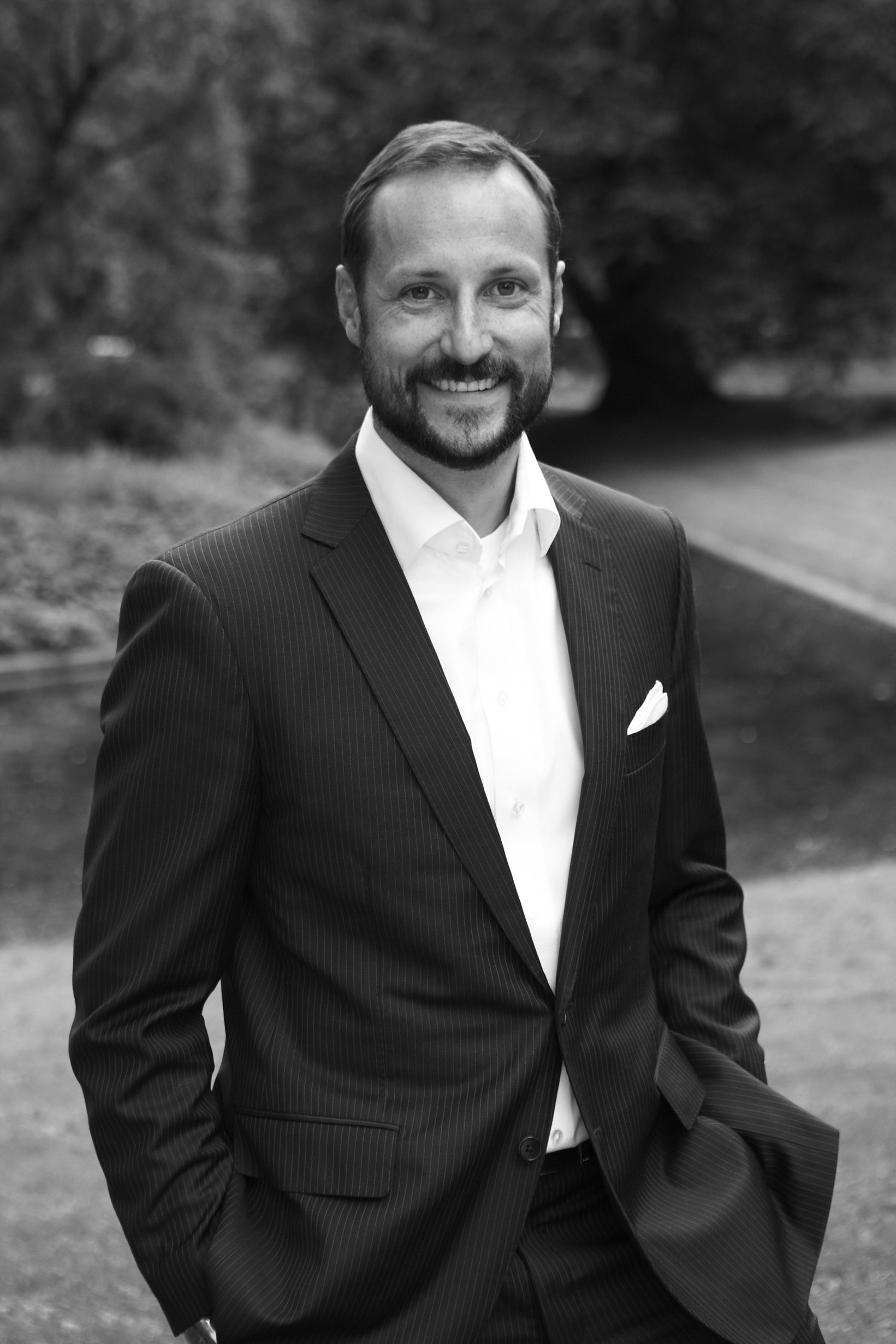
Haakon as Crown Prince, 2010

Haakon served as regent several times when Harald's failing health prevented him from carrying out his duties. In 2003, Haakon was appointed a goodwill ambassador for the United Nations Development Programme (UNDP). In 2013, he established the SIKT conference. He regularly attends the annual conference of the Confederation of Norwegian Enterprise (NHO), and in 2016 he met the Norwegian Confederation of Trade Unions (LO) for an introduction to Norway's tripartite cooperation model.

Haakon was a member of the Young Global Leaders (YGL) network from 2005 until 2010, and from 2010 to 2017 he served on the YGL Foundation Board. Haakon and Mette‑Marit established the Crown Prince and Crown Princess's Foundation. He is a patron of 4H Norge, ANSA, the Ibsen Stage Festival, the Nordland Music Festival, and several other organisations. In 2017, he became a patron of the Norwegian Refugee Council. In May 2022, Haakon joined a University of Tromsø expedition aimed at disseminating knowledge about polar history and scientific research taking place in the Arctic. Over the course of two weeks, he crossed the Greenland ice sheet using a snowkite. Following the 2022 Oslo shooting, Haakon stated, "We must protect the right in Norway to love whomever we want."

In October 2025, Haakon visited Decorah, Iowa, to celebrate 200 years since the first organized Norwegian emigration to the United States. At the celebration convocation at Luther College, Haakon was awarded an honorary degree of Doctor of Civil Law, the same honor given to his father Harald - as crown prince - 60 years earlier. Olav V as crown prince also received an honorary degree from Luther in 1939.

In 2026, Haakon crewed the Myklebust Ship as a rower with Prince Sverre Magnus. The footage from the event was later used by the royal house to support the Norway national football team in response to the Viking Row cheer performed by supporters during the 2026 FIFA World Cup. Following Norway's victory over Brazil during the knockout stage, Haakon joined supporters outside the Royal Palace in Oslo to participate in a synchronised Viking Row celebration. Upon the return of the Norwegian national football team, Haakon led a Viking Row in front of over 150,000 people gathered outside the Royal Palace as part of the official reception. He was joined by Ingrid Alexandra and Sverre Magnus. In addition to his official duties, Haakon has a strong interest in cultural matters and has given patronage to a number of organisations. In 2006, he was one of three founders of Global Dignity, alongside Pekka Himanen and John Hope Bryant.

== Reign ==
Upon the death of his father on 28 August 2026, Haakon VIII succeeded to the Norwegian throne. That morning, he met the Council of State for his first King-in-Council as reigning monarch, officially notifying the council of his father's death and announcing his regnal name and royal motto. His chosen motto, Alt for Norge (lit. 'All for Norway'), had been used by every Norwegian monarch since his great-grandfather, Haakon VII.

On 29 August, Haakon delivered his first address to the nation as king at the Royal Palace in Oslo. He spoke of his coming responsibilities, his family, and commemorated the life of his father.

Haakon took an oath of allegiance to the Constitution of Norway in the Storting on 1 September. His benediction is scheduled to take place on 22 August 2027 at Nidaros Cathedral.

== Personal life ==
=== Personal interests ===
Haakon has long been involved in sport and has shown a particular interest in windsurfing and surfing, although he has not competed at a professional level. He is also known as an enthusiastic music fan and has attended and hosted several music festivals.

Haakon has taken part in several Olympic ceremonies. At the 1994 Winter Olympics in Lillehammer, King Harald declared the Games open while Haakon lit the cauldron. In 2016, his daughter Ingrid Alexandra performed the same role at the II Winter Youth Olympics, also held in Lillehammer.

Haakon accompanied the band Katzenjammer in their recording of the song "Vi tenner våre lykter" ("We light our lanterns") for their 2011 Christmas-themed album of the same name. Proceeds benefited "Their Royal Highnesses The Crown Prince and Crown Princess funds".

=== Marriage ===
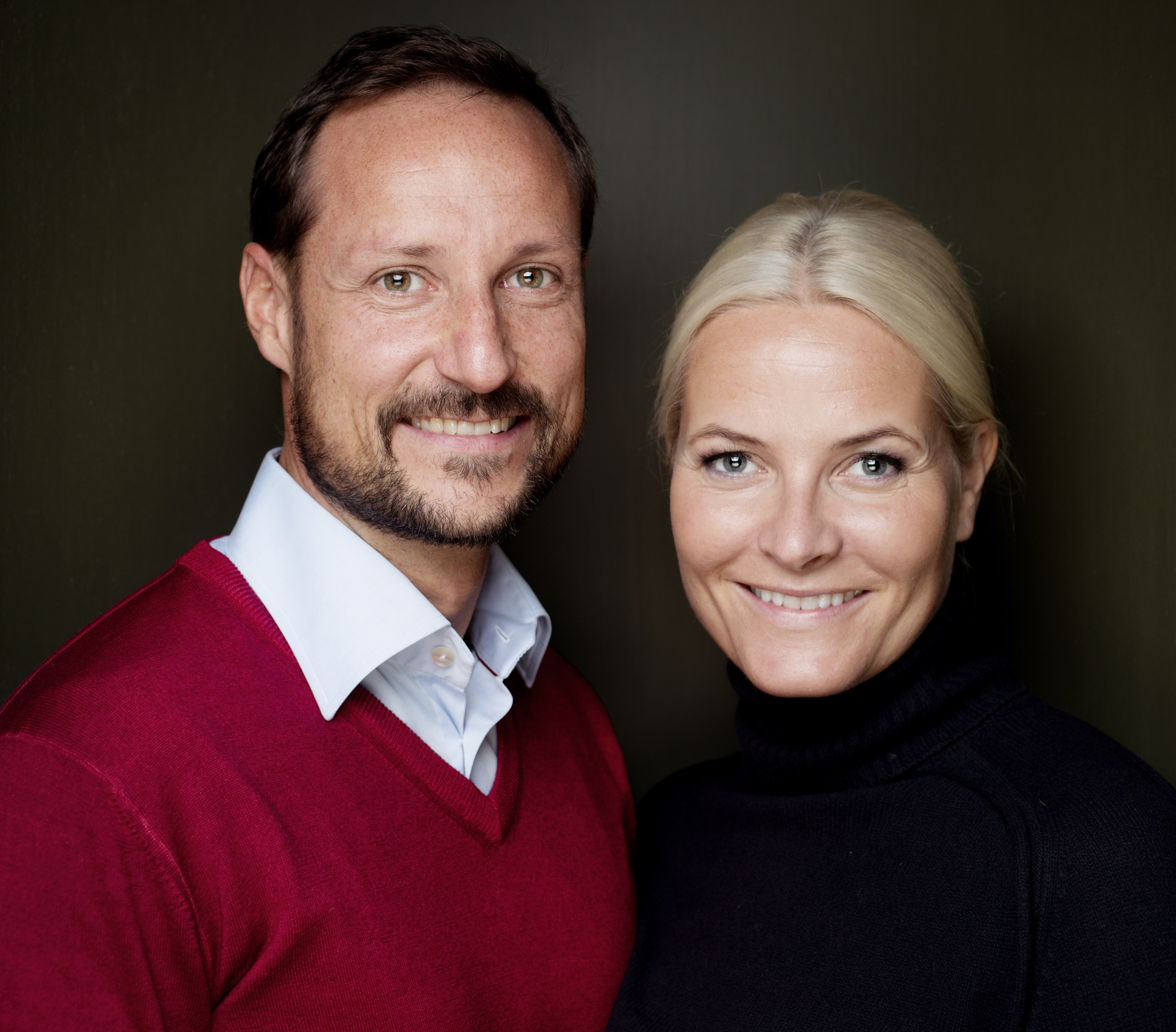
Haakon and Mette-Marit in 2014

In the 1990s, Haakon attended the Quart Festival in Kristiansand, where he first met Mette-Marit Tjessem Høiby, a commoner, at a garden party during the festival season. They met again several years later when she was the single mother of Marius Borg Høiby. When their engagement was announced in December 2000, public and media reaction was largely negative. Many Norwegians expressed concern about Haakon's choice of partner, primarily due to Mette-Marit's status as an unmarried mother. The father of her child had been convicted of drug-related offences, and critics also highlighted her limited formal education, previous relationships with convicted felons, and her social circle, which some commentators described as one "where drugs were readily available". The couple's eight-month engagement included a period of cohabitation in an Oslo apartment, a decision that drew criticism from the Church of Norway, an evangelical Lutheran denomination.

Haakon and Mette-Marit married on 25 August 2001 at Oslo Cathedral. Frederik, Crown Prince of Denmark, later King Frederik X, served as best man. They have two children: Crown Princess Ingrid Alexandra (born 21 January 2004 at Oslo University National Hospital) and Prince Sverre Magnus (born 3 December 2005 at the same hospital). Haakon is also the stepfather of Marius Borg Høiby. Their official residence is the Skaugum Estate, situated near Semsvannet.

Mette-Marit had contact with convicted sex offender Jeffrey Epstein over several years, while Haakon had met Epstein only once, according to the Royal Palace's communications manager, Guri Varpe.

=== Other relationships ===
Although briefly dating cosmetic heiress Celina Midelfart in 1993, Haakon's first publicly known and official relationship was with model Cathrine Knudsen, with whom he was involved from 1994 to 1996. Haakon has also been in brief romantic relationships with violinist Marte Krogh and physiotherapist Mona Woll Håland.

== Titles, styles, honours and awards ==
=== Titles ===
- 20 July 1973 – 17 January 1991: His Royal Highness Prince Haakon
- 17 January 1991 – 28 August 2026: His Royal Highness The Crown Prince
- 28 August 2026 – present: His Majesty The King

=== Arms ===
Royal coat of arms

Royal standard

Monogram as Prince

=== National honours and medals ===
- Grand Master and Grand Cross with Collar of the Royal Norwegian Order of Saint Olav °
- Grand Master and Grand Cross of the Royal Norwegian Order of Merit °
- Defence Service Medal with Laurel Branch °
- Royal House Centennial Medal °
- Olav V's Commemorative Medal °
- Olav V's Jubilee Medal °
- Olav V's Centenary Medal °
- King Harald V's Jubilee Medal 1991–2016
- Royal Norwegian Navy Service Medal °
- Norwegian Reserve Officers' Association Badge of Honour °
- Naval Society Medal of Merit in gold °
- Oslo Military Society Badge of Honour in Gold °

==== Foreign honours ====
- Austria: Grand Decoration in Gold with Sash of the Order of Honour for Services to the Republic of Austria
- Belgium: Grand Cross of the Order of the Crown ° (24 March 2026)
- Bulgaria: Grand Cross of the Order of the Balkan Mountains
- Denmark: Knight of Order of the Elephant ° (20 July 1991)
- Estonia: Member 1st Class of Order of the Cross of Terra Mariana ° (10 April 2002)
- Estonia: Member 1st Class of Order of the White Star (26 August 2014)
- Finland: Grand Cross with Collar of the Order of the White Rose of Finland (15 October 2024) °
- France: Grand Officer of the National Order of the Legion of Honour (23 June 2025)
- Germany: Grand Cross 1st class of the Order of Merit of the Federal Republic of Germany °
- Iceland: Grand Cross of the Order of the Falcon.
- Italy: Knight Grand Cross of the Order of Merit of the Italian Republic ° (20 September 2004)
- Japan: Grand Cordon of the Order of the Chrysanthemum
- Jordan: Grand Cordon of the Supreme Order of the Renaissance
- Latvia: Commander Grand Cross of the Order of the Three Stars (20 September 2000) °
- Latvia: Recipient of the 1st Class of Cross of Recognition ° (12 March 2015)
- Lithuania: Grand Cross of the Order of Vytautas the Great ° (23 March 2011) °
- Luxembourg: Grand Cross of the Order of Adolph of Nassau °
- Netherlands: Knight Grand Cross with Swords of the Order of Orange-Nassau °
- Netherlands: HM King Willem-Alexander Investiture Medal
- Poland: Grand Cross of the Order of Merit of the Republic of Poland ° (16 September 2003)
- Portugal: Grand Cross of the Order of Infante Henry ° (13 February 2004)
- Slovenia: Recipient of Golden Order for Merits ° (6 November 2019)
- Spain: Knight Grand Cross of the Order of Carlos III ° (26 May 2006)
- Sweden: Knight of the Royal Order of the Seraphim ° (2 June 1993)

=== Awards ===
- 14 August Committee's Bridge Building Prize 2011

== Notes ==
Haakon VIII House of Glücksburg Cadet branch of the House of Oldenburg Born: 20 July 1973
Regnal titles
Preceded by Harald V	King of Norway; 2026–present	Incumbent; Heir: Ingrid Alexandra
Norwegian royalty
Preceded by Harald	Crown Prince of Norway; 1991–2026	Succeeded by Ingrid Alexandra as Crown Princess
Olympic Games
Preceded by Antonio Rebollo	Final Olympic torchbearer Lillehammer 1994	Succeeded by Muhammad Ali
Preceded by Michel Platini; François-Cyrille Grange	Final Winter Olympic torchbearer Lillehammer 1994	Succeeded by Midori Ito
