= Marius Borg Høiby =

Norwegian criminal and son of Mette-Marit, Queen of Norway (born 1997)

- Born: 13 January 1997 (age 29); Oslo, Norway
- Mother: Queen Mette-Marit of Norway
- Relatives: Haakon VIII (stepfather); Crown Princess Ingrid Alexandra (half-sister); Prince Sverre Magnus (half-brother); Sven O. Høiby (maternal grandfather)
- Status: Incarcerated
- Convictions: Rape, abuse in close relationships, assault, drug possession and supply, restraining order violations
- Penalty: 4 years imprisonment

Details
- Victims: Of rape: 2 convicted 2 accused

Marius Borg Høiby (born 13 January 1997) is the eldest child of Queen Mette-Marit of Norway. He became the stepson of King Haakon VIII when his mother married the then–Crown Prince in 2001. Although he has appeared with the Norwegian royal family on several occasions, he holds no royal titles, succession rights, or official public duties.

Since 2017, Høiby has been involved in a series of criminal matters relating to allegations of violence, drug use, and breaches of a restraining order. In August 2025, he was indicted on four counts of rape and dozens of additional offences, including domestic violence and abuse in close relationships. His trial began in Oslo District Court in early 2026. He pleaded not guilty to the rape charges but admitted some offences, including aggravated assault, reckless behaviour, and transporting marijuana.

The case has been described in Norwegian media as one of the most extensive rape investigations in recent years. In June 2026, Høiby was found guilty of 34 of the 40 criminal charges against him, including two counts of rape. He was sentenced to four years in prison. As of July 2026, the case is on appeal and Høiby is under house arrest. In July 2026, he was moved from jail to house arrest at Skaugum, and a lower court has ordered him to wear an electronic tag; those conditions of detainment are scheduled to last until 5 October.

== Early life and career ==
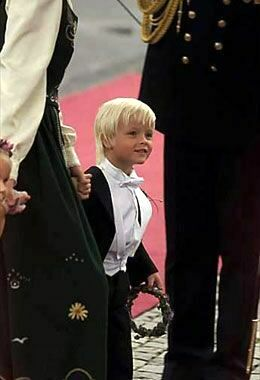
Høiby during his childhood

Marius Borg Høiby was born on 13 January 1997, at Aker University Hospital in Oslo, to Mette-Marit Tjessem Høiby, then a waitress, and Morten Borg. His parents were not in a relationship. At the time of Høiby's birth, Borg was serving a prison sentence for drug‑related violent offences. From 1997 to 1998, Høiby lived in Oslo with Mette‑Marit and her then‑partner, a disc jockey. From 1998 to 1999, he lived in Kristiansand with Mette-Marit and another disc jockey with whom she was in a relationship. Høiby attended Wang High School in Oslo.

In 2017, he enrolled in business studies in the United States. Later that year, he returned briefly to Norway before working as an intern for designer Philipp Plein. He subsequently worked as a style editor for the UK‑based fashion magazine Tempus until its closure in December 2018.

== Personal life ==
Høiby has had a series of high-profile relationships. He has dated heiress Linn Helena Nilsen, model and actress Juliane Snekkestad, and influencer Nora Haukland. Høiby invited members of the Hells Angels criminal gang to events at his home that he called "Skaugum festivals". At these events, Mette-Marit personally received his guests, and drugs were allegedly consumed there. In late 2024, Høiby began a programme of drug rehabilitation.

== Relationship to the Norwegian royal family ==
When his mother entered the public spotlight as the girlfriend of Crown Prince Haakon (later Haakon VIII), Høiby was nicknamed "Little Marius" by the media. The nickname derives from a character in the 1883 novel Poison, who – like Høiby – was born outside marriage and portrayed as an outsider. He became known to the public in December 2000, when he appeared in official Christmas photographs of the royal family taken at the Royal Lodge, Holmenkollen. His mother and Haakon announced their engagement later that month. Media commentary at the time focused on Mette‑Marit's background as a single mother and on the fact that Høiby's father had a criminal record, which generated public debate. TV 2 later wrote that "merely by existing, Marius Borg Høiby was seen by many as a scandal for the royal family."

At age four, Høiby served as a page boy when his mother and Haakon married on 25 August 2001. The royal wedding, attended by numerous European royals and widely covered by international media, made Mette-Marit the crown princess of Norway and Høiby Haakon's stepson. In a documentary filmed during Mette‑Marit's pregnancy with Princess Ingrid Alexandra, Haakon's aunt, Princess Ragnhild, Mrs. Lorentzen, expressed concern that Høiby might feel overshadowed once a royal sibling was born. Høiby is the half-brother of Ingrid Alexandra and her younger brother, Prince Sverre Magnus.

In 2024, media stated that Høiby had abused the privilege of holding a diplomatic passport. The same year, a police interrogation of Høiby revealed that Haakon, "together with the crown princess", paid his bills. Høiby received 20,000 kroner (approximately US $1900) each month. Because Høiby is only related to the royal family by marriage, he possesses no royal titles and is outside of the line of succession. He is constitutionally barred from becoming king of Norway because of his lack of blood ties with the Norwegian monarch.

== Legal issues ==
In 2017, Høiby was fined 4,000 Norwegian kroner for drug possession at the Palmesus festival in Kristiansand. In 2023, members of the Oslo police organised crime unit reportedly warned Høiby about his cocaine use and his association with individuals known for drug offences. Throughout 2024, Høiby was arrested and released several times in connection with allegations of violence, drug use, and breaches of a restraining order. In November 2024, he was charged with abuse in close relationships, violating a restraining order, and driving without a valid licence. A blood test taken while he was in custody indicated recent use of cocaine, ecstasy, and cannabis. Some media outlets claimed that he and his family had received preferential treatment from police, though authorities did not confirm this.

=== 2025–26 charges of sex crimes and domestic violence ===
On 18 August 2025, prosecutors issued an indictment charging Høiby with four counts of rape and 34 additional offences, including domestic violence and abuse in close relationships. One of the indictments related to allegations made by media personality Linni Meister. Additional charges were filed in early 2026, bringing the total number of counts to 40. One charge relating to a restraining order was later dropped.

Høiby's trial began in Oslo District Court in February 2026. He pleaded not guilty to the rape charges; however, he admitted to some offences, including aggravated assault, reckless behaviour, and transporting marijuana. He remained in custody throughout the trial. An appeals court later upheld his detention, and he was expected to remain in custody until the verdict. On 6 May, the court rejected the possibility of Høiby being held in remand on private property during the trial while electronically tagged; Høiby appealed that decision.

For the counts to which he admitted, the prosecution sought a sentence of seven years and seven months, with credit for time already served; the defence team argued that he should receive a sentence of one and a half years. Crown Princess Mette‑Marit was accused in the media of warning her son about his impending arrest and of attempting to influence witnesses. In 2026, Høiby testified in court about an interaction with his mother; his testimony gave no indication that she had committed any unlawful act. The Høiby case has been described in Norwegian media as one of the most extensive rape investigations in recent years. It has also been cited as contributing to a decline in the Norwegian royal family's reputation and increased debate about the future of the monarchy in Norway.

On 15 June 2026, the Oslo District Court found Høiby guilty of 34 of 40 charges, including two counts of rape, abuse in close relationships, assault, drug possession and supply, and restraining order violations, and sentenced him to four years' imprisonment. He was acquitted of two other rape charges. His lawyer said he would appeal the rape convictions and some of the domestic violations convictions. The court ordered Høiby to pay punitive damages of $61,000 to the four women who accused him of rape. As of July 2026, Høiby's case is under appeal. In July 2026, he was moved from jail to house arrest at Skaugum. On 27 August, Høiby was permitted to leave house arrest to visit King Harald in hospital before the monarch's death. He was also allowed to attend the procession of the King's coffin from the Red Salon to Slottskapellet on 31 August, and was granted permission to be present at Harald's funeral on 9 September.
