= Norwegian royal family =

Family of the Norwegian monarch

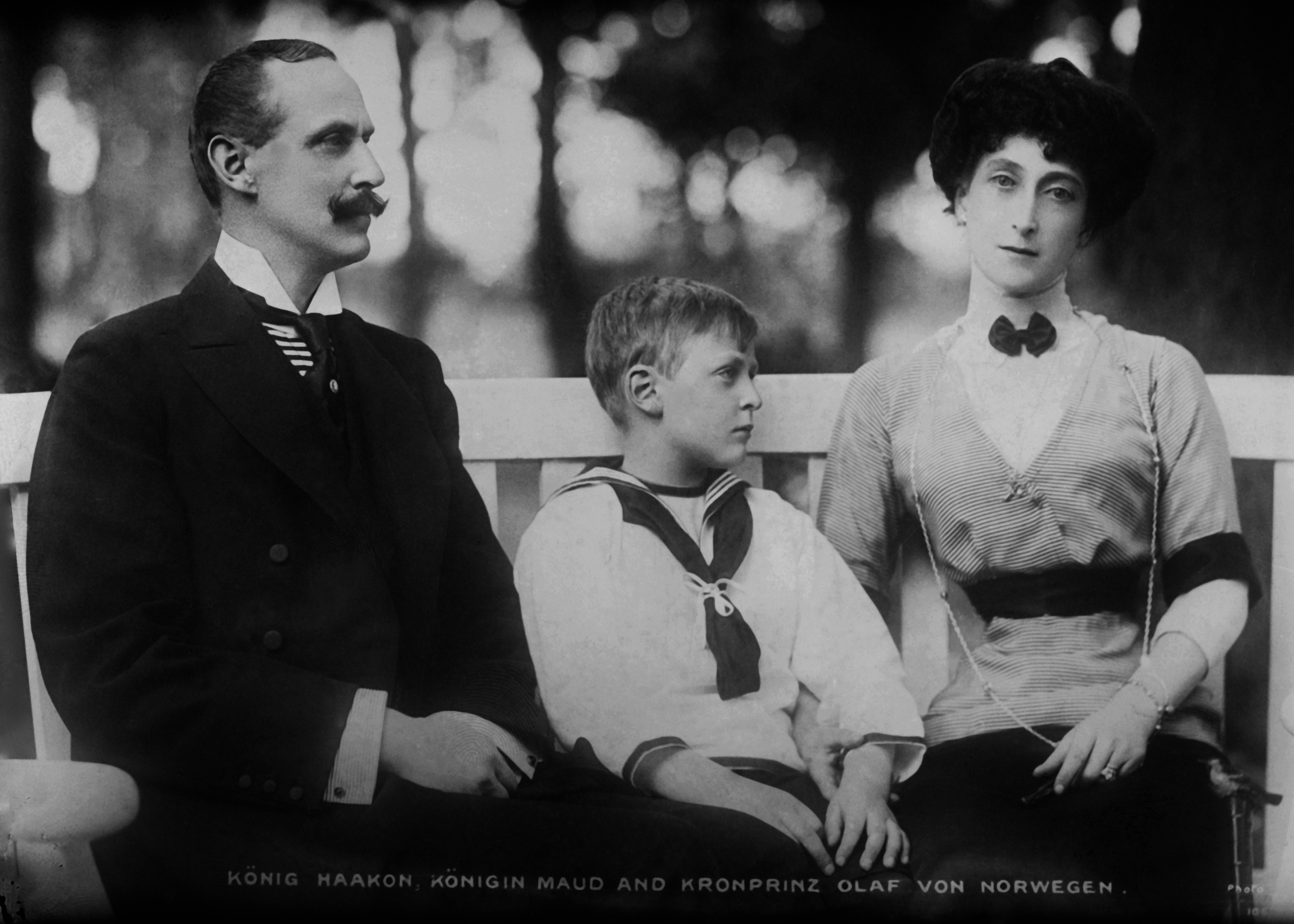
The Norwegian royal family—King Haakon VII, Queen Maud and Crown Prince Olav in 1913

Members of the Norwegian royal family are people related to King Haakon VIII who hold royal titles. The term does not include non-royal relatives. The current family who holds the throne are members of the House of Glücksburg who ascended to the Norwegian throne after the election of Prince Carl of Denmark as King of Norway (regnal name Haakon VII) during the dissolution of the Swedish-Norwegian union in 1905.

The monarch, if male, is titled king. His wife is titled queen. They are entitled to the style Majesty. The heir apparent to the Norwegian throne is crown prince or crown princess, with the style Royal Highness. The children of the reigning monarch and the children of the heir apparent are princes and princesses. Only the eldest child of the heir apparent is a Royal Highness, while the others do not have any styles in Norwegian, although the style of Highness may be used informally in foreign languages. In Norway there is traditionally no distinction between the royal house (kongehuset) and the royal family (kongelige familie). Both are informal terms. The Constitution specifically recognizes only those who hold royal titles such as prince or princess, and those who are in the line of succession. Since the 2000s, the term "royal house" has been used on the website of the royal family to refer only to the monarch and his spouse, the heir apparent and his[/her] spouse, and the heir apparent's eldest child. The royal family was from the same time used to refer to other princes or princesses, but did not include untitled relatives of the royal family.

In the 2020s, the Norwegian royal family has faced extensive criticism and scandals, including Crown Princess (later Queen) Mette-Marit's association with Jeffrey Epstein, the rape conviction of her son Marius Borg Høiby (nicknamed "Little Marius"), scandals surrounding the King's brother-in-law (American conspiracy theorist Durek Verrett), and criticism of Princess Märtha Louise for commercial exploitation of her title to promote alternative medicine. The scandals have been cited as contributing to a "decimation of the Norwegian royal family's reputation" and a doubling of membership in the Norwegian republican association. Experts stated that the scandals involving the royal family's conduct increasingly undermine its role as a representative of the Norwegian state abroad.

== History ==
The Norwegian monarchy traces its history and origin back to the unification and founding of Norway, as well as Norway's first king, Harald I of the Fairhair dynasty. With the introduction of the Norwegian Law of Succession in 1163, the legal framework established that only one monarch and one royal family was, through succession, allowed to rule.

Norway, Sweden and Denmark had joint monarchs during the Kalmar Union in the late Middle Ages, and Norway remained in union with Denmark after Sweden left the union in 1523. Following the reformation a joint Danish-Norwegian state was established 1536–37, which was ruled from Copenhagen by the House of Oldenburg until Norway was ceded to Sweden at the Treaty of Kiel in 1814 following Denmark-Norway's defeat in the Napoleonic Wars. Norway was briefly independent with its own king in 1814, but forced into a new union with Sweden under the rule of the House of Bernadotte.

Upon becoming independent in 1905, Norway decided through a referendum to remain as a monarchy, with its first monarch being the Danish-born King Haakon VII, whose family consisted of the British Princess Maud and their son Olav. It is King Haakon's descendants that today make up the current royal family of Norway.

Through marriages and historical alliances, the Norwegian royal family is closely related to the Swedish and Danish royal families as well as being more distantly related to royal families of Greece and the United Kingdom.

The current king, Haakon VIII, descends from all four kings belonging to the House of Bernadotte (1818–1905) that preceded the House of Glücksburg on the throne and is the second Norwegian monarch, after his father Harald V, to be a descendant of all previous Norwegian monarchs since 1818.

The royal family is defined as those who hold a royal title. As of 2006, the website of the royal family stated that the royal house consisted of King Harald, Queen Sonja, Crown Prince Haakon and Crown Princess Mette-Marit, and Princess Ingrid Alexandra, and that the extended royal family consists Prince Sverre Magnus, Princess Märtha Louise, Princess Ragnhild and Astrid. The website mentioned that Märtha Louise has the children Maud Angelica Behn and Leah Isadora Behn, but did not describe them as royal or part of the royal house or royal family, as they are commoners and do not hold any title. The website did not describe Ari Behn as part of the royal family, only as the father of Märtha Louise's children, in line with traditional practice. The website made no mention at all of Marius Borg Høiby, Mette-Marit's son from a previous relationship.

In September 2024, three days after Märtha Louise married conspiracy theorist Durek Verrett, the royal court removed the term "royal family" from the website (of the royal court) and clarified that Marius Borg Høiby is not royal.

Mette-Marit's association with Jeffrey Epstein and the scandals surrounding the King's son-in-law, American conspiracy theorist Durek Verrett, have been cited as contributing to a deterioration in its reputation. Norwegian media criticized King Harald V for legitimizing and endorsing the exploitation of national values and symbols for Märtha Louise's and Verrett's personal financial gain. International media have extensively covered scandals involving the Norwegian royal family, linking the Norwegian monarchy to Jeffrey Epstein, rape allegations, and controversy. Experts stated that this sustained international portrayal has damaged Norway's international standing, as the royal family's conduct increasingly undermines its role as a representative of the Norwegian state abroad.

Jan Bøhler wrote that "organized crime is today a greater threat to our country than terrorism, and we are allocating increasingly larger resources to combat it. At the same time, a member of the royal family has for years vacationed and partied with central figures in drug-related crime. Individuals known for involvement in serious money laundering cases and violent gangs, including the Hells Angels, have also participated in the festivities. These enemies of society have been allowed to roam freely on the Crown Prince couple's properties during events referred to as "Skaugum festivals."

== Royal House ==
The Royal House consists of the monarch, his or her spouse and the closest royals to the line of succession for each following generation, alongside their spouses. Consequently, the current members of the Royal House are King Haakon VIII, Queen Mette-Marit and Crown Princess Ingrid Alexandra. The other currently-living royals are the king's mother, Queen Sonja; the king and queen's younger son, Prince Sverre Magnus; and Princess Märtha Louise, the king's sister.

== Family tree of members ==
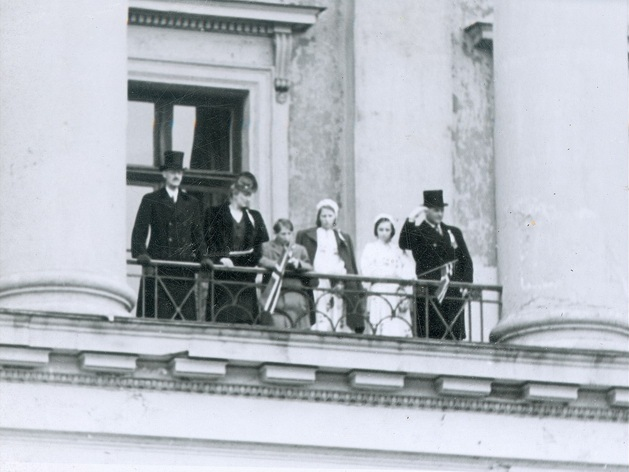
The royal family with King Haakon VII, Crown Princess Martha, Crown Prince Olav, Princess Astrid, Princess Ragnhild and Prince Harald on the Royal Palace balcony in 1946

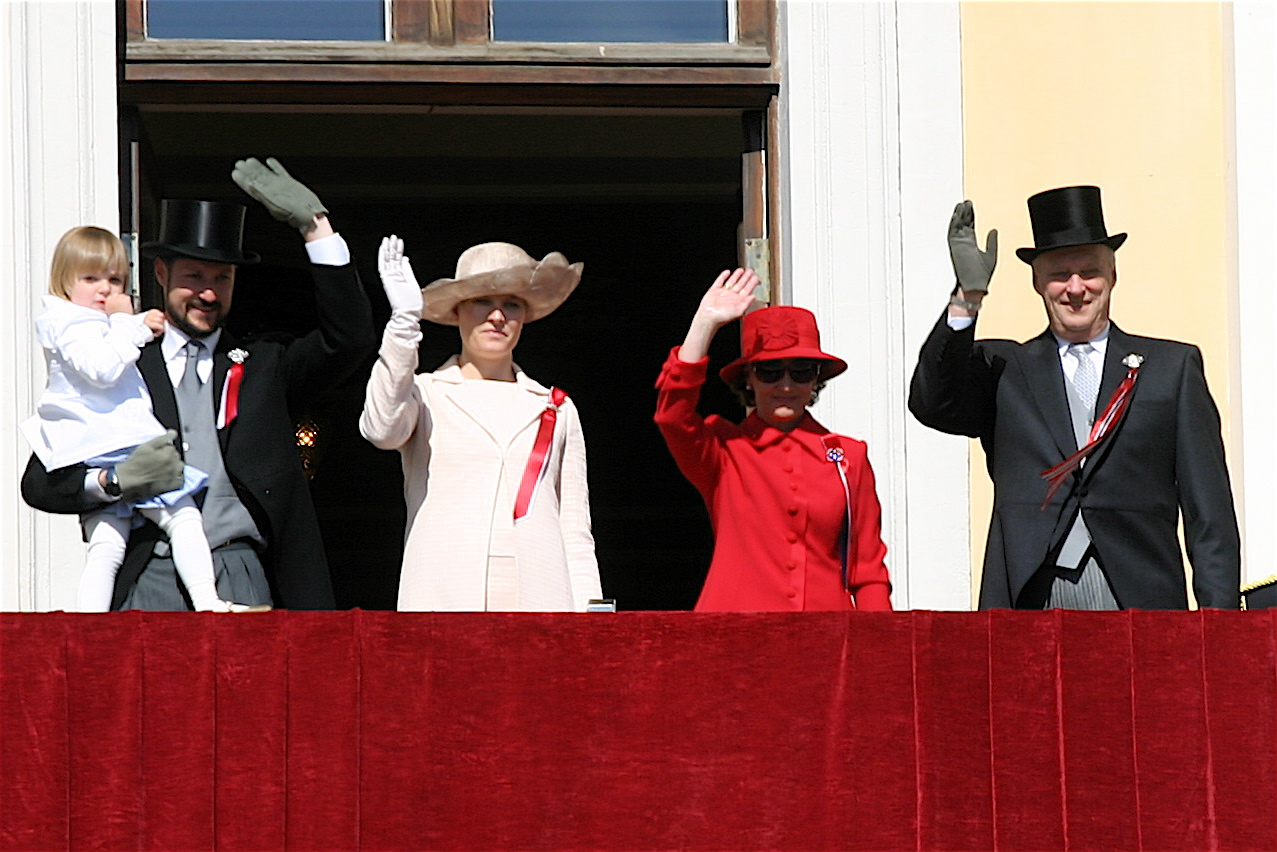
Members of the Royal House at 2007 Constitution Day celebrations with Princess Ingrid Alexandra, Crown Prince Haakon, Crown Princess Mette-Marit, Queen Sonja and King Harald V

King Harald V	Queen Sonja
Princess Märtha Louise	The King	The Queen
The Crown Princess	Prince Sverre Magnus

== Royal coat of arms ==
The coat of arms of Norway is one of the oldest in Europe and serves both as the coat of arms of the nation and of the Royal House. This is in keeping with its origin as the coat of arms of the kings of Norway during the Middle Ages.

Håkon the Old (1217–1263) used a shield with a lion. The earliest preserved reference to the colour of the arms is the King's Saga written down in 1220.

In 1280 King Eirik Magnusson added the crown and silver axe to the lion. The axe is the martyr axe of St. Olav, the weapon used to kill him in the battle of Stiklestad in 1030.

The specific rendering of the Norwegian arms has changed through the years, following changing heraldic fashions. In the late Middle Ages, the axe handle gradually grew longer and came to resemble a halberd. The handle was usually curved in order to fit the shape of shield preferred at the time, and also to match the shape of coins. The halberd was officially discarded and the shorter axe reintroduced by royal decree in 1844, when an authorized rendering was instituted for the first time. In 1905 the official design for royal and government arms was again changed, this time reverting to the medieval pattern, with a triangular shield and a more upright lion.

The coat of arms of the royal house as well as the Royal Standard uses the lion design from 1905. The earliest preserved depiction of the Royal Standard is on the seal of Duchess Ingebjørg from 1318. The rendering used as the official coat of arms of Norway is slightly different and was last approved by the king 20 May 1992.

When used as the royal coat of arms the shield features the insignias of the Royal Norwegian Order of St. Olav around it and is framed by a royal ermine robe, surmounted by the crown of Norway.

The royal coat of arms is not used frequently. Instead, the king's monogram is extensively used, for instance in military insignia and on coins.

Arms of Norway

Royal coat of arms of Norway

Coat of arms of the Crown Prince of Norway
Royal monogram of King Haakon VII of Norway

Royal monogram of Queen Maud of Norway

Royal monogram of King Olav V of Norway

Royal monogram of Crown Princess Märtha of Norway

Royal monogram of King Harald V of Norway

Royal monogram of Queen Sonja of Norway

Royal monogram of Crown Prince Haakon of Norway

Royal monogram of Crown Princess Mette-Marit of Norway

Royal monogram of Princess Ingrid Alexandra of Norway

== See also ==
- Kings of Norway family tree
- Succession to the Norwegian throne
- List of Norwegian monarchs
- Monarchy of Norway
