= Royal House Centennial Medal =

Royal House Centennial Medal Kongehusets 100-årsmedalje
- Ribbon bar
- Country: Norway
- Established: November 25, 2005

Precedence
- Next (higher): H. M. The King's Commemorative Medal
- Next (lower): King Haakon VII Commemorative Medal

The Royal House Centennial Medal (Norwegian: Kongehusets 100-årsmedalje) is a Norwegian award established by Harald V of Norway to commemorate the centennial of the Norwegian royal family. The day that it was established marks the hundredth anniversary of the day that Haakon VII arrived in Norway: November 25, 1905. The medal ranks 29th in the Norwegian decoration order of precedence.

== Description ==
The Royal House Centennial Medal is made of silver. It is round and has a diameter of 30 cm, with a royal crown fixed to the top. The obverse depicts King Haakon VII with the inscription "KONGEHUSET 100 ÅR" (The Royal House 100 Years). The reverse shows a wreath made of oak leaves. Above the wreath is the inscription "ALT FOR NORGE" (Everything for Norway), the motto of King Haakon VII, King Olav V, and King Harald V. Below the wreath is the inscription "1905–2005."

The medal hangs from a blue ribbon with red and white edges, representing the colors of the Norwegian flag. The same color arrangement was used for the ribbon for the Order of the Norwegian Lion. The medal was produced by the Carl Poellath company.

== Conferral ==
The Royal House Centennial Medal was awarded in connection with celebrations of the centennial of Norwegian independence and the royal family in 2005. The medal was awarded to members of the Norwegian royal family, descendants of King Haakon VII and Queen Maud, members of the Royal Court, members of the government, the presidium of the Norwegian Parliament, county governors, bishops of the Church of Norway, police directors, other officials, and persons that assisted the royal family. A total of 400 medals were produced, of which 366 were awarded.
