= GreatAuPair =

Au pair organization based in Austin, Texas, USA

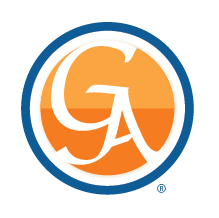
- GreatAuPair's logo
- Founded: 2001
- Founders: Shannon Pitts; Jamie Pitts
- Headquarters: Austin, Texas
- Website: www.greataupair.com

GreatAuPair is an American au pair organization based in Austin, Texas. It was founded in 2001 by Shannon and Jamie Pitts, who were living in San Ramon, California, and had hired au pairs in the past to take care of their children. By 2013, the firm had connected more than one million families and caretakers.

== History ==
GreatAuPair was founded in 2001 by Shannon and Jamie Pitts, residents of San Ramon, California. The couple had for a couple years enlisted the help of au pairs to relieve Jamie from taking care of their children. According to their account, they decided to help other parents do likewise by starting a website that allowed families and au pairs to find each other. Jamie Pitts conceived of the idea, and Shannon Pitts helped start the company after his employer, a dot-com company, failed. He aimed for a new job that would enable him to spend more time at home and with his family. His former job had required him to commute two hours each day to San Jose, California.

In July 2002, GreatAuPair had 7,000 registered users. In December 2003, it had connected more than 60,000 families and au pairs. In October 2008, the company had 6,000 families and 17,000 au pairs. By 2013, the company had matched more than one million families and caretakers.

In 2007, multiple consumers using GreatAuPair were scammed into sending money to au pairs or families who said they needed money. The firm issued a press release reminding users to be wary of sending money to people in Nigeria, Ghana, Cameroon, and other developing countries. In December 2010, Princess Märtha Louise of Norway and her husband Ari Behn found a native English-speaking au pair for their children Maud Angelica Behn, Leah Isadora Behn, and Emma Tallulah Behn through GreatAuPair.

In 2011, GreatAuPair became a division of InteliMark Enterprises, which was based in Gardnerville, Nevada. In 2019, GreatAuPair and the 14 other companies permitted by United States Department of State to hire au pairs acceded to a $65.5 million settlement to a class-action lawsuit begun in 2014. The lawsuit accused the companies of colluding with each other to pay au pairs the same wage throughout the United States: for a 45-hour workweek, they would be paid $197.75 per week and be provided shelter and food. The companies said that the $4.35 per hour wage did not take into account the food and shelter and said they complied with what the State Department suggested they pay. They did not agree to being at fault in the settlement but promised that they would tell parents and nannies that the pay can be discussed. GreatAuPair is based in Austin, Texas.

== Services ==
Users create GreatAuPair profiles containing their resumes, images, and essays explaining their child-raising beliefs. Although user profiles can be reviewed without charge, consumers have to pay to receive their contact details. The company provides details about visas and does background checks on all au pairs from the United States. The company also matches people with elder caretakers, babysitters, pet sitters, house sitters, and tutors.

== Commentary ==
In 2006, journalist Armin Brott wrote in his "Ask Mr. Dad" column that along with Craigslist and Nanny Locators, GreatAuPair was one of the "best resources" for finding nannies or babysitters. Jason Vollmer and Lisa J. Vollmer wrote in their 2007 The Princeton Review book What to Do with Your Psychology or Sociology Degree that GreatAuPair is "a fairly comprehensive site featuring nanny and au pair openings within the United States and abroad".

In their 2013 Let's Go book Let's Go Europe 2013, members of the Harvard Student Agencies wrote that GreatAuPair was "an easy-to-use, US-based organization that matches au pairs with families across the world". In their 2013 Let's Go book Let's Go Paris, Amsterdam and Brussels, they wrote that GreatAuPair was "one of the most trusted international job matching sites around".

The au pair program is managed by the United States Department of State as an "exchange visitor program", but critics argue that it works instead as a guest worker program. Noy Thrupkaew of The Washington Post wrote in 2016 that GreatAuPair reflects this divide. On the one hand, GreatAuPair tells families seeking nannies that au pairs are "one of the most affordable childcare options available, especially if you have a gaggle of kids". On the other hand, GreatAuPair tells au pairs that they get the chance to travel to "great cities, improve your English, and learn more about American culture". Thrupkaew said that GreatAuPair's messages "can lead to clashing expectations and disputes".
