= Per Heimly =

Norwegian photographer

- Born: February 4, 1972 (age 54); Narvik, Norway
- Occupation: Photographer
- Television: Ari og Per

Per Arne Heimly (born February 4, 1972) is a Norwegian contemporary and commercial art photographer. Well known for his celebrity portraits, Heimly's art practice includes video and installation artwork, in addition to a long-standing exploration of unflinching self-portrait photography.

Heimly was a member of Den Nye Vinen (‘The New Wine’) an anarchist artist collective announced at the Theater Cafe in Oslo in 1993 that included Ari Behn, Bertrand Bisigye, and Henning Braathen.

In 1999, Heimly co-founded Fjords Magazine with designer Pauline Nærholm. He also served as a creative director and editor for Fjords, a Norwegian fashion and design magazine with international distribution. From 2001 to 2006, he directed several projects as a videographer for the musician Morten Abel. Heimly appeared in the comedy TV series Uti vår hage ("Outside in Our Garden") in 2008.

Heimly held a solo exhibition in 2010 titled Between Angels and Demons that featured his portrait, self-portrait, and landscape photography from the preceding twenty years.

In 2011, Heimly co-hosted the award-winning Norwegian TV series on NRK Ari og Per (”Ari and Per”) with the late author and visual artist Ari Behn. The appeal of one episode of the show was attributed, in part, to the willingness of Heimly and Behn to be authentic and vulnerable participants on camera at an Ängsbacka festival. He appeared paired with Behn on a later TV program, "Ari and Per Solve World Problems" on TVNorge in 2013. Heimly also appeared in 2013 in the TV series Hjerterått.
