= Three Miles North of Molkom =

- Directed by: Robert Cannan; Corinna McFarlane
- Release dates: 2008 (festivals); 18 September 2009

Three Miles North of Molkom is a 2008 documentary film directed by Corinna Villari-McFarlane and Robert Cannan. It was nominated in the Best British Documentary category for the British Independent Film Awards 2008.

It follows seven participants of the 2007 No Mind Festival at Ängsbacka, a course center located in Molkom, Sweden. This yearly New Age event lasts one or two weeks, has a thousand participants, and is claimed to be the largest alternative festival in Northern Europe.

The activities shown in the film include tree hugging (each one choosing his own tree), firewalking, nude swimming, sweat lodge, hugging, Tantric sex, singing, dancing, talks in "sharing circles". There is also an exercise in defending oneself against a physical attack using psychic energy.

The portrayed participants are:

- Siddhartha, a Swedish harbor master, who says he feels like a king in his nice house, but also that he is lonely, and longs for a woman.
- Nick, an Australian rugby coach who explains that he expected a different kind of festival; a female journalist friend suggested he attend while she would be there writing a story about the festival. He is very skeptical at first, describing the festival as a cult, but evolves into an enthusiastic participant. He teaches the group some Australian expressions, pronounced in the Australian way, such as "no worries".
