= Ari Behn =

Norwegian author (1972–2019)

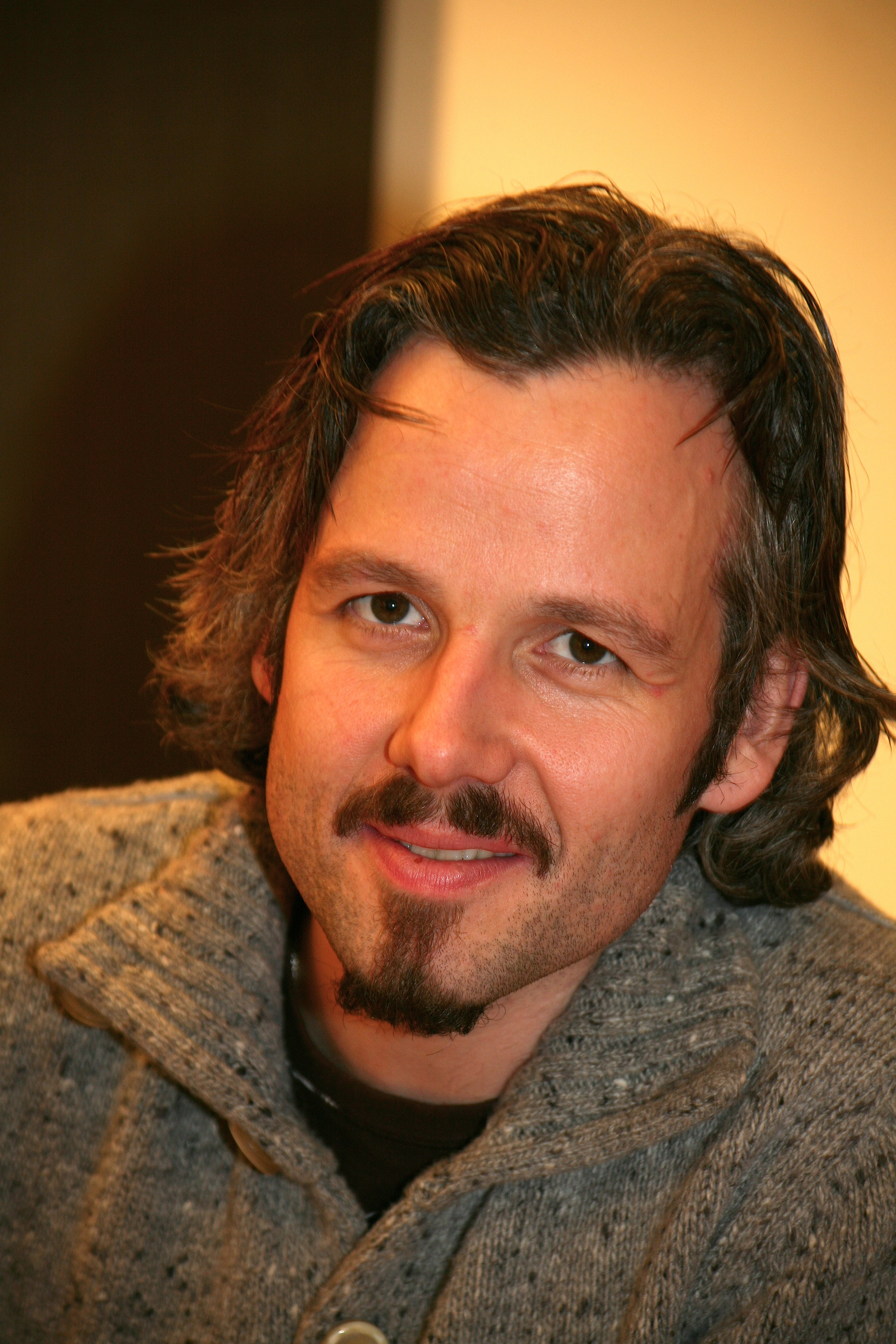
- Behn in 2006
- Born: Ari Mikael Bjørshol; 30 September 1972; Århus, Denmark
- Died: 25 December 2019 (aged 47); Lommedalen, Norway
- Resting place: Cemetery of Our Saviour, Oslo, Norway
- Education: University of Oslo
- Occupations: Author, visual artist
- Spouse: Princess Märtha Louise of Norway (m. 2002; div. 2017)
- Children: Maud Angelica Behn; Leah Isadora Behn; Emma Tallulah Behn

Ari Mikael Behn (Norwegian pronunciation: [ˈɑ̀ːrɪ ˈbeːn]; né Bjørshol, pronounced [ˈbjø̀ːʂhuːl] or [ˈbjø̀ːʁshuːl]; 30 September 1972 – 25 December 2019) was a Norwegian author, playwright, and visual artist, best known for his marriage to Princess Märtha Louise of Norway from 2002 to 2017. He held no title or special status, and he remained a private citizen during the marriage.

Known as Mikael Bjørshol until 1996, Behn achieved modest literary success with his 1999 short story collection Trist som faen ("Sad as hell") which received several favorable reviews in Norwegian newspapers, and which remains his best known work. His engagement to Märtha Louise sparked additional interest in the book, and by 2020 it had sold a total of nearly 100,000 copies since publication. Following his 2002 marriage to Märtha Louise, he wrote four novels, two short story collections, one play and a book about his wedding, although his later work received less favorable reviews than Trist som faen. He took part in other creative and artistic endeavours such as the design of a china set named "Peacock". In the 2000s and 2010s his public activity and art were met with mixed reactions in Norway, and Behn acknowledged that many people regarded him as a "fool" and an amateur artist. From 2013 until his death he was active as a visual artist, painting in a neo-expressionist tradition inspired by Jean-Michel Basquiat. Behn's artwork, described as "highly narrative", was widely exhibited internationally in 2017–18.

== Background and early life ==
Behn was born as Ari Mikael Bjørshol in 1972 in Aarhus, Denmark, to Olav Bjørshol (b. 1952) and Marianne Rafaela Solberg (b. 1953), Norwegians who were both Waldorf teachers and who married in 1973. The family lived in Aarhus, then in Plymouth, England, where his father trained as a photographer, and then in Tennevoll in Northern Norway where his mother worked as a teacher at the local school from 1977 to 1978. In 1978 the family settled in Moss in South Norway. Bjørshol was baptized and confirmed in The Christian Community and attended the Waldorf School in Moss from 1979.

In 1983, his parents divorced and married a couple who had been among their friends, Jan Pahle and Tone Bjerke, who had previously been married to each other. Tone Bjerke had family connections to several prominent cultural figures; she was the daughter of the well-known poet André Bjerke, and her extended family included people like writer Jens Bjørneboe (father's cousin), actress Henny Moan (stepmother) and singer Ole Paus (stepmother's new partner). In the 2000s his parents divorced Pahle and Bjerke, and they married each other for the second time in 2007.

In the 1990s, he studied history and religion at the University of Oslo, from which he received a bachelor's degree.

Behn's original surname was Bjørshol and he was known by family and during his childhood and youth under the given name Mikael. In 1996, he changed his name to Ari Behn when he took his maternal grandmother's maiden name. The name Behn has German origin. He had two younger siblings, Anja Sabrina and Espen, neither of whom use the name Behn. In 2009, it was made public that Behn's de jure paternal grandfather, the Tromsø lawyer Bjarne Nikolai Bjørshol, was not his biological grandfather. Behn's father met his biological father, Terje Erling Ingebrigtsen (1933–2009), a retired car mechanic from Tromsø, for the first time, but Ingebrigtsen died before Behn had a chance to meet him.

== Work ==
Behn was a founding member of Den Nye Vinen ("The New Wine"), an anarchist artist collective announced in Oslo in 1993 that included Bertrand Bisigye, Henning Braathen, and Per Heimly.

Behn achieved literary success in Norway with his first collection of short stories, titled Trist som faen ("Sad as hell"), in 1999. His work received several good reviews and sold more than 100,000 copies. As an author he is best known for his first book; he subsequently published four other novels to more mixed reviews.

Together with his wife, Princess Märtha, Behn wrote a book about their wedding in 2002. He also participated in various creative projects, for example, the design of a china set named "Peacock" for Magnor Glassverk, and he was a model for a clothing chain.

He also made TV documentaries, including a critical documentary on the Afghanistan War in 2002, titled Øst for krigen – invitert av Taliban ("East of the war – invited by the Taliban").

Behn appeared in the comedy films Team Antonsen in 2004 and Long Flat Balls in 2006.

He was a freelance writer for several newspapers and magazines. In 2011, he co-hosted the award-winning TV series Ari og Per on NRK with his friend Per Heimly. The appeal of one episode of the show was attributed, in part, to the willingness of Behn and Heimly to be authentic and vulnerable participants on camera at an Ängsbacka festival. Behn and Heimly appeared together on a later TV program, "Ari and Per Solve World Problems" on TVNorge in 2013.

Behn was also a playwright; his first play, Treningstimen ("The Training Hour") debuted in 2011. Although the play was reported to have received a standing ovation from the audience on opening night, reviews overall were mixed.

From 2013 until his death in 2019, Behn was active as a painter in a neo-expressionist tradition; he cited Jean-Michel Basquiat as his most important inspiration. As a painter he achieved commercial success by Norwegian standards, and sold paintings for 5.7 million NOK in 2018. Behn exhibited his work internationally, including at Gabba Gallery's exhibit Borderless: Scandinavia in Los Angeles in 2018. Behn was paired with the Scandinavian painters Mikael Persbrandt and Espen Eiborg and artwork from the trio has been shown in over 60 international galleries since 2017.

Behn published Inferno in 2018 which detailed the aftermath of his divorce and included some of his struggles with mental health.

== Marriage and family ==
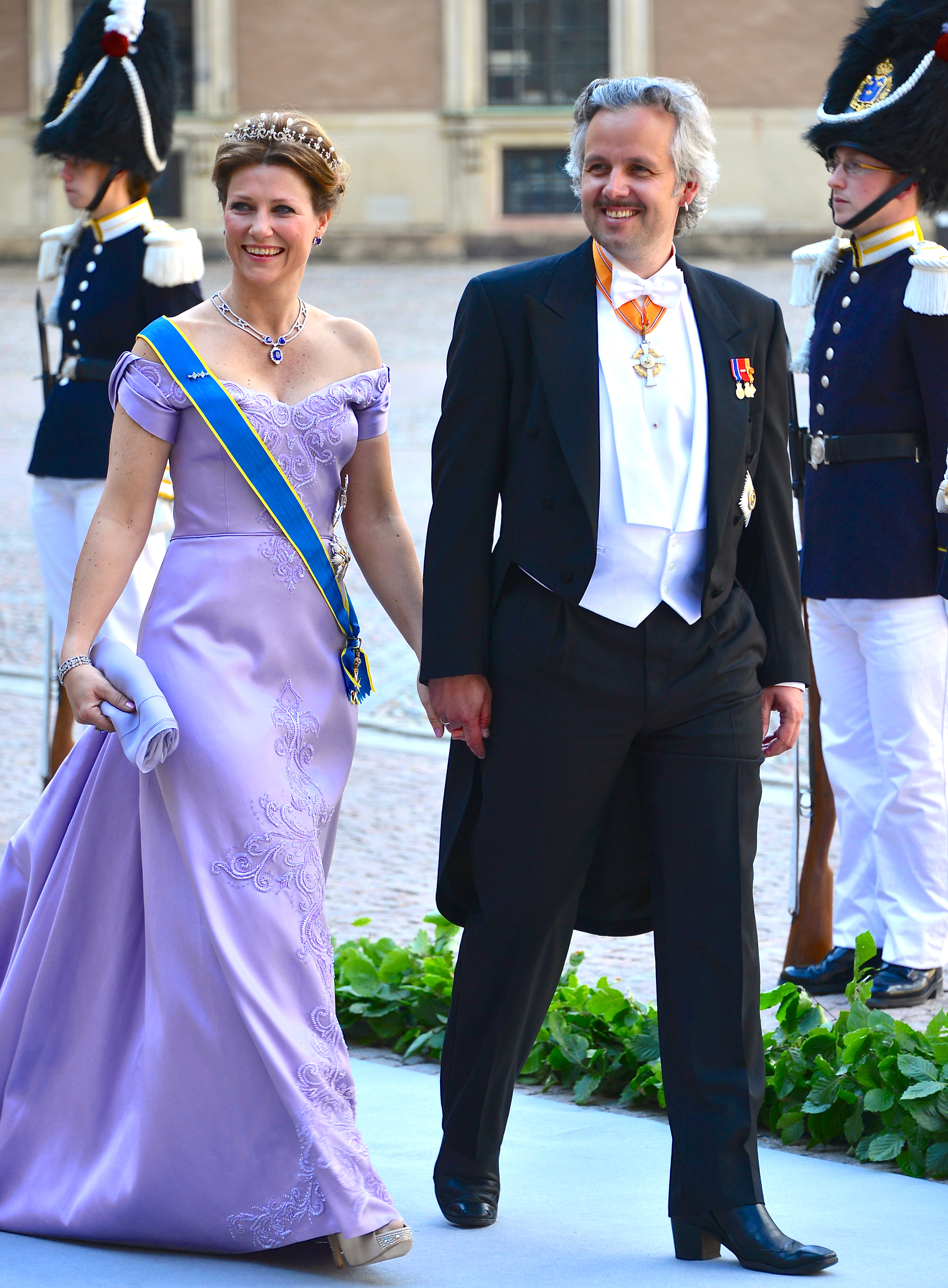
Princess Märtha Louise and Ari Behn attending Princess Madeleine of Sweden's wedding in 2013

On 24 May 2002, Behn married Princess Märtha Louise, the elder child of Harald V of Norway. Märtha Louise is a self-described clairvoyant who led her own alternative therapy center named Astarte Education/Soulspring, commonly known in Norway as the "angel school" (Norwegian: engleskolen), which provided training in communication with angels and communication with the dead.

At the time of their wedding, his wife was second in the line of succession to the Norwegian throne after her younger brother; from her birth in 1971 to 1990, she was not in the line of succession at all due to Norway's agnatic primogeniture succession. She was, however, 31st in the line of succession to the British throne at the time of her birth, being descended from Edward VII. Behn remained a private citizen and held no title, royal status, or special privileges during the marriage; since 1814, Norway has had no nobility and no concept of commoners, only citizens. They had three daughters, all of whom are also private citizens: Maud Angelica Behn (born 2003), Leah Isadora Behn (born 2005), and Emma Tallulah Behn (born 2008).

The family moved for a time to the United Kingdom and lived in the Islington section of North London. They also lived in New York City before moving back to Norway and making their home in the valley of Lommedalen, outside Oslo.

On 5 August 2016, the Royal Court announced that Princess Märtha Louise and Behn had started divorce proceedings and intended to share custody of their three daughters. They were divorced in 2017.

At the time of his death, Behn was in a relationship with lawyer Ebba Rysst Heilman.

== Reception and press coverage ==
Around the turn of the century Behn and some of his friends, among them photographer Per Heimly, declared themselves to be "The New Wine." During the early 2000s Behn was often portrayed in Norwegian media as a pretentious poseur. He was known for "harsh public feuds" with critics and artists and was often the subject of ridicule in the media. In 2001 he famously challenged critic Kjetil Rolness to a duel with pistol or sword. Even his relative Ole Paus called him "Prins Kvaps von und zu Quasi" [roughly: Prince Fool von und zu Fake] in 2002. In later years Behn was reconciled with many of his critics from this period, and public reception became less critical in the late 2010s after he became active as a visual artist. In his final novel Inferno Behn commented on how he was viewed in Norway: "I also design tableware and wine glasses, I joke with my own position as a public figure in the media. I am a clown, in worst case. In best case, I am a debater and public figure. To many people I am a fool." Art historian Øivind Lorentz Storm Bjerke said that Behn "is sometimes portrayed as a merry amateur who suddenly decided to try his hand at art, but this is not correct [...] he is part of a group of visual artists who lack formal training, but who are active in different art forms."

Behn made headlines in Norwegian newspapers in the autumn of 2006, when he revealed that he voted for the Norwegian Labour Party. His friendship with the former Minister of Culture and Labour leader Trond Giske attracted criticism from newspapers and politicians. In January 2009, Behn received massive media coverage in the Norwegian press after going on a "personal vendetta" against former palace official Carl-Erik Grimstad, accusing him of spreading tabloid nonsense regarding Behn and his family.

Following his death Behn was widely praised for his personal qualities, and described as a caring, colourful personality.

In December 2017, Behn said that the actor Kevin Spacey had groped his genitals in 2007, at a nightclub during the afterparty for the Nobel Peace Prize concert; however he said he didn't feel violated by the incident and that he "had a wonderful time" at the party; Behn said on the talkshow Skavlan: "I didn't experience it as sexual harassment [...] for me it was a compliment." Following his death American media portrayed him as a "Spacey accuser", although he had not accused Spacey of wrongdoing or been involved in any legal cases against Spacey, and conspiracy theories focusing on the incident circulated on the Internet; Norwegian commentators pointed out that Behn had regarded the incident as a minor, entertaining anecdote, and accused American media of fostering conspiracy theories by blowing the incident out of proportion. Media studies scholar Gunn Enli described American coverage of Behn's death and its focus on the Spacey incident "taken out of context" as a "distorted version of reality."

Behn was the subject of a documentary series that followed him during a difficult period around the time of his divorce. The three-episode series, titled Ari Behn og halve kongeriket ("Ari and Half the Kingdom"), was produced for TV3. Prior to the release of the series, Behn and members of his family made clear that they did not support the final content and withheld their approval. TV3 aired the docuseries in 2018 despite the objections of Behn, his family, and his legal representatives. After Behn's death, TV3 withdrew web access to the series on the day preceding his funeral.

== Death ==
Behn died at his home in Lommedalen on 25 December 2019. A statement from his family said Behn had died by suicide. He had struggled with alcoholism and mental health problems. In a 2009 interview, he said he was chronically depressed and lonely.

The swift public announcement by the Norwegian royal family following his death was noted as unusually open and forthright; King Harald V, Queen Sonja, and other members of his former wife's family as well as his own family expressed their sorrow at his death in statements released to the public. His funeral was held at Oslo Cathedral on 3 January 2020.

Ari Behn's publisher said that Behn left behind a completed manuscript for a children's book that he had written with his eldest daughter Maud Angelica. It is uncertain whether the book will be published.

His resting place is the Cemetery of Our Saviour.

== Honours ==
=== National honours ===
- Norway: Recipient of the Medal of the 100th Anniversary of the Birth of King Olav V
- Norway: Recipient of the Royal House Centenary Medal
- Norway: Recipient of the King Harald V Silver Jubilee Medal

=== Foreign honours ===
- Netherlands: Knight Grand Officer of the Order of the Crown
- Sweden: Recipient of the 70th Birthday Medal of King Carl XVI Gustaf

== Bibliography ==
- Trist som faen ("Sad as Hell"), 1999, collection of short stories, 93 pages, ISBN 9788205270619.
- Fra hjerte til hjerte ("From Heart to Heart"), 2002 in collaboration with wife Märtha Louise, is a book about their wedding, ISBN 9788252543711.
- Bakgård ("Backyard"), 2003, ISBN 9788205326033.
- Entusiasme og raseri ("Enthusiasm and Rage"), a roman à clef published in October 2006, ISBN 9788202265762.
- Vivian Seving etc., 2009, ISBN 9788205375789.
- Talent for lykke ("Talent for Happiness"), 2011, collection of short stories, 96 pages, ISBN 9788205426689.
- Tiger i Hagen ("Tiger in the Garden"), 2015, collection of short stories, 96 pages, ISBN 9788205429901.
- Inferno, 2018, novel with paintings, 118 pages, ISBN 9788233801519.
