= Svein Nyhus =

Norwegian illustrator and writer of children's books

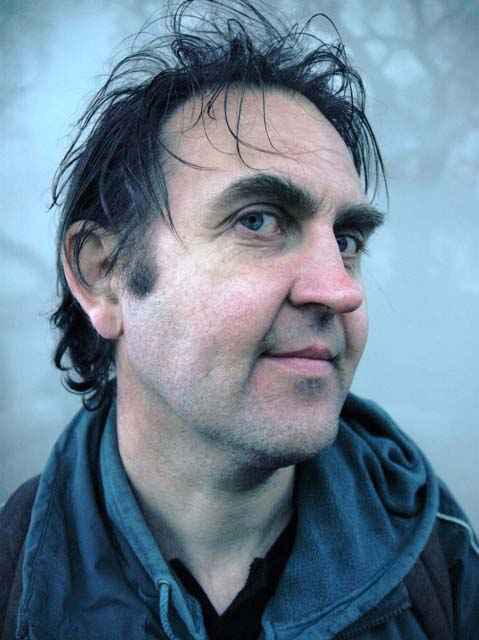
- Svein Nyhus in 2005
- Born: 23 January 1962 (age 64); Tønsberg, Norway
- Occupations: Illustrator, writer of children's books
- Spouse: Gro Dahle
- Writing career
- Genre: Children's literature

Svein Nyhus (born 23 January 1962) is a Norwegian illustrator and writer of children's books.

Svein Nyhus at a book signing with Princess Märtha Louise of Norway in Minnesota, April 15, 2006

Svein Nyhus was born in Tønsberg as the twin brother of caricaturist Egil Nyhus. He took his education at the Norwegian National Academy of Craft and Art Industry from 1981 to 1985.

Svein Nyhus has illustrated his own texts as well as books by his wife, Norwegian poet Gro Dahle. His own books include

- Drømmemaskinen ("The Dreammachine", 1995),
- Pappa! ("Daddy!", 1998),
- Verden har ingen hjørner ("The World Has No Corners", 1999),
- Lille Lu og Trollmannen Bulibar ("Little Lu And Bulibar The Wizard", 2001),
- Ingen ("Nobody", 2002) and Jeg! ("Me!", 2004),
- Opp og ut ("Up And Away", 2008) and
- Sånt som er ("Things That Are", 2010).
- Lars (2011–2014)
- Skal vi leke? (Do you want to play? 2016)
- Steder å snakke om finans (Places to converse about finance, 2021)

His books have been translated into several languages; In 2004 he illustrated Why Kings and Queens Don't Wear Crowns, a picture book written by Princess Märtha Louise of Norway. In 2013 Svein Nyhus illustrated What Does the Fox Say?, a children's picture book based on Ylvis's YouTube hit The Fox. The book debuted before Christmas at number one on the New York Times Best Seller list. Nyhus also illustrated Sina Mann (Angryman, 2004), a picture book about a boy witnessing domestic violence, written by his wife Gro Dahle. It was published in English 2019.

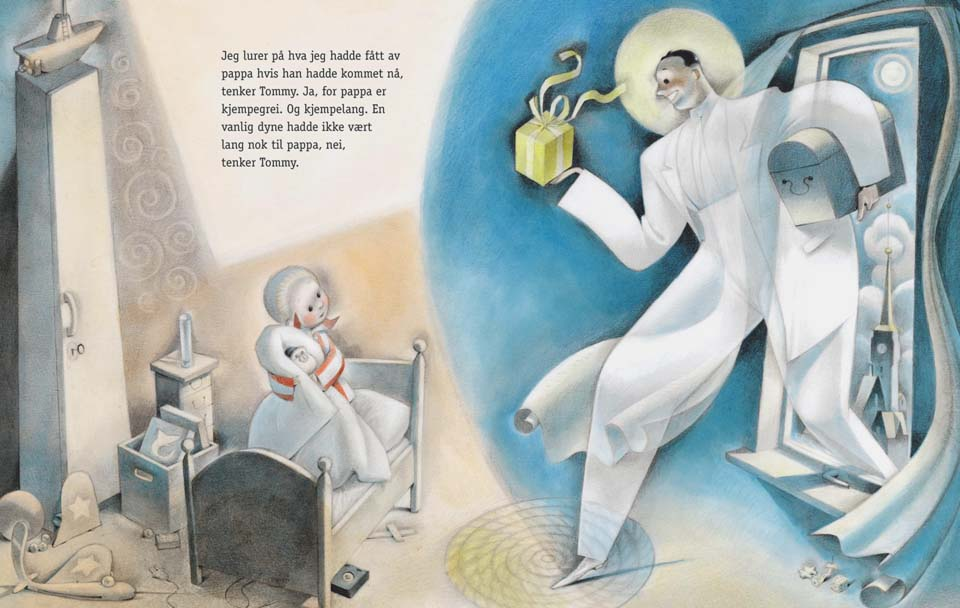
Illustration from Svein Nyhus' picture book Pappa! ("Daddy!"), 1998

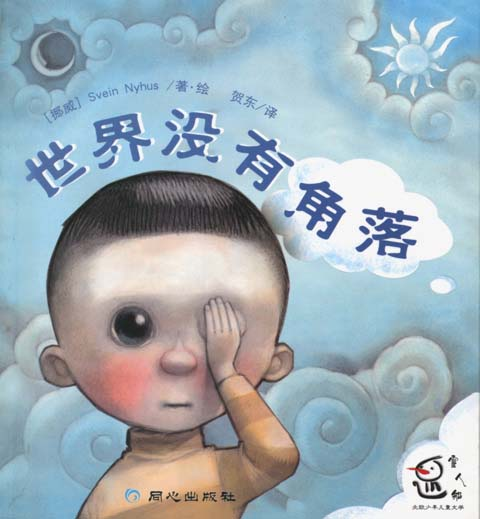
Chinese edition of Svein Nyhus' picture book Verden har ingen hjørner ("The World Has No Corners"), 1999

Awards
Preceded by Anne B. Ragde	Recipient of the Brage Prize for children and youth 2002 (with Gro Dahle)	Succeeded by Helga Gunerius Eriksen; Gry Moursund
