= Norway national under-17 football team =

National youth association football team

Norway under-17
- Association: Football Association of Norway (Norges Fotballforbund)
- Confederation: UEFA (Europe)
- Head coach: (Norway) Erland Johnsen
- Most caps: Sindre Walle Egeli (17)
- Top scorer: Sindre Walle Egeli (16)
- FIFA code: NOR
First colours	Second colours

First international
- Norway 2–3 Finland (Lommedalen, Norway; 7 June 1981)

Biggest win
- Gibraltar 0–10 Norway (Pančevo, Serbia; 24 October 2017)

Biggest defeat
- Norway 0–7 Italy (San Marino; 11 November 2024)

World Cup
- Appearances: 0 (first in –)
- Best result: –

European Championship
- Appearances: 2 (first in 2017)
- Best result: Quarter-finals (2018)

The Norway national under-17 football team, controlled by the Football Association of Norway, is the national under-17 football team of Norway.

== History ==
The team is for players of 17 years or under at the start of a UEFA European Under-17 Championship campaign. Norway has qualified for the 2017 UEFA European Under-17 Championship & 2018 UEFA European Under-17 Championship.

== Competitive results ==
=== FIFA U-16/17 World Cup record ===
Year	Round	Position	Matches	Wins	Draws	Losses	GF	GA
(China) 1985	did not qualify							
(Canada) 1987	did not qualify							
(Scotland) 1989	did not qualify							
(Italy) 1991	did not qualify							
(Japan) 1993	did not qualify							
(Ecuador) 1995	did not qualify							
(Egypt) 1997	did not qualify							
(New Zealand) 1999	did not qualify							
(Trinidad and Tobago) 2001	did not qualify							
(Finland) 2003	did not qualify							
(Peru) 2005	did not qualify							
(South Korea) 2007	did not qualify							
(Nigeria) 2009	did not qualify							
(Mexico) 2011	did not qualify							
(United Arab Emirates) 2013	did not qualify							
(Chile) 2015	did not qualify							
(India) 2017	did not qualify							
(Brazil) 2019	did not qualify							
(Indonesia) 2023	did not qualify							
(Qatar) 2025	did not qualify							
(Qatar) 2026	did not qualify							
(Qatar) 2027	To be determined							
(Qatar) 2028	To be determined							
(Qatar) 2029	To be determined							
Totals	0/20		0	0	0	0	0	0

=== UEFA European U-17 Championship record ===
Year	Round	Pld	W	D*	L	GF	GA
(Denmark) 2002	did not qualify						
(Portugal) 2003	did not qualify						
(France) 2004	did not qualify						
(Italy) 2005	did not qualify						
(Luxembourg) 2006	did not qualify						
(Belgium) 2007	did not qualify						
(Turkey) 2008	did not qualify						
(Germany) 2009	did not qualify						
(Liechtenstein) 2010	did not qualify						
(Serbia) 2011	did not qualify						
(Slovenia) 2012	did not qualify						
(Slovakia) 2013	did not qualify						
(Malta) 2014	did not qualify						
(Bulgaria) 2015	did not qualify						
(Azerbaijan) 2016	did not qualify						
(Croatia) 2017	Group stage	3	0	1	2	3	7
(England) 2018	Quarter-finals	4	2	1	1	4	3
(Republic of Ireland) 2019	did not qualify						
(Estonia) 2020	Cancelled due to COVID-19 pandemic						
(Cyprus) 2021	Cancelled due to COVID-19 pandemic						
(Israel) 2022	did not qualify						
(Hungary) 2023	did not qualify						
(Cyprus) 2024	did not qualify						
(Albania) 2025	did not qualify						
(Estonia) 2026	did not qualify						
(Latvia) 2027	To be determined						
(Lithuania) 2028	To be determined						
(Moldova) 2029	To be determined						
Total	2/21	7	2	2	3	7	10

== Players ==
=== Current squad ===
The following players were called up for the most recent 2026 UEFA European Under-17 Championship qualification matches.

No.	Pos.	Player	Date of birth (age)	Club
1	GK	Haakon Bleken Norda	2 April 2009 (age 17)	(Royal Dutch Football Association) Feyenoord
12	GK	Oskar Rikard Nilsson	23 June 2009 (age 17)	(Danish Football Association) Nordsjælland
13	DF	John Kenneth Provido Gundersen	12 February 2009 (age 17)	(Norwegian Football Federation) Ranheim IF
2	DF	Andreas Wilhelmsen	21 March 2009 (age 17)	(Norwegian Football Federation) Brann
4	DF	Emil Lunde Hillestad	11 February 2009 (age 17)	(Norwegian Football Federation) Sogndal
5	DF	Ulrik Hald-Hernes	22 April 2009 (age 17)	(Norwegian Football Federation) Rosenborg
14	DF	Jakob Rønningen	5 May 2009 (age 17)	(Norwegian Football Federation) Aalesund
3	DF	Daniel Bayam Sylte	14 February 2009 (age 17)	(Norwegian Football Federation) Molde
18	MF	Matheo André Arntzen	10 April 2009 (age 17)	(Italian Football Federation) Inter Milan
8	MF	Lucas Myklebust	10 February 2009 (age 17)	(Norwegian Football Federation) Stabæk
17	MF	Even Forcha	20 July 2009 (age 17)	(Norwegian Football Federation) Vålerenga
20	MF	Elias Samuelsen Arifagic	5 February 2009 (age 17)	(Norwegian Football Federation) Viking
10	MF	Aleksander Borgersen (captain)	24 June 2009 (age 17)	(Norwegian Football Federation) Rosenborg
7	FW	Kevin André Dæhlin	21 August 2009 (age 17)	(Norwegian Football Federation) Strømsgodset
19	FW	Patrik Tørset Johnsen	20 May 2009 (age 17)	(German Football Association) RB Leipzig
9	FW	Abel Cedergren	26 June 2009 (age 17)	(Football Association of the Czech Republic) Slavia Praha
15	FW	Mats Spiten	8 January 2010 (age 16)	(Norwegian Football Federation) Strømsgodset
6	FW	Sondre Bakken	29 July 2009 (age 17)	(Norwegian Football Federation) Viking
11	FW	Aleksander Lilletun Elvebu	22 March 2009 (age 17)	(Norwegian Football Federation) Tromsø
16	FW	Marius Østbye Eriksrud	26 January 2009 (age 17)	(Norwegian Football Federation) Strømsgodset
