= Solveig Kaurin =

Norwegian painter (1896–1977)

Solveig Kaurin (27 June 1896 – 15 June 1977) was a Norwegian painter and printmaker.

She was born in Kristiansund. She made her debut at the Autumn Exhibition in 1916, returning in 1919 before studying at the Norwegian National Academy of Fine Arts from 1921 to 1925 under Christian Krohg. She also spent the year 1925–26 in Paris, learning from André Lhote and Fernand Léger. She married fellow painter Johan Lie-Gjemre (1900–1991); they spent time in Spain in the 1930s. They resided in Lommedalen.

Kaurin took part in the Autumn Exhibition again in 1924, 1929, 1930, 1932, 1933, 1936–1940, 1945, 1946, 1948, 1952–1955 and 1965. She had numerous solo exhibitions in Norway, as well as being part of group exhibitions abroad in Helsinki, Riga, København, Roma, Paris, Stockholm and at the São Paulo Bienal of 1955. Her works were bought by the National Gallery (woodcuts including Sorg, 1933), Ateneum, Oslo Municipality and others. In 1976 she issued the poetry collection Himmel, hav, jord, illustrated by Johan Lie-Gjemre.
