= Gro Dahle =

Norwegian poet and writer

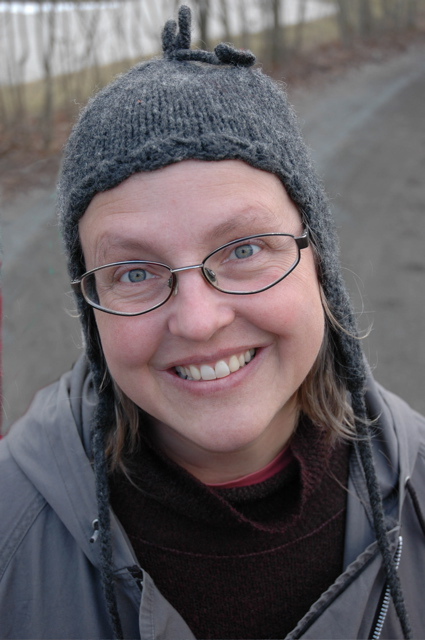
- Dahle in 2005
- Born: 15 May 1962 (age 64); Oslo, Norway
- Occupations: Poet, writer of children's books
- Spouse: Svein Nyhus
- Relatives: Øystein Dahle (father)
- Writing career
- Genres: Poetry, children's literature, short stories, plays etc.

Gro Dahle (born 15 May 1962) is a Norwegian poet and writer.

== Early life ==
Dahle was born in Oslo, and is the daughter of businessman Øystein Dahle. She grew up in Tønsberg, Aruba and New Jersey. She began studying psychology and English literature at University of Oslo and got her B.A. She went to further study creative writing at Telemark University College.

== Career ==
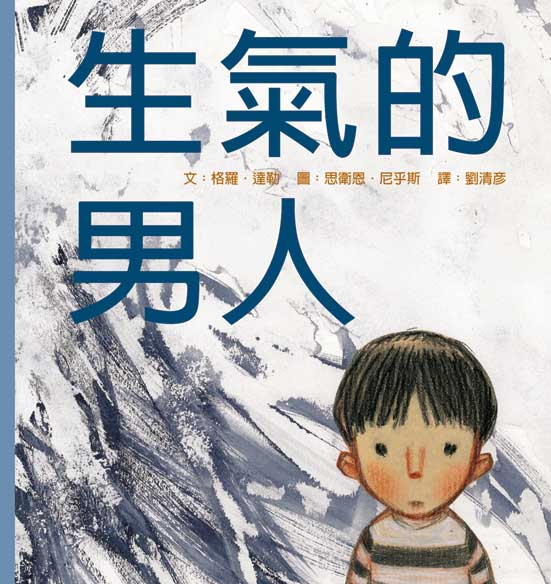
Taiwanese edition of children's book Sinna Mann (Angry man, 2003) by Gro Dahle and Svein Nyhus.

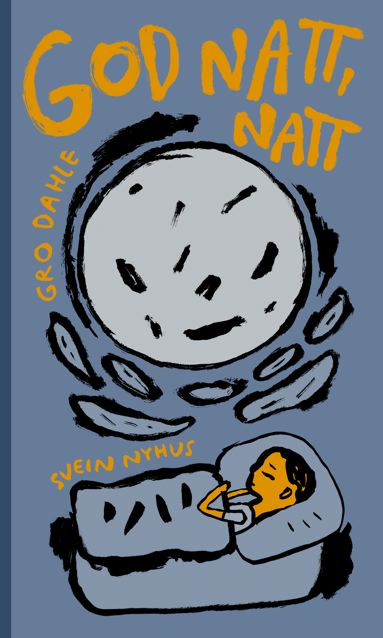
Children's picture book God natt, natt (Good Night, Night, 2009) with poems by Gro Dahle and illustrations by Svein Nyhus.

Dahle made her literary début in 1987 with Audiens (Audience), a collection of poetry. Since then Dahle has written over 50 books in different genres, poetry collections, three novels, three novellas, short stories, children' s theatre pieces, radio plays, essays and children's books. Several picture books for children arose from collaboration with her husband, Norwegian illustrator and author Svein Nyhus.

Dahle has received several national awards for her work. In 1999 she was the official festival poet at the Bergen International Festival. In 2002 she won the Brage Prize for literature for Snill (Nice), a picture book for children, and in 2003 the Best Children's Book Prize from the Norwegian Ministry of Culture for Sinna Mann (Angry Man), a book about a boy witnessing domestic violence.

Dahle is a stylistically naïve, imaginative and burlesque writer often focusing on psychological problems and relations. She also gives lectures in creative writing in Norway and Sweden.

In 2013 A Hundred Thousand Hours (original Norwegian title Hundre tusen timer, 1996) was published in English.

== Personal life ==
Dahle lives and works on the island of Tjøme. She has Asperger syndrome.

== Honours and awards ==
- 1998: Vestfolds Litteraturpris
- 1998: Aschehoug Prize
- 2000: Cappelen Prize
- 2002: Brage Prize for picture book Snill (with illustrator Svein Nyhus)
- 2003: Teskjekjerringprisen
- 2003: Kultur- og kirkedepartementets bildebokpris for barne- og ungdomslitteratur for Sinna Mann (sammen med Svein Nyhus)
- 2014: Norwegian Critics Prize for Literature for the year's best children's or youth's literature (with illustrator Svein Nyhus)
- 2015: Triztan Vindtorn Poesipris - Norwegian poetry award

Awards
Preceded by Georg Johannesen	Recipient of the Cappelen Prize; 2000	Succeeded by Anne Holt
Preceded by Anne B. Ragde	Recipient of the Brage Prize for children and youth 2002 (with Svein Nyhus)	Succeeded by Helga Gunerius Eriksen; Gry Moursund
