= Why Kings and Queens Don't Wear Crowns =

Book by Princess Märtha Louise of Norway

- Author: Princess Märtha Louise of Norway
- Illustrator: Svein Nyhus
- Language: English
- Genre: Children's
- Publisher: Skandisk
- Publication date: 30 September 2006
- Publication place: United States
- Media type: Print (Hardcover) & Audio Book)
- Pages: 32 pp (hardcover edition)
- ISBN: 978-1-57534-038-8 (hardcover edition)
- OCLC: 137294522

Why Kings and Queens Don't Wear Crowns is a fairytale written by Princess Märtha Louise of Norway and released as a children's book in the US in 2005. The original version was released as a picture book in Norway in 2004.

The story is about the author's grandfather, King Olav V, when he first came from Denmark to Norway. It tells about how difficult it was to wear crowns while cross country skiing amongst other typical Norwegian winter activities. The illustrations in the book are made by the Norwegian artist Svein Nyhus.

Why Kings and Queens Don't Wear Crowns was a finalist for the 2005 INDIES Award for Children's Picture Books.
