= Anne B. Ragde =

Norwegian novelist (born 1957)

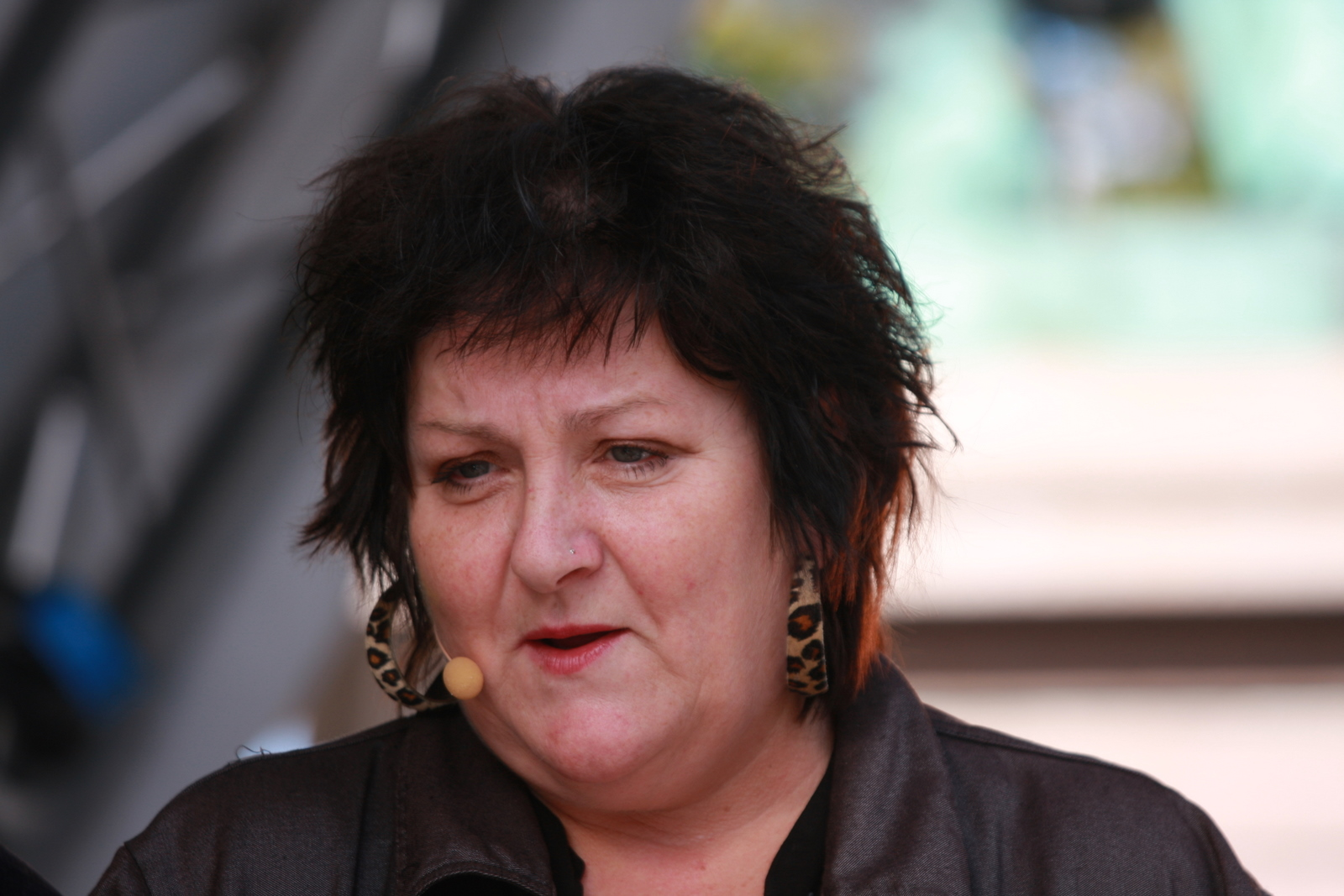
Anne B. Ragde during Oslo Bokfestival 2010

Anne Birkefeldt Ragde (born 3 December 1957) is a Norwegian novelist.

== Early life and education ==
Ragde was born in Odda, the daughter of photographer Olav Ivarson Ragde and his Danish wife Birte, née Birkefeldt. She moved to Trondheim at the age of four, and attended Strinda gymnas and Trondheim Cathedral School. She took the cand.philol. degree at the University of Trondheim in 1984, and worked as a lecturer there for two and a half years before becoming an advertising copywriter.

== Career ==
Ragde made her literary debut in 1986 with the children’s book Hallo! Her er Jo! Since then, she has written several books for children and young adults, among them a biography about Sigrid Undset, for which she was awarded the Brage Prize. Her first novel for adults, En tiger for en engel was published in 1990. She has since written several novels, crime novels and short story collections.

Her novel Berlin Poplars (Berlinerpoplene, 2004), the first in a series about the Neshov family of Byneset near Trondheim, received a warm welcome from both readers and critics. The sequels Hermit Crabs (2005) and Pastures Green (2007) were a no lesser success, and by 2010 the trilogy had sold well over a million copies. The series was later extended with Alltid tilgivelse (2016), Liebhaberne (2017) and Datteren (2019). The English translation of Berlin Poplars by James Anderson was reviewed favourably in The Independent in 2008. The trilogy was adapted both for the stage and as an eight-part television drama series on NRK, and both adaptations were great popular successes. Her books have been translated into more than 20 languages.

== Piracy controversy ==
In a December 2010 interview with Dagens Næringsliv, Ragde said that she was losing sleep over illegal downloading of her books, that she had lost more than half a million kroner to piracy, and that she would therefore not allow her new novel to be released as an audiobook. In the same interview it emerged that her iPod held about 1,800 illegally downloaded songs. Law professor Olav Torvund accused her of double standards, and several musicians also criticised her. Ragde said that her remarks had been taken out of context, that her son had put the songs on the iPod several years earlier without her knowledge, and that she agreed that illegal downloading was theft.

== Selected bibliography ==
- 1986: Hallo! Her er Jo!
- 1988: Dumme mamma!
- 1990: En tiger for en engel
- 1995: Zona Frigida
- 1997: Bunnforhold
- 1999: En kald dag i helvete
- 1999: Lille Petter Edderkopp
- 2001: Arsenikktårnet
- 2001: Biografien om Sigrid Undset. Ogsaa en ung Pige
- 2002: Dr. Zellwegers gave
- 2003: Fosterstilling
- 2004: Berlin Poplars (Berlinerpoplene)
- 2005: Hermit Crabs (Eremittkrepsene)
- 2005: På bunnen av havet ligger et slott
- 2007: Pastures Green (Ligge i grønne enger)
- 2009: Nightwaves (Nattønsket)
- 2011: Jeg skal gjøre deg så lykkelig
- 2014: Jeg har et teppe i tusen farger
- 2016: Alltid tilgivelse
- 2017: Liebhaberne
- 2019: Datteren
- 2021: Hjerteknuseren
- 2022: Muttra og meg
- 2024: Hennes siste fantastiske dager

== Awards and prizes ==
- Brage Prize 2001, for Ogsaa en ung Pige
- Ministry of Culture's non-fiction prize (Kulturdepartementets fagbokpremie) 2001, for Ogsaa en ung Pige
- Riksmål Society Literature Prize 2004, for Berlin Poplars
- Norwegian Booksellers' Prize 2005, for Hermit Crabs
- The Norwegian Readers' Prize 2005, for Hermit Crabs
- Trondheim Municipality's culture prize 2005
- Årets trønder (Trønder of the Year) 2006, voted by the readers of Adresseavisen

Awards
Preceded by Rune Belsvik	Recipient of the Brage Prize for children and youth 2001	Succeeded by Gro Dahle; Svein Nyhus
