= Øystein Dahle =

Norwegian businessman (born 1938)

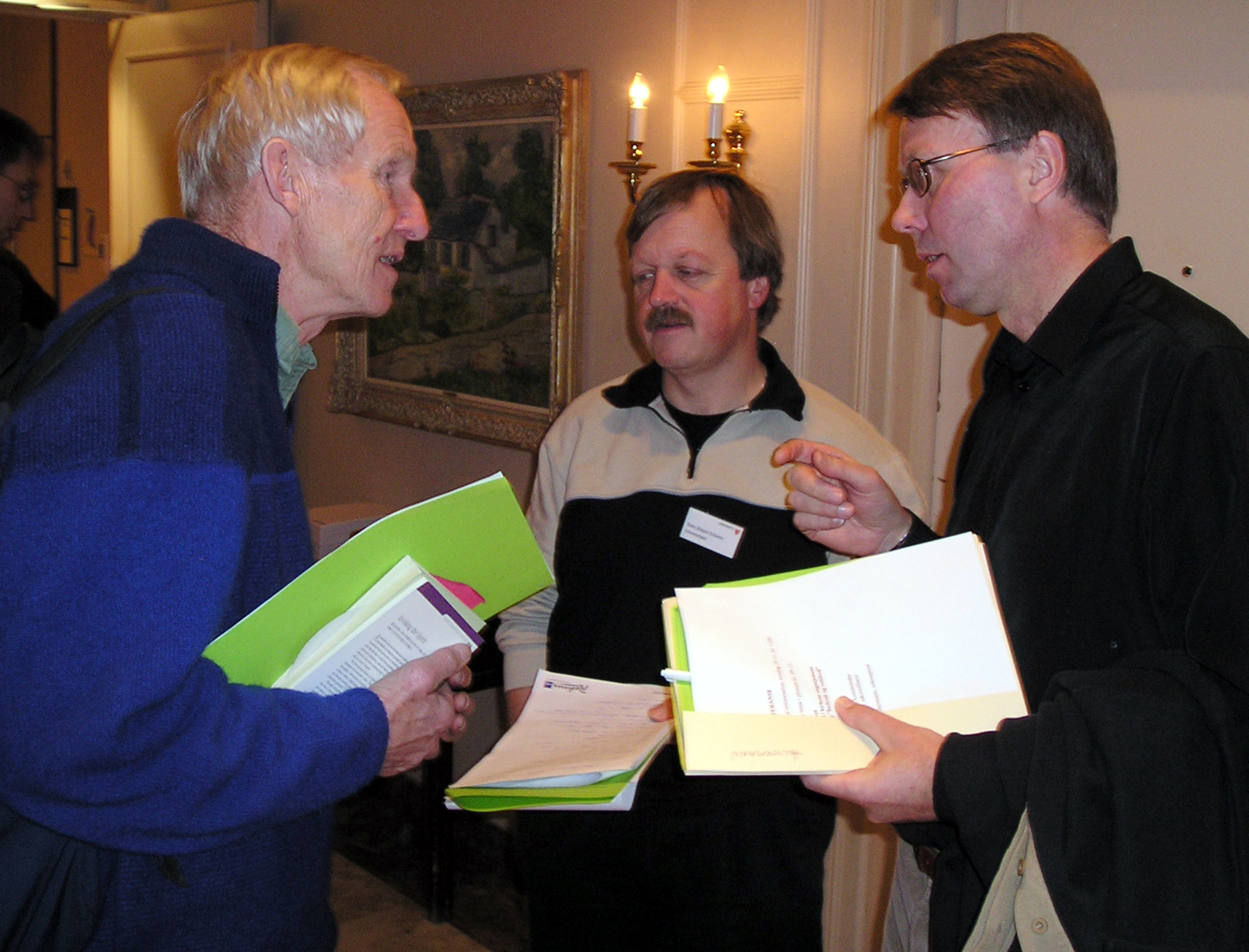
- Dahle (left) talking to Hans Jürgen Schorre and Harold Haltermann in 2003.
- Born: 18 March 1938 (age 88); Trondheim, Norway
- Occupations: Businessperson and organizational leader
- Spouse: Nina Frisak
- Children: Gro Dahle

Øystein Dahle (born 18 March 1938) is a former Norwegian businessperson and organizational leader.

== Early life and career ==
He was born in Trondheim. He worked in Esso from 1963, and was Vice President of Esso Norway from 1985 to 1995. He was the chairman of the Norwegian Trekking Association from 1994 to 2003, and in the Worldwatch Institute from 2002. He is a fellow of the Norwegian Academy of Technological Sciences.

== Personal life ==
He is the father of poet Gro Dahle (born 1962) and married to former civil servant Nina Frisak (born 1950).
