= Succession to the Norwegian throne =

Law governing who can become Norwegian monarch

The line of succession to the Norwegian throne consists of people entitled to become head of state of Norway.

The succession is governed by Article 6 of the Constitution, altered most recently in 1990 to introduce absolute primogeniture among the grandchildren and further eligible descendants of King Harald V. Harald's children were ranked according to male-preference cognatic primogeniture, which was in place between 1971 and 1990; his son Haakon and his eligible descendants thus took precedence over Princess Märtha Louise and her eligible descendants. Prior to 1971, agnatic primogeniture was employed, meaning that only males could inherit.

Only legitimate descendants of the last monarch and the last monarch's siblings and their legitimate descendants can be in line to the throne.

If there is no heir to the throne, the Storting (parliament) has the power to determine the successor under Article 7, while Article 48 provides for the election of a new monarch if the royal line has died out and no successor has been designated.

Under Article 9 of the Constitution, a monarch who is of age must take an oath upon assuming the government, before the Storting. If the Storting is not in session, the oath is initially given in writing before the Council of State and repeated at the first subsequent Storting.

== Line of succession ==
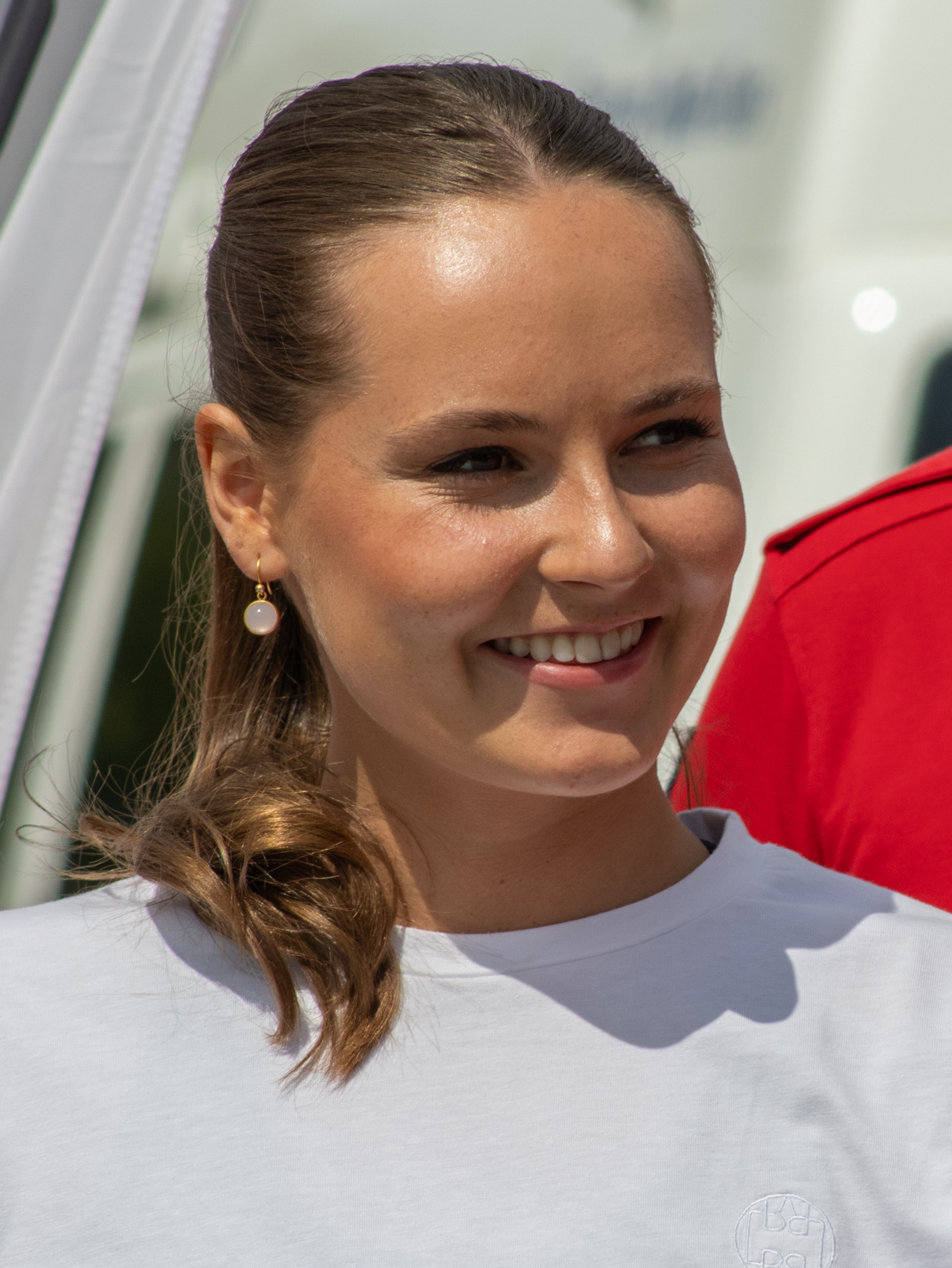
Ingrid Alexandra, Crown Princess of Norway

- King Harald V (1937–2026)
  - King Haakon VIII (born 1973)
    - (1) Crown Princess Ingrid Alexandra (b. 2004)
    - (2) Prince Sverre Magnus (b. 2005)
  - (3) Princess Märtha Louise (b. 1971)
    - (4) Maud Angelica Behn (b. 2003)
    - (5) Leah Isadora Behn (b. 2005)
    - (6) Emma Tallulah Behn (b. 2008)

== See also ==
- Norwegian Law of Succession
