= Helga Gunerius Eriksen =

Norwegian novelist and children's writer

Helga G. Eriksen
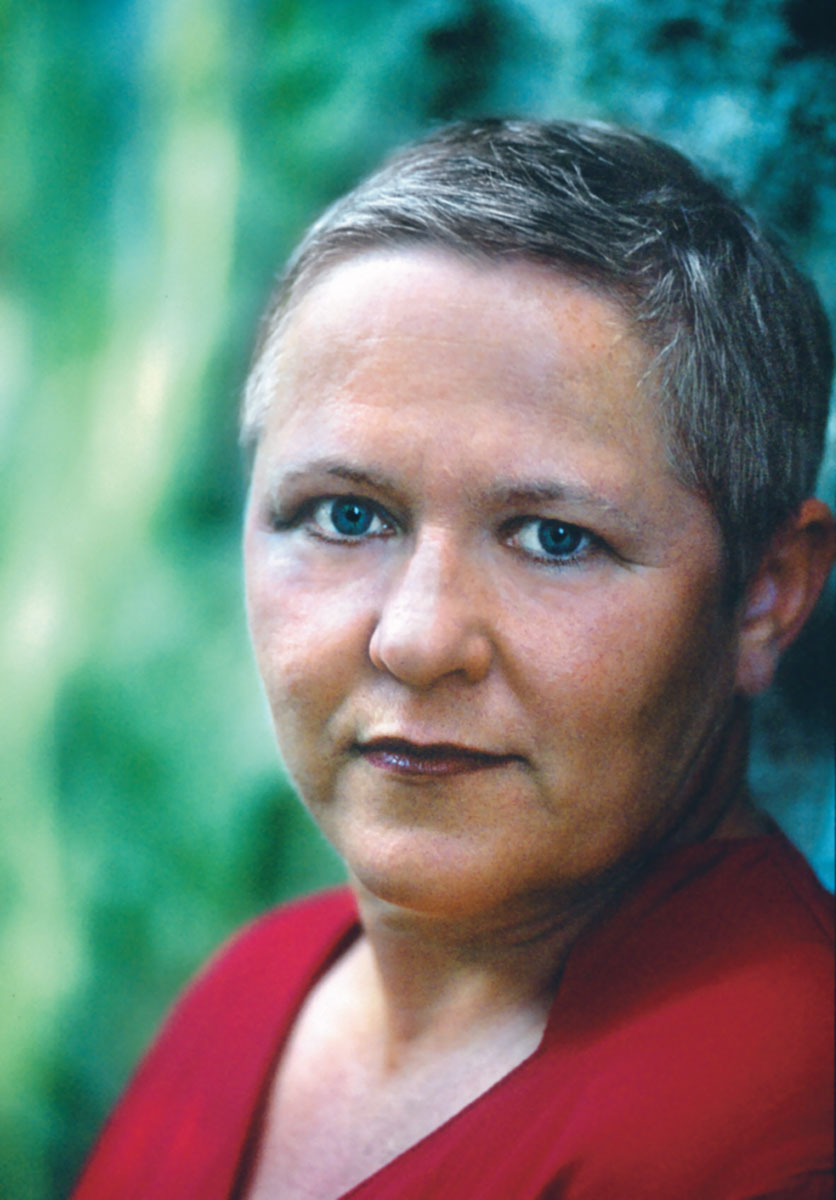
- Helga Gunerius Eriksen.
- Born: Helga Gunerius Eriksen; 11 October 1950 (age 75); Stavanger, Norway
- Occupations: Literature, Writer
- Years active: 1986 – presents
- Awards: Brage Prize

Helga Gunerius Eriksen (born 11 October 1950) is a Norwegian novelist and children's writer.

She made her literary debut in 1986 with the children's book På stripejakt. Among her other children's books are Båten i treet from 1988, Vi kjem frå havet from 1998, and Flugepapir from 2003, which earned her the Brage Prize. Among her novels is Rut from 2002.

She was awarded the Critics Prize for the year's best children's or youth's literature for Finn Inga! in 1991.

Awards
Preceded by Gro Dahle; Svein Nyhus	Recipient of the Brage Prize for children and youth 2003 (with Gry Moursund)	Succeeded by Harald Rosenløw Eeg
