= Nina Frisak =

Norwegian judge and civil servant (born 1950)

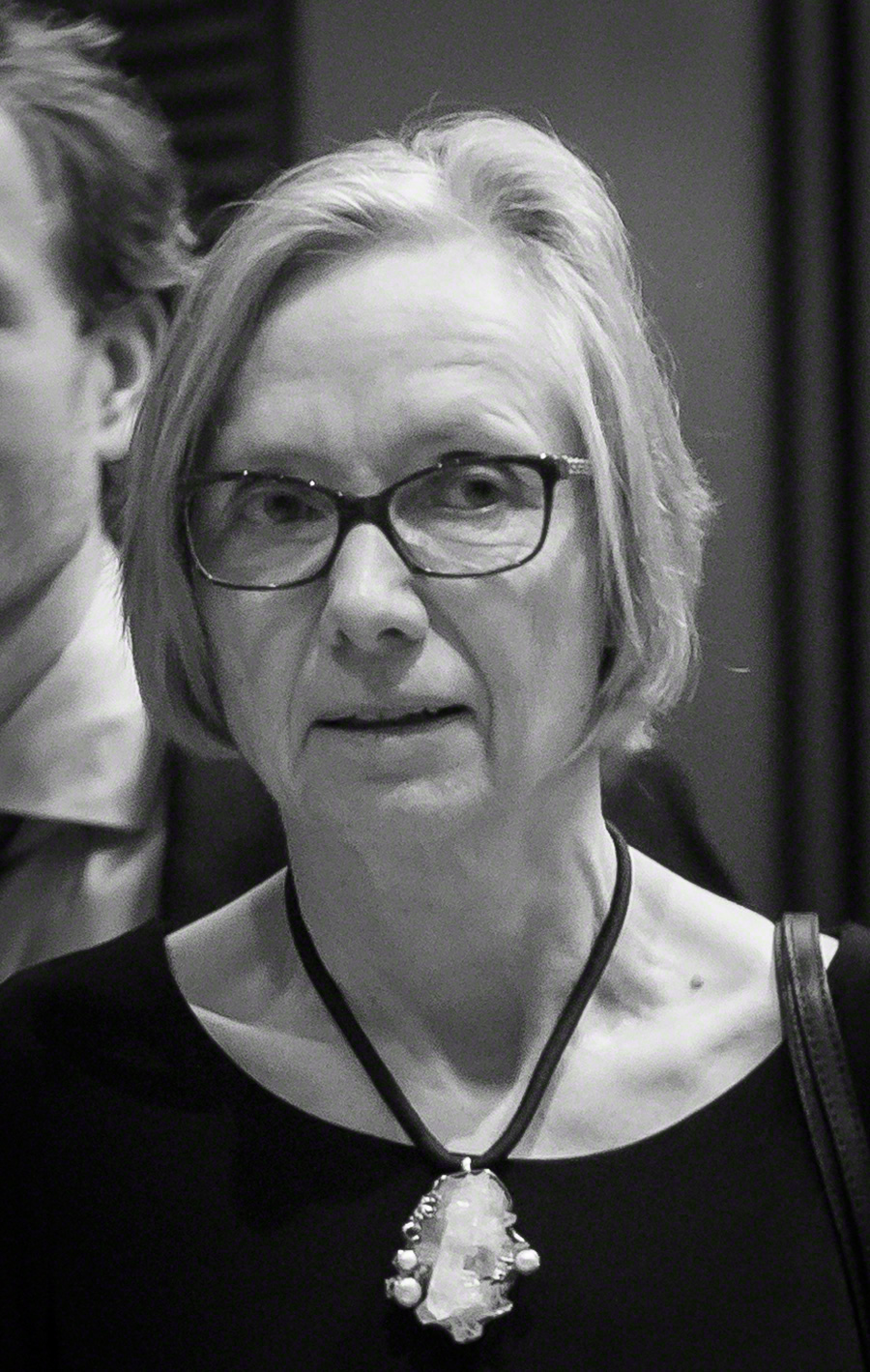
- Frisak in 2016
- Born: 28 November 1950 (age 75); Oslo, Norway
- Occupations: Judge and civil servant
- Spouse: Øystein Dahle

Nina Frisak (born 28 November 1950) is a Norwegian judge and civil servant. She was the Secretary to the Government from 2001 to 2016.

Frisak was born in Oslo. She graduated from the University of Oslo with the cand.jur. degree in 1977, and was a lawyer's trainee in London from 1977 to 1978 and in Oslo from 1979 to 1981. She then worked as an assistant secretary in the Norwegian Ministry of Justice and the Police from 1981 to 1988. From 1988 to 1991 she was a lawyer in the Nordisk Defence Club. She was then a presiding judge in Eidsivating Court of Appeal from 1991 to 1995, went back to the bureaucracy as deputy under-secretary of state in the Norwegian Office of the Prime Minister from 1995 to 2000, and then became a judge again; a Supreme Court Justice from 2000 to 2001.

In 2001 she was hired as permanent under-secretary of state in the Office of the Prime Minister, succeeding Bjørn T. Grydeland. This particular position was not called permanent under-secretary; rather Secretary General at the Office of the Prime Minister, but in November 2001 the name was changed to Secretary to the Government (Norwegian: regjeringsråd). The position is the highest-ranking civil servant position in Norway, and entails, besides leading the Office of the Prime Minister, to lead the secretariat of the entire Council of State. The first woman to hold this position, Frisak has been ranked among Norway's most powerful women on numerous occasions. The position is non-partisan.

Frisak is also the chancellor for the committee that awards the Royal Norwegian Order of St. Olav. She was decorated as a Commander with Star of the Order in 2004. Frisak is holds the Grand Cross (First Class) of the Estonian Order of the Cross of Terra Mariana.

She is married to former organizational leader Øystein Dahle.

Civic offices
Preceded by Bjørn T. Grydeland	Secretary to the Government of Norway; 2001–2016	Succeeded by Anne Nafstad Lyftingsmo
