= Anne Nafstad Lyftingsmo =

Norwegian civil servant (born 1968)

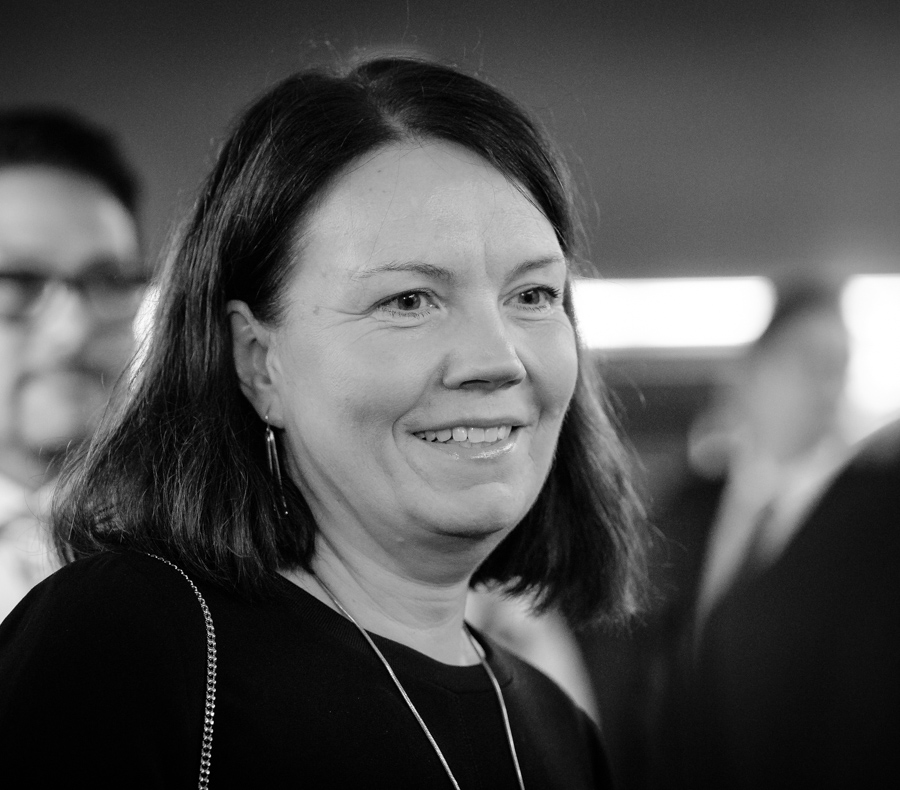

Anne Nafstad Lyftingsmo (born 24 March 1968 in Oslo) is a Norwegian civil servant, who serves as the Secretary to the Government (Cabinet Secretary), the most senior civil servant in the government. She has studied business administration and worked as a consultant at ECON Analyse and at Statistics Norway before joining the central government administration. In 2006 she became Director-General in the Ministry of Local Government and Regional Development. She later moved to the Prime Minister's Office, where she was a Director-General before becoming the Secretary to the Government in 2016.

Civic offices
Preceded by Nina Frisak	Secretary to the Government of Norway; 2016–present	Incumbent
