= Leah Isadora Behn =

Member of the Norwegian Royal family

- Born: 8 April 2005 (age 21); Hankø, Fredrikstad, Norway
- Parent(s): Ari Behn; Princess Märtha Louise of Norway

Leah Isadora Behn (born 8 April 2005) is the second daughter of Princess Märtha Louise of Norway and her late former husband Ari Behn, and a grandchild of King Harald V and Queen Sonja of Norway. She is the fifth in the line of succession to the Norwegian throne, after her sister Maud Angelica.

Behn – both a beauty entrepreneur and an influencer – and her sisters hold no royal titles, are private citizens, and are free to pursue their own interests.

== Birth and baptism ==
The second daughter of Princess Märtha Louise, Behn was born at Bloksbjerg, her mother's summer residence on the island of Hankø, Norway.

On 16 June 2005, she was christened in the chapel of the Royal Palace, Oslo. Her godparents were Princess Laurentien of the Netherlands, her mother's friends Gry Brusletto and Katharina Salbu, her father's brother Espen Bjørshol, her father's friend Jon Andreas Håtun, and Didrik Vigsnæs, the husband of Princess Märtha Louise's bridesmaid and second cousin Marianne Ulrichsen. Behn's grandmother, Queen Sonja, carried her to the baptismal font. The christening made headlines around the world when Behn's mother, Märtha Louise, revealed that the name Leah had been inspired by the Star Wars character Princess Leia. Märtha Louise said in an interview with the newspaper Aftenposten, "I must admit that I have always been a big 'Star Wars' fan, and Princess Leia has always been the most beautiful in the whole world".

== Family ==
Behn has an older sister, Maud Angelica, a poet and illustrator, and a younger one, Emma Tallulah, an equestrian. The family lived in Islington, London, then in New York, and finally in Lommedalen, a valley outside Oslo.

On 5 August 2016, Behn’s parents started divorce proceedings, intending to share custody of their daughters, and the divorce was finalized in 2017. Her father, Ari Behn, died by suicide on Christmas Day, 2019. His funeral service was held in Oslo Cathedral. In April 2021, her mother revealed that she was planning to move to the United States with Behn and her sisters when the problems of COVID-19 were out of the way, but they did not.

== Social life and career ==
In November 2022, Behn became the first Norwegian debutante to be presented at Le Bal des débutantes in Paris.

In 2024, Behn has a combined reach of over 600,000 on TikTok, Instagram and YouTube, with her 'GRWM' (Get Ready With Me) makeup and skincare videos racking up over a million views. Signed to Norway’s leading influencer agency, Kontent, she launched her first business, a beauty brand called ‘Dorah by Leah’, after her middle name Isadora.

For 2023 and 2025, she has won twice at the Vixen Awards, rewarding the best influencers in Norway, the Influencer of the Year award in the beauty category.

Leah Isadora Behn House of Schleswig-Holstein-Sonderburg-Glücksburg Cadet branch of the House of Oldenburg Born: 8 April 2005
Lines of succession
Preceded by Maud Angelica Behn	Succession to the Norwegian throne 5th position	Succeeded by Emma Tallulah Behn
