= Ängsbacka =

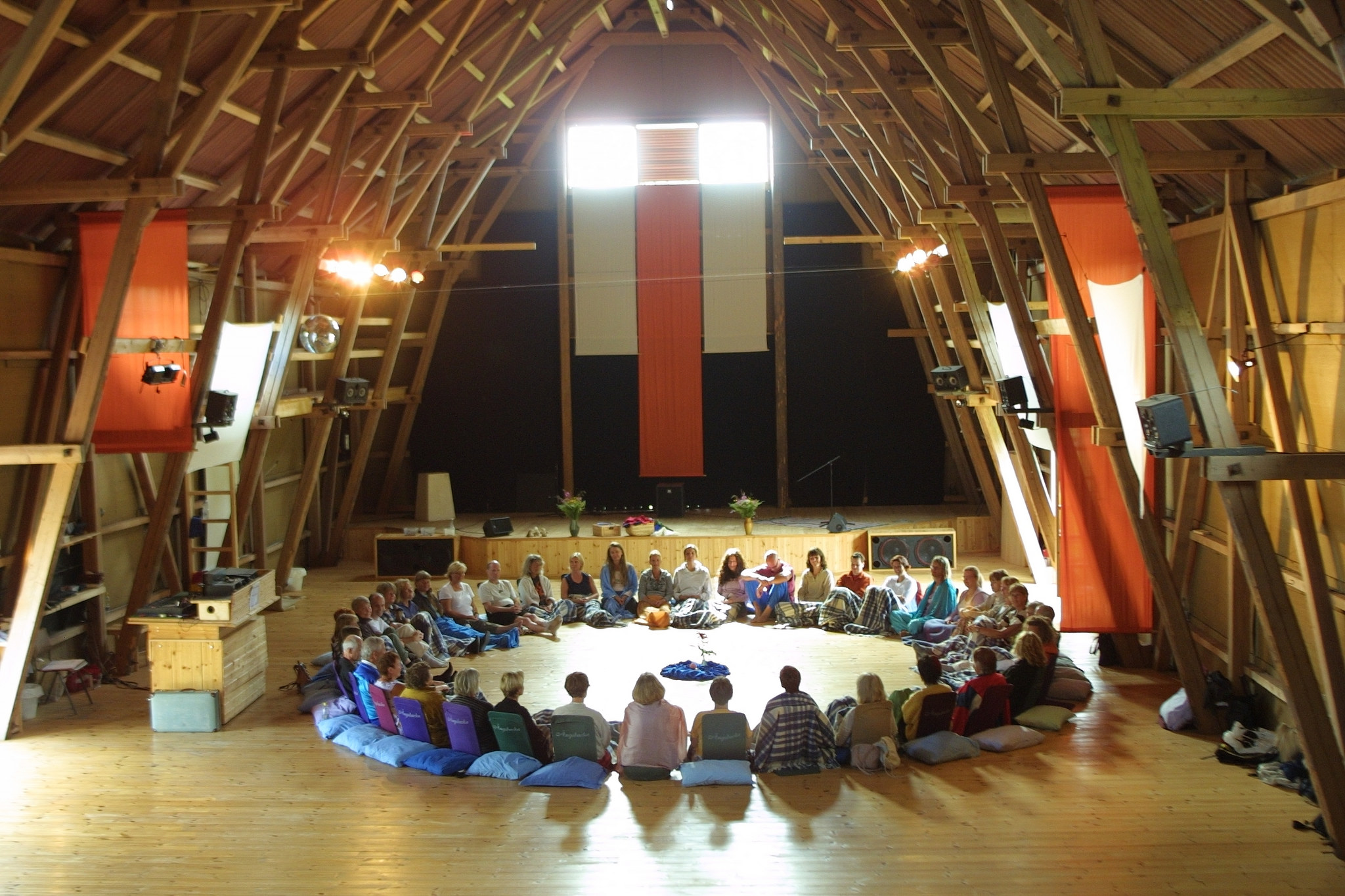
Ängsbacka Association meeting

Ängsbacka is a course and festival center focused on personal development, yoga, Tantra, dance, meditation, spirituality and self-expression. It is located in Molkom, Sweden, and was started in 1996.

The center hosts an average of eight festivals per year, mainly during the summer. Although Ängsbacka's Tantra Festival is the largest in Sweden, the No Mind Festival is the largest of the festivals with around a thousand participants. Vegetarian food is served.

It is registered as a not-for-profit organization owned by members and is run in a large part by volunteers.

The course center and its No Mind Festival were the feature of the 2008 documentary Three Miles North of Molkom.
