= Maud Angelica Behn =

Member of the Norwegian royal family (born 2003)

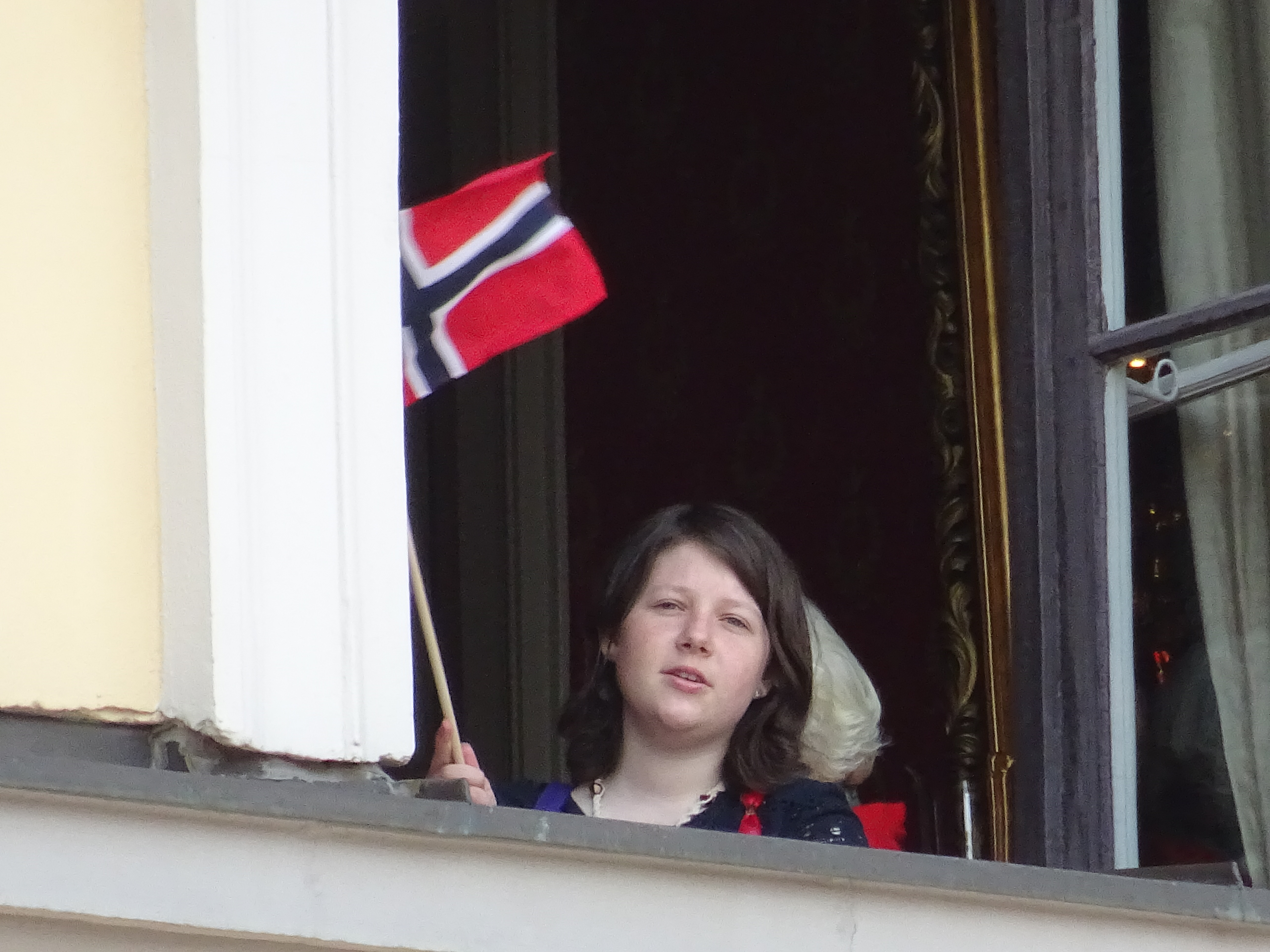
- Maud in 2018
- Born: 29 April 2003 (age 23); The National Hospital, Oslo, Norway
- Parents: Ari Behn (father); Princess Märtha Louise of Norway (mother)
- Relatives: Leah Isadora Behn (sister)

Maud Angelica Behn (born 29 April 2003) is the first born child of Princess Märtha Louise of Norway and her late husband Ari Behn, and the eldest grandchild of King Harald V of Norway and Queen Sonja. She is a private citizen and holds no royal titles.

Behn came to national attention with the speech she gave at her father's funeral and published her first book in 2021.

In June 2025, she came out as bisexual through an Instagram post with images from Oslo Pride celebrations.

== Birth and baptism ==
Maud Angelica Behn was born on 29 April 2003 at The National Hospital, a University Hospital in Oslo, Norway, where her mother had also been born. Her great-great-grandmother was Maud of Wales, youngest daughter of King Edward VII of the United Kingdom.

Behn was christened at Slottskapellet, Royal Palace, Oslo, Norway on 2 July 2003, the one-hundredth birthday of her great-grandfather King Olav V. Her grandfather King Harald V, uncle Crown Prince Haakon, aunt Anja Sabrina Bjørshol, maternal first cousin once removed Marianne Ulrichsen, Princess Alexandra of Sayn-Wittgenstein-Berleburg, the actor Kåre Conradi and the politician Trond Giske stood as godparents.

She has two younger sisters, Leah Isadora Behn, a beauty entrepreneur, and Emma Tallulah Behn, a show jumping champion.

== Succession to the throne ==
Maud Angelica Behn is the eldest grandchild of Norway's King Harald and Queen Sonja. In 1990, the Norwegian constitution was changed, introducing full cognatic primogeniture to the Norwegian throne, so that the eldest child, regardless of sex, comes first in the line of succession. However, this change was made without displacing Crown Prince Haakon, as it only affects those born after 1989. Controversially, women born between 1971 and 1989 (in practice, only Behn's mother Märtha Louise), were given succession rights, but primogeniture would not apply. At present, she is fourth in the line of succession to the Norwegian throne.

== Education ==
The Behn family lived in Islington, London, then in New York, and finally in Lommedalen, a valley outside Oslo.

In the autumn of 2009, Maud Angelica Behn was enrolled at the Bærum Waldorf School (Norwegian: Steinerskolen i Bærum), an independent Steiner school in Bærum, a suburb west of Oslo.

== Family ==
On 5 August 2016, her parents began divorce proceedings, which were finalized in 2017. Ari Behn died by suicide on Christmas Day, 2019, and was buried in Oslo Cathedral.

Behn made a speech at her father's funeral and later talked about his death. In an article devoted to the speech, Aftenposten commented "It does not get more powerful than this".

In 2021, Princess Märtha Louise stated that she was planning to move to the United States with her daughters when the COVID-19 pandemic was out of the way, but they did not.

== Career ==
She consolidated her thoughts on mental health and suicide, writing as a poet and illustrator her debut piece: Threads of Tears, her first book published in October 2021. Combining artistic and literary skills, her book tells the story of a young girl whose life is dark but who uses her tears as material for weaving. She had already been awarded the Acute Psychiatry Prize for 2020 and Threads of Tears – with ten thousand copies printed – skyrocketed to the top of the Norwegian Booksellers Association bestseller list in 2021.

In 2022, she competed in the Norwegian version of Masked Singer, Maskorama.

Behn regularly publishes her own drawings on Instagram.

Maud Angelica Behn House of Schleswig-Holstein-Sonderburg-Glücksburg Cadet branch of the House of Oldenburg Born: 29 April 2003
Lines of succession
Preceded by Princess Märtha Louise of Norway	Succession to the Norwegian throne 4th position	Succeeded by Leah Isadora Behn
