= No Mind Festival =

The No Mind Festival is an annual alternative festival that has taken place in Ängsbacka, Sweden each summer since 1997 and is sometimes referred to as Ängsbacka's Glastonbury. Its roots are drawn from the No Mind philosophy of Osho, the Indian mystic who popularized No Mind meditation. It is counted amongst the largest alternative festivals in Europe and regularly attracts around 1,000 participants.

The festival usually takes place in early July and lasts for seven days. It is a strictly drug and alcohol-free event and includes a 'festival within a festival' for participants under 18.
