= Bertrand Besigye =

Norwegian writer

Bertrand Besigye (born 24 October 1972 in Kampala, Uganda) is a notable Norwegian writer commonly known for his poetry. He made his debut in 1993 with the poetry collection Og du dør så langsomt at du tror du lever, for which he won the Tarjei Vesaas' debutantpris.

Besigye's family fled during the Idi Amin's regime in the mid-1970s who after settled in Norway. His poetry has been translated and included some anthologies for example Afro-Nordic Landscapes which has made his work more accessible to a bigger audience.

== Bibliography ==
- Og du dør så langsomt at du tror du lever – poetry, 1993
- Krystallisert sollys – poetry, 2003
- Svastikastjernen – novel, 2004
- Og Solen Tilber Ingen Andre Guder Enn Sin Egen Styrke – poetry, 2010
