= Princess Märtha Louise of Norway =

Norwegian princess (born 1971)

Princess Märtha Louise
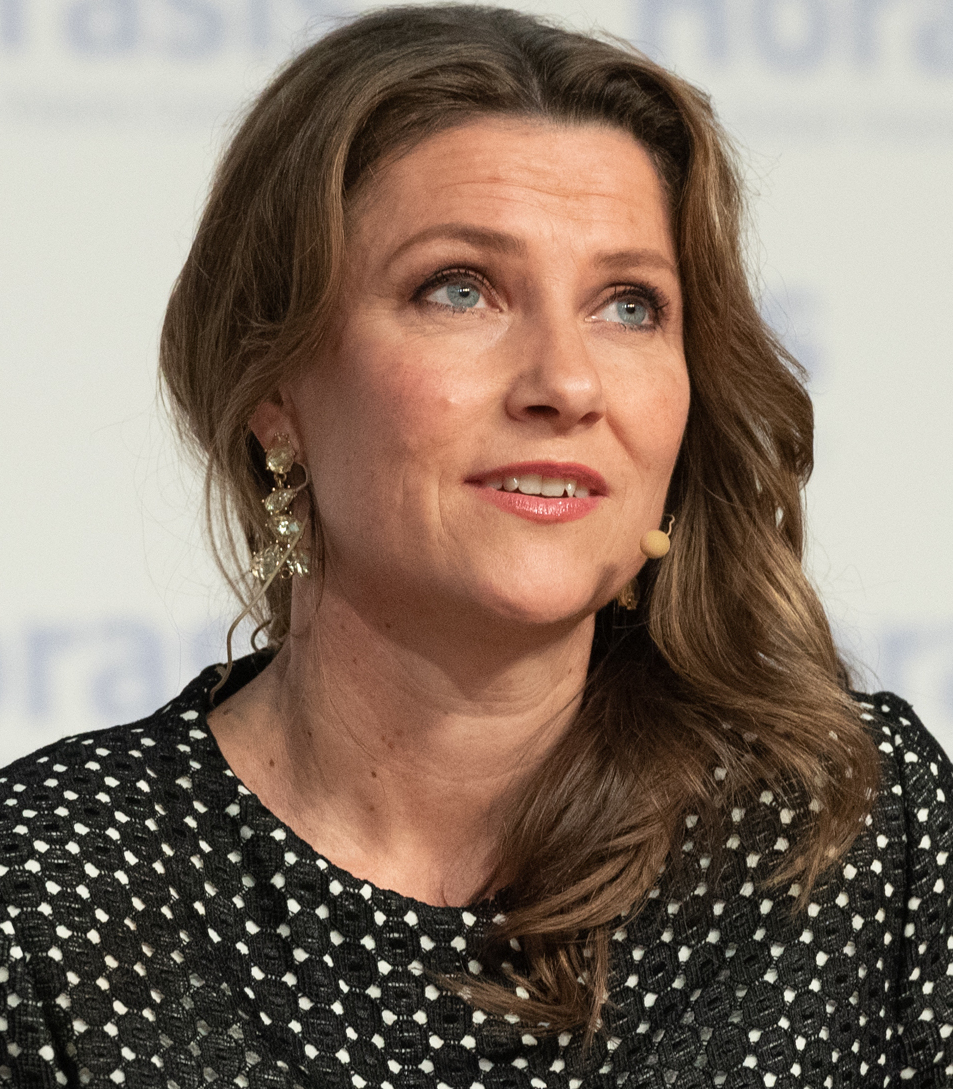
- Märtha Louise in 2019
- Born: 22 September 1971 (age 55); The National Hospital, Oslo, Norway
- Spouse: Ari Behn (m. 2002; div. 2017) Durek Verrett (m. 2024)
- Children: Maud Angelica Behn; Leah Isadora Behn; Emma Tallulah Behn
- House: Glücksburg
- Father: Harald V
- Mother: Sonja Haraldsen

Princess Märtha Louise of Norway (born 22 September 1971) is a member of the Norwegian royal family, but is not part of the royal house and holds no public role. She is the elder child and only daughter of King Harald V and Queen Sonja, and the elder sister of King Haakon VIII.

At the time of her birth, she had no inheritance rights to the Norwegian throne. This changed in 1990, when she was included in the line of succession behind her younger brother and their father, then-crown prince Harald. She is currently third in the line of succession after Haakon's children Crown Princess Ingrid Alexandra and Prince Sverre Magnus.

She is active in alternative therapy and spiritual practices, and describes herself as clairvoyant. She was married to Ari Behn from 2002 to 2017, and has since married Durek Verrett. She has often faced criticism in Norway for her claims of clairvoyance and for commercially exploiting her constitutional role and title as princess. There have been frequent calls for her to relinquish her royal title and her place in the line of succession.

== Early life ==
Märtha Louise was born on 22 September 1971 at The National Hospital, the Oslo University Hospital, in Oslo, the eldest child of the then Crown Prince Harald (later King Harald V) and Crown Princess Sonja, during the reign of her paternal grandfather King Olav V. She was named after her paternal grandmother and great-great-grandmother. At birth, she was not in line to the throne, because until 1990 only males could inherit the Norwegian throne. She was baptised a few months after her birth. Her godparents are King Olav V, her paternal great-aunt Princess Margaretha of Sweden, her father's first cousin Count Flemming of Rosenborg, her paternal aunt Princess Ragnhild of Norway, her maternal grandmother Dagny Haraldsen, her maternal uncle Haakon Haraldsen, Nils Jørgen Astrup, and Ilmi Riddervold.

In 1973, Märtha Louise's younger brother, Haakon Magnus, was born. In 1990, the Norwegian constitution was altered, granting full cognatic primogeniture to the Norwegian throne for future children born into the royal family, meaning that the eldest child, regardless of sex, would take precedence in the line of succession. Märtha Louise was also given succession rights, but Haakon remainded ahead of her in the line of succession. After the births of her brother's two children, Ingrid Alexandra and Sverre Magnus, Märtha Louise was relegated to fourth in line.

== Education and career ==
Märtha Louise is a certified physiotherapist, following education in Oslo and an internship in Maastricht, the Netherlands. She has not practised that profession, but established her own commercial entertainment business, giving public and televised performances reciting folk tales and singing with well-known Norwegian choirs. In December 2003, she took part in Oslo Gospel Choir's Christmas concert with a solo performance.

On 1 January 2002, Märtha Louise started her own business to work with more freedom from her constitutional role as a princess. She began paying income tax, and the King, after consulting her, issued a royal edict that removed her title of Royal Highness. She is conventionally accorded the lesser title Highness abroad, although it has no legal standing in Norway. Märtha Louise retains her place in the line of succession. She has faced numerous calls to cease using the title "princess" commercially and to relinquish the title altogether in light of her controversial commercial activities. Norwegians have derided her as "Princess Plenty More of Have-It-All" (prinsesse Mertakk av Pose og Sekk). Critics have pointed out that the title "Princess" is not a private or personal title that can be used for private profit, but is a constitutional, public title and role awarded under the Norwegian constitution, ultimately by the Norwegian state. Editor David Stenerud wrote that Märtha "insists on being a Norwegian princess" and that this constitutional title is linked to a public role in Norway.

In 2019, the royal court announced that she would no longer use the title "Princess" in her business activities as a clairvoyant. In 2022, she relinquished her remaining royal duties to concentrate on alternative medicine. She has continued to use the title, drawing criticism for disregarding an agreement not to use "Princess" or her royal connection in commercial activities, interviews, or other public appearances. A majority of Norwegians favoured the removal of her title.

After several postponements due to family births and her father's illness, during which she took on some representation duties, Märtha Louise and her first husband moved to New York City in October 2004. That year, her first book, a children's story about the first royal family of Norway, was released – Why Kings and Queens Don't Wear Crowns.

Märtha Louise has studied physiotherapy, trained as a Rosen therapist, and studied at an academy for holistic medicine. She claims she can communicate with animals and angels and started her own alternative therapy centre named Astarte Education, after one of the oldest goddesses in the Middle East. Astarte Education offered a three-year course on healing, readings, and angels. In 2014, Märtha Louise faced criticism for her association with the British clairvoyant Lisa Williams. Williams, who claims she can communicate with the deceased, gave a seminar for Soulspring, formerly known as the Angel School, which Märtha Louise co‑founded. The Soulspring website stated: "We in Soulspring do not communicate with dead souls in our work. And here is where our work is separate from Lisa's. To be completely honest, we don't see the point of contacting the dead. They passed over to the other side for a reason and should be allowed to stay there." No one representing the royal family commented.

Märtha Louise drew criticism in Norway after announcing Astarte Education. In 2007, Bergens Tidende called for her to give up her royal titles. Norwegian state director of Health Lars E. Hanssen, Norwegian alternative medicine advocate Bernt Rognlien, Norwegian University of Science and Technology (NTNU), religious historian Asbjørn Dyrenda, and University of Oslo theology professor Inge Lønning all expressed misgivings about her plans. In 2015, Swedish author Jan Guillou questioned her mental health.

On 11 August 2007, she defended the school on NRK, the Norwegian public service television network. In the interview, Märtha Louise described her relationship with angels as "creatures of light, which gave her a feeling of a strong presence and a strong and loving support." She responded to criticism that she should leave the Church of Norway by stating she still considered herself a Christian and was thankful the Church still had room for her.

On 2 October 2007, Märtha Louise became the first member of the Norwegian royal family to appear in a court of law, as she sought to halt sales of a book entitled Martha's Angels, which used her photo on its cover without permission. She stated that she felt "commercially exploited" by the book's use of her photo, which she regarded as misuse of her name and picture. Film critic Pål Bang-Hansen stated that she was a "thief and hypocrite", claiming she had stolen translated texts from her father's books.

In 2007, she was editor of the book Prinsesse Märtha Louises eventyrlige verden, Eventyr fra jordens hjerte, Rodinia, containing 67 fairy tales from 50 countries. In 2009, she and her Astarte Education partner Elisabeth Samnøy published Møt din skyttsengel (Meet your guardian angel), followed by Englenes hemmeligheter. Deres natur, språk og hvordan du åpner opp for dem (The secrets of angels: Their nature, language, and how you open up for them).

== Princess Märtha Louise's Fund ==
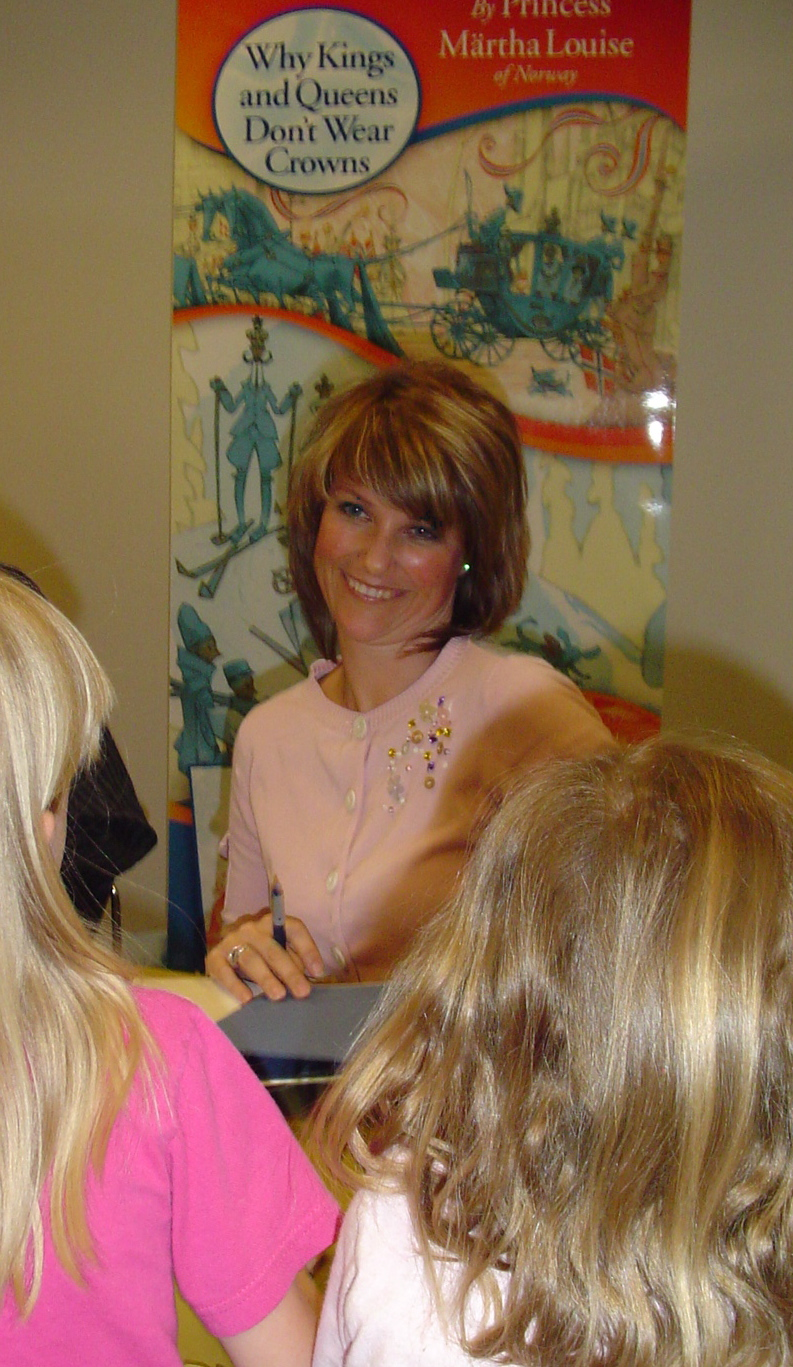
At a 2006 book signing in Minnesota, US.

Princess Märtha Louise's Fund was founded on 15 September 1972 and awards funds to projects carried out by non-governmental organisations to provide assistance to disabled children under the age of 16 in Norway. Märtha Louise is the fund's chairperson. In 2005, the fund had assets of approximately NOK 13,285,000, and total annual allocations came to about NOK 500,000.

== Marriage and family ==
=== First marriage ===
On 24 May 2002, Märtha Louise married author Ari Behn (1972–2019) in Trondheim. (Note: born 1972 as Ari Mikael Bjørshol; he later took his grandmother's name.) The couple had three daughters: Maud Angelica, a poet and illustrator; Leah Isadora, a beauty entrepreneur; and Emma Tallulah, an equestrian. None of the children have royal titles. The family lived in Islington, London, and Lommedalen, Bærum. Emma is a junior member of the national equestrian team and won a bronze medal at the Norwegian National Horse Jumping Championships in 2021.

The couple divorced in 2017. The Royal Court announced that Märtha Louise and Behn would have joint custody of their three daughters. Behn died by suicide on Christmas Day 2019.

=== Second marriage ===
In May 2019, she announced that she was in a relationship with an American citizen, a conspiracy theorist and self-styled shaman named Durek Verrett (born 17 November 1974 as Derek Verrett). Verrett was included as one of "20 famous conspiracy theorists" alongside David Icke and Alex Jones in a newspaper article in 2024. He has faced strong criticism in Norway and been characterised by Norwegian media and other critics as a conman. Verrett has suggested that cancer is a matter of choice and has sold medallions said to ward off COVID-19, without any scientific evidence to support such claims. Verrett also claims to have been initiated spiritually by an American woman who calls herself "Princess Susana von Radić of Croatia", whom the fact-checking site Vantrú describes as "a fraud who claims to be a princess." Together, Märtha Louise and Verrett have organised seminars titled "The Princess and the Shaman," which also received widespread criticism.

In June 2022, Märtha Louise announced that she and Verrett were engaged. They married in a private ceremony on 31 August 2024 in Geiranger. Märtha Louise and Verrett sold the rights to the wedding to a British tabloid Hello!. Norwegian media described the wedding as "comical" and "embarrassing," sparking outrage over perceived greed and betrayal of Norwegian traditions and the taxpayers who fund the monarchy. The decision to conceal themselves in a plastic tent and behind a curtain to prevent anyone but photographers from Hello! magazine from capturing images of the wedding was widely criticised as a display of "shame and greed." At the ceremony, media reported that the king was made to wait in a car for 43 minutes. Norwegian media criticised Harald for legitimising and endorsing the exploitation of national values and symbols for Märtha Louise and Verrett's personal financial gain.

The newspaper iTromsø noted that Märtha Louise has faced extensive criticism for associating with a conspiracy theorist and her "commercialization and abuse of the title 'Princess'". Royal historian Trond Norén Isaksen said that "for the sake of the monarchy's integrity and reputation, it is absolutely necessary to sever the formal ties with Princess Märtha Louise" and that it is necessary "to revoke the princess title that Märtha Louise has exploited to its fullest extent. The royal family cannot be for sale." Bergens Tidende wrote that her title must be removed.

Märtha Louise's marriage to Verrett, who is a Black American, has generated controversy. She has accused former friends of racism for their criticism of Verrett. Verrett's sister, Demi DeLaNuit, criticised Märtha Louise for abusing her title to intimidate her. In November 2024, Norwegian media published recordings of Verrett where he admitted to sexual assault and "sucking the cock" of his clients during shamanistic sessions, and claimed that his wife knew about his actions.

Märtha Louise has rejected claims that Verrett did not grow up wealthy and said that people were jealous of his family's wealth. Royal correspondent Tove Taalsen questioned her emphasis on Verrett's alleged childhood wealth and wrote that it was out of touch with Norway's egalitarian values. Erik Stephansen, political editor of Nettavisen, criticised her complaints about media coverage of the couple and wrote that she had "actively sought the spotlight with her entire family, exploited the princess title in every conceivable way – including commercially – and is now fully engaged in milking her own glamorous celebrity wedding in Geiranger for all it's worth."

The royal family's association with Verrett has been cited as contributing to a deterioration in its reputation. Political scientist Torvald Valland Therkildsen described the royal family as a parody that is a source of embarrassment to Norway. In 2024, Norwegian media reported on a year-long reputation management project to improve Verrett's reputation and that Märtha Louise and Verrett had demanded the removal of a quote by Prime Minister Erna Solberg that described his views as "very strange" and linked to conspiratorial thought.

== Netflix documentary ==
Märtha Louise and Verrett were featured in the Netflix documentary Rebel Royals: An Unlikely Love Story, in which Verrett said he had not been welcomed with open arms by the royal family, and that King Harald, Queen Sonja, and Crown Prince Haakon "didn't know what racism was" and "looked at me as if I were crazy when I said that racism existed." Verrett said the first time that Harald asked about his experiences of racism was when Oprah with Meghan and Harry aired, and that "they didn't want a family discussion because they didn't want to treat me that way. They wanted to have a family discussion because they were afraid I might be the next one on Oprah." The royal family said the documentary violated Märtha Louise's and Verrett's agreement with the royal family not to use her title or connection to the monarchy.

== Bibliography ==
- Underveis : et portrett av prinsesse Märtha Louise, 2001, ISBN 9788252543711.
- Fra hjerte til hjerte ("From Heart to Heart"), 2002 in collaboration with husband Ari Behn, is a book about their wedding, ISBN 9788252543711.
- Why Kings and Queens Don't Wear Crowns, 2005 in collaboration with Svein Nyhus (Illustrator), ISBN 9781575340388.
- Eventyr fra jordens hjerte: Rodinia, 2007 (as editor) in collaboration with Kirsti Birkeland and Kristin Lyhmann (Editors), ISBN 9788292904008.
- Englenes hemmeligheter: Deres natur, språk og hvordan du åpner opp for dem, 2012 in collaboration with Elisabeth Nordeng, ISBN 9788202383152.

== Titles, styles, honours and arms ==
=== Titles and styles ===
- 1971–2002: Her Royal Highness Princess Märtha Louise of Norway
- 2002–present: Her Highness Princess Märtha Louise of Norway

On 8 November 2022, Märtha Louise announced that she will no longer have royal duties within the Norwegian royal house but will retain the title of Princess of Norway.

=== Honours ===
Royal monogram

==== National ====
- Norway: Grand Cross with Collar of the Order of Saint Olav
- Norway: Dame of the Royal Family Decoration of King Olav V of Norway
- Norway: Dame of the Royal Family Decoration of King Harald V of Norway
- Norway: Recipient of the Medal of the 100th Anniversary of the Birth of King Haakon VII
- Norway: Recipient of the King Olav V Silver Jubilee Medal
- Norway: Recipient of the King Olav V Commemorative Medal
- Norway: Recipient of the Medal of the 100th Anniversary of the Birth of King Olav V
- Norway: Recipient of the Royal House Centennial Medal
- Norway: Recipient of the King Harald V Silver Jubilee Medal

==== Foreign ====
- Denmark: Knight of the Order of the Elephant
- Finland: Grand Cross of the Order of the White Rose
- Iceland: Grand Cross of the Order of the Falcon
- Jordan: Grand Cordon of the Order of the Star of Jordan
- Netherlands: Grand Cross of the Order of the Crown (Note: Not a state decoration but a personal gift from Queen Beatrix.)
- Luxembourg: Grand Cross of the Order of Adolphe of Nassau
- Portugal: Grand Cross of the Order of Prince Henry
- Spain: Dame Grand Cross of the Order of Civil Merit
- Sweden: Commander Grand Cross of the Royal Order of the Polar Star
- Sweden: Recipient of the 50th Birthday Medal of King Carl XVI Gustaf
- Sweden: Recipient of the 70th Birthday Medal of King Carl XVI Gustaf

== Notes ==
Princess Märtha Louise of Norway House of Glücksburg Born: 22 September 1971
Lines of succession
Preceded by Prince Sverre Magnus of Norway	Succession to the Norwegian throne 3rd position	Succeeded by Maud Angelica Behn
