= Molkom =

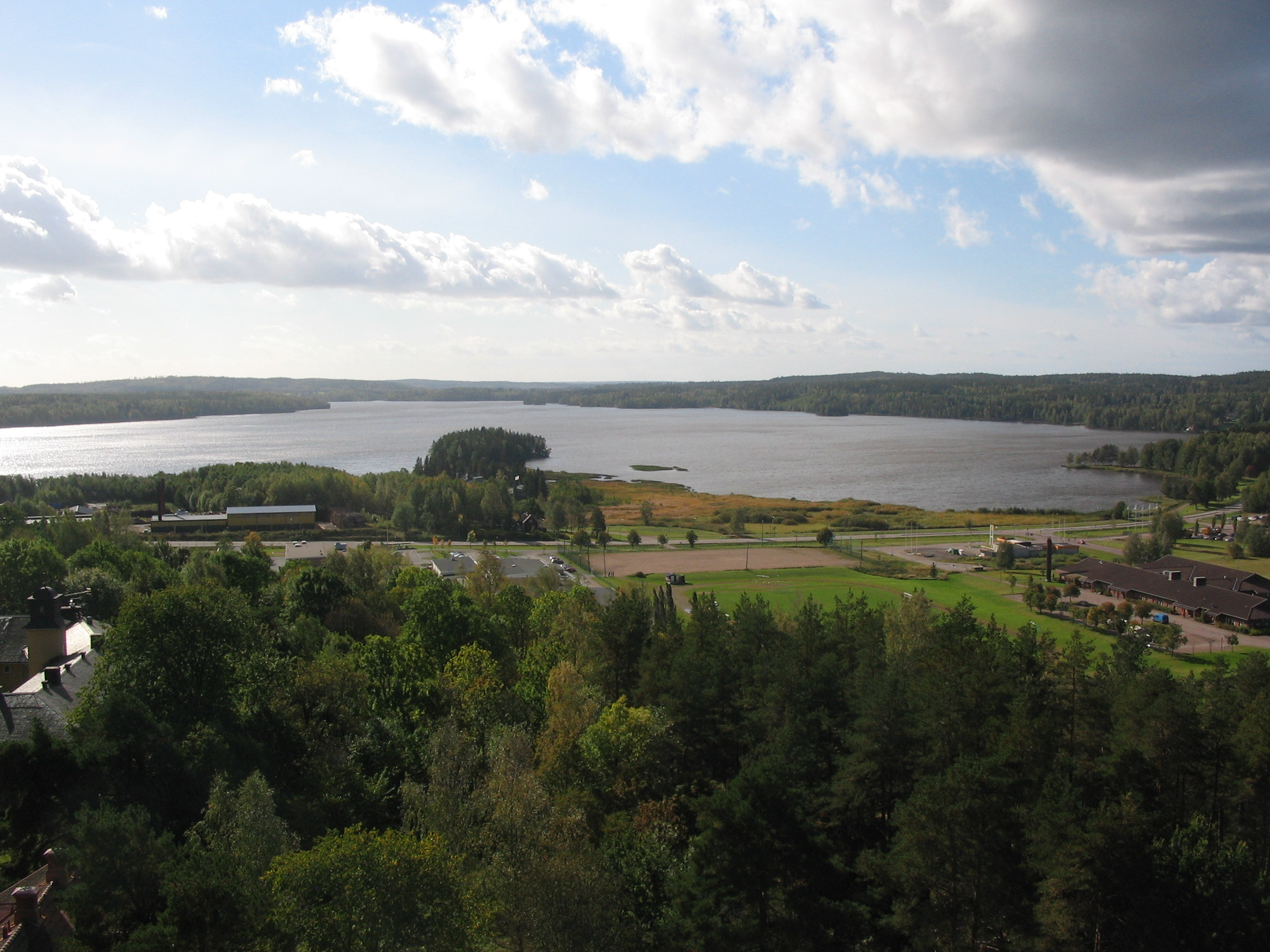

- Location within Sweden
- Coordinates: 59°36′N 13°43′E
- Country: Sweden
- Province: Värmland
- County: Värmland County
- Municipality: Karlstad Municipality

Area
  - Total: 2.43 km^{2} (0.94 sq mi)

Population (31 December 2010)
  - Total: 1,863
  - Density: 768/km^{2} (1,990/sq mi)
- Time zone: UTC+1 (CET)
  - Summer (DST): UTC+2 (CEST)

Molkom (Swedish pronunciation: [ˈmɔ̂lːkɔm]) is a locality situated in Karlstad Municipality, Värmland County, Sweden with 1,863 inhabitants in 2010.
