= Lommedalen =

- Village
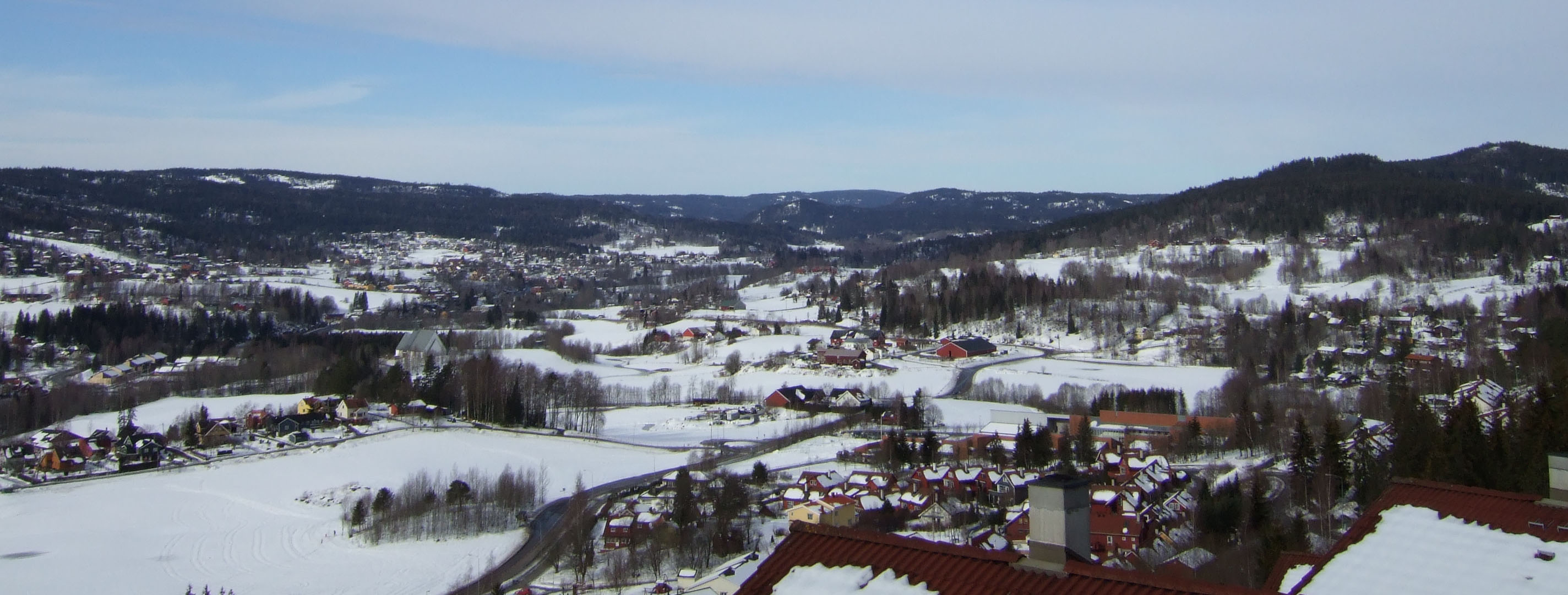
- Late winter vista of Lommedalen

- Location in Akershus
- Coordinates: 59°57′N 10°28′E
- Country: Norway
- County: Akershus
- Municipality: Bærum

Population
  - Total: 3,000
- Time zone: UTC+1 (CET)
  - Summer (DST): UTC+2 (CEST)
- Postal code: 1350

Lommedalen is a rural community in a small valley in Bærum municipality in the county of Akershus, Norway. The population is about 3,000 people. Lommedalen valley opens up at Bærums Verk and runs about 5 kilometers to the north.

Lommedalen includes wooded areas, some agricultural land, and residential zones. It includes parts of the forest area Krokskogen. The river Lomma runs through the valley. A forest road from Lommedalen goes to Hole in Buskerud. The pilgrim road to Nidaros Cathedral in Trondheim passed through Lommedalen in medieval times and was resurrected in celebration of the 1000th anniversary of Trondheim in 1997.

Lommedalen is a popular area for skiing and slalom in winter time and horseback riding in summer time. Lake Burudvann is a popular hiking destinations and seaside resort located in the area. The area is also home to two golf courses, Lommedalen Golf Club and Bærum Golf Club. Lommedalsbanen is a narrow gauge railway museum located at the top of the valley. Lommedalen church (Lommedalen kirke) dates from 1995. The building material is stone and brick. The church is of rectangular plan and 700 number of seats.

== People associated with Lommedalen ==
- Ari Behn (1972–2019), author and ex-husband of Princess Märtha Louise, and their children Maud Angelica, Leah Isadora and Emma Tallulah.
- Narve Bonna (1901–1976) ski jumper
- Magnus Carlsen (b. 1990) chess player
- Leif Kristian Haugen (b. 1987) World Cup alpine ski racer
- Aleksander Aamodt Kilde (b. 1992) World Cup alpine ski racer
- Thomas Rogne (b. 1990) football (soccer) player
- Rune Velta (b. 1989) ski jumper.

== Gallery ==
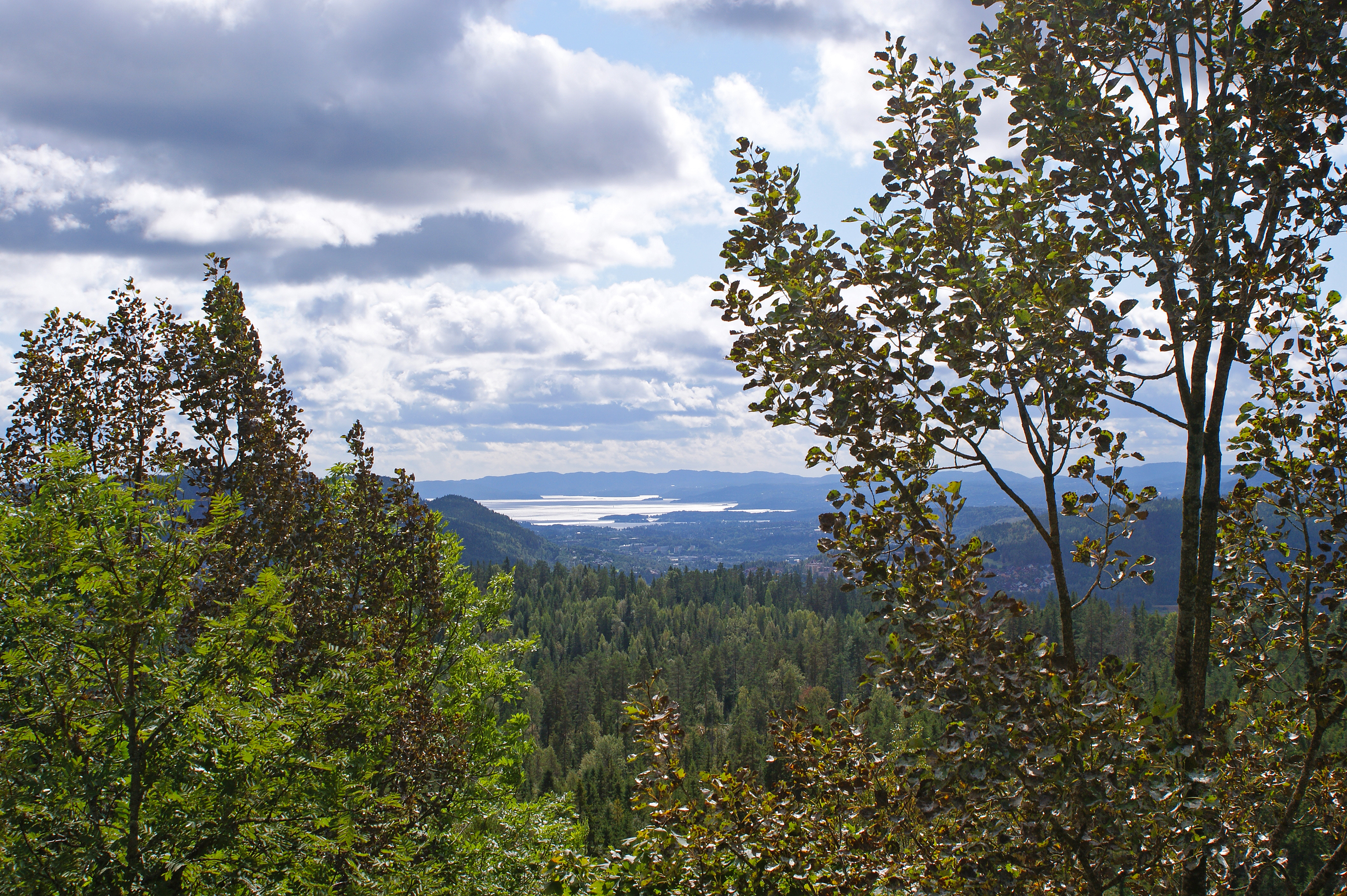
View of Lommedalen

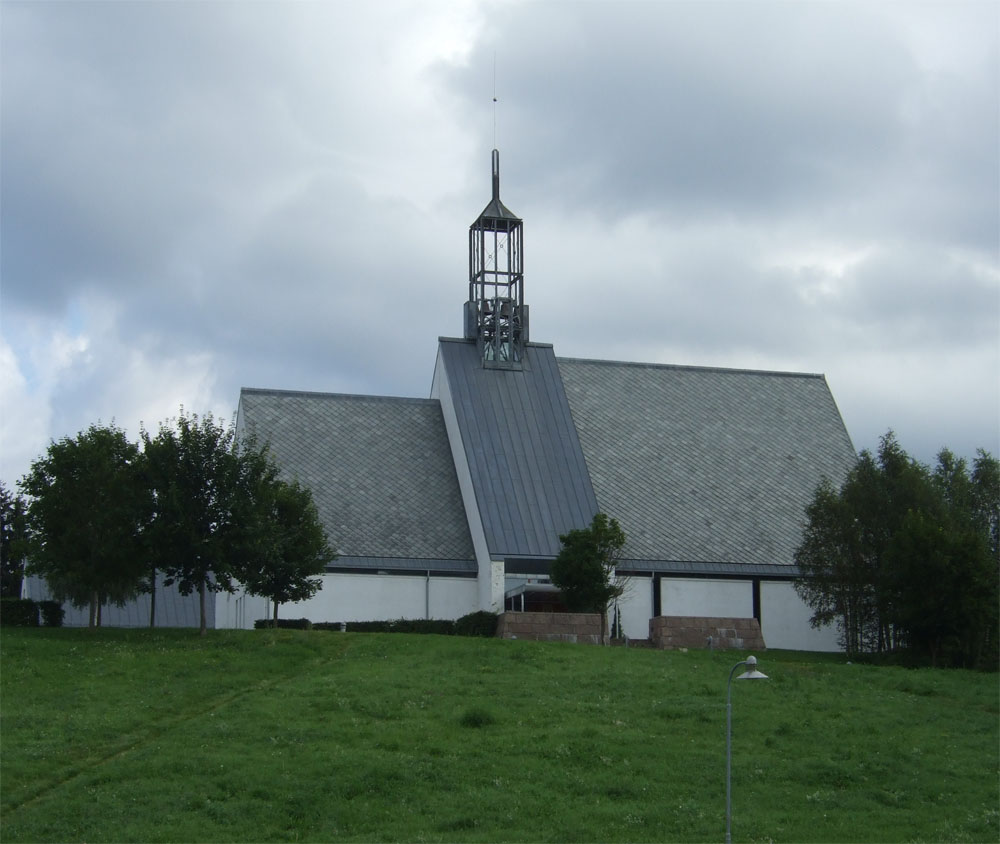
Lommedalen Church

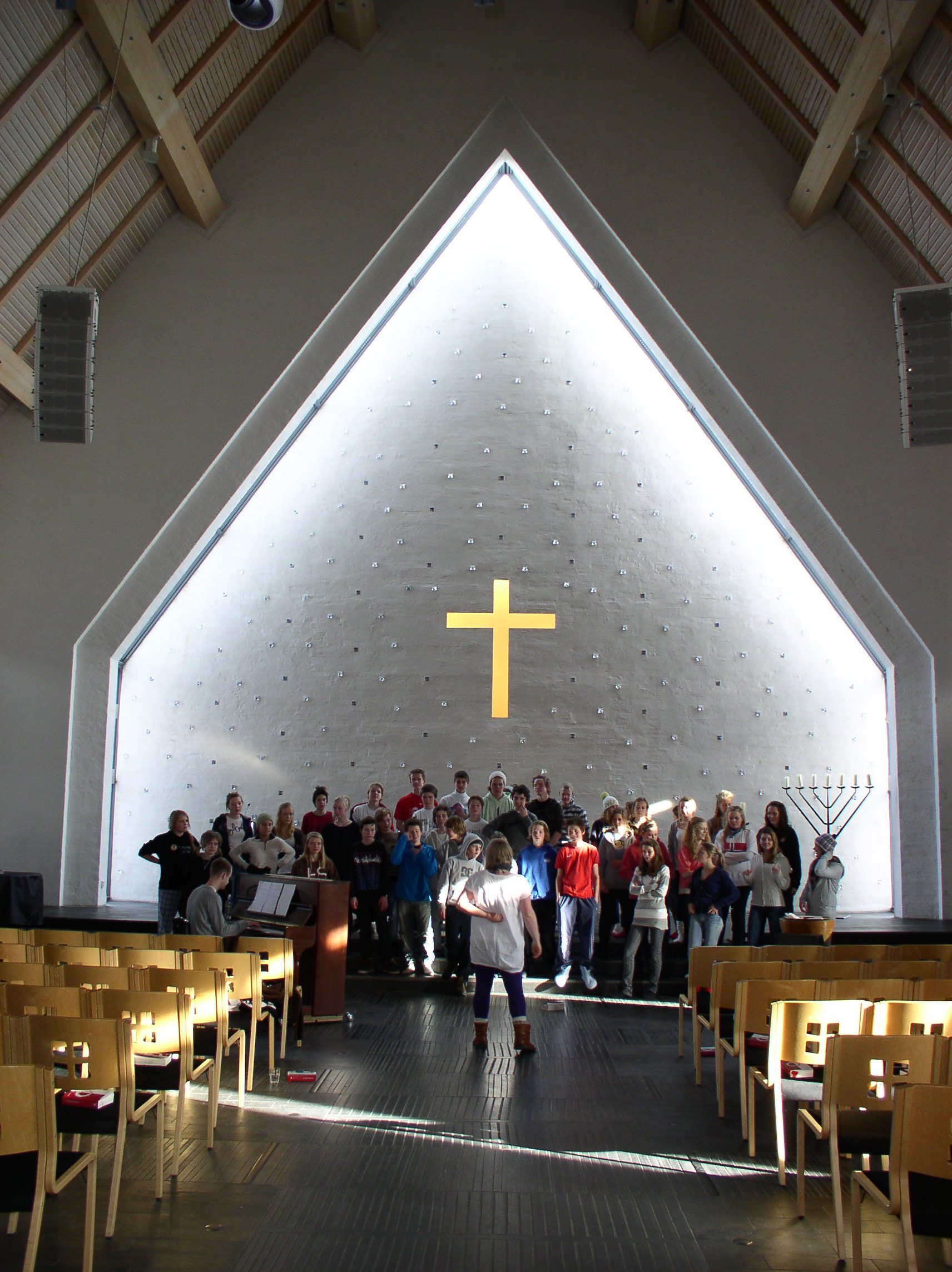
Lommedalen Church interior

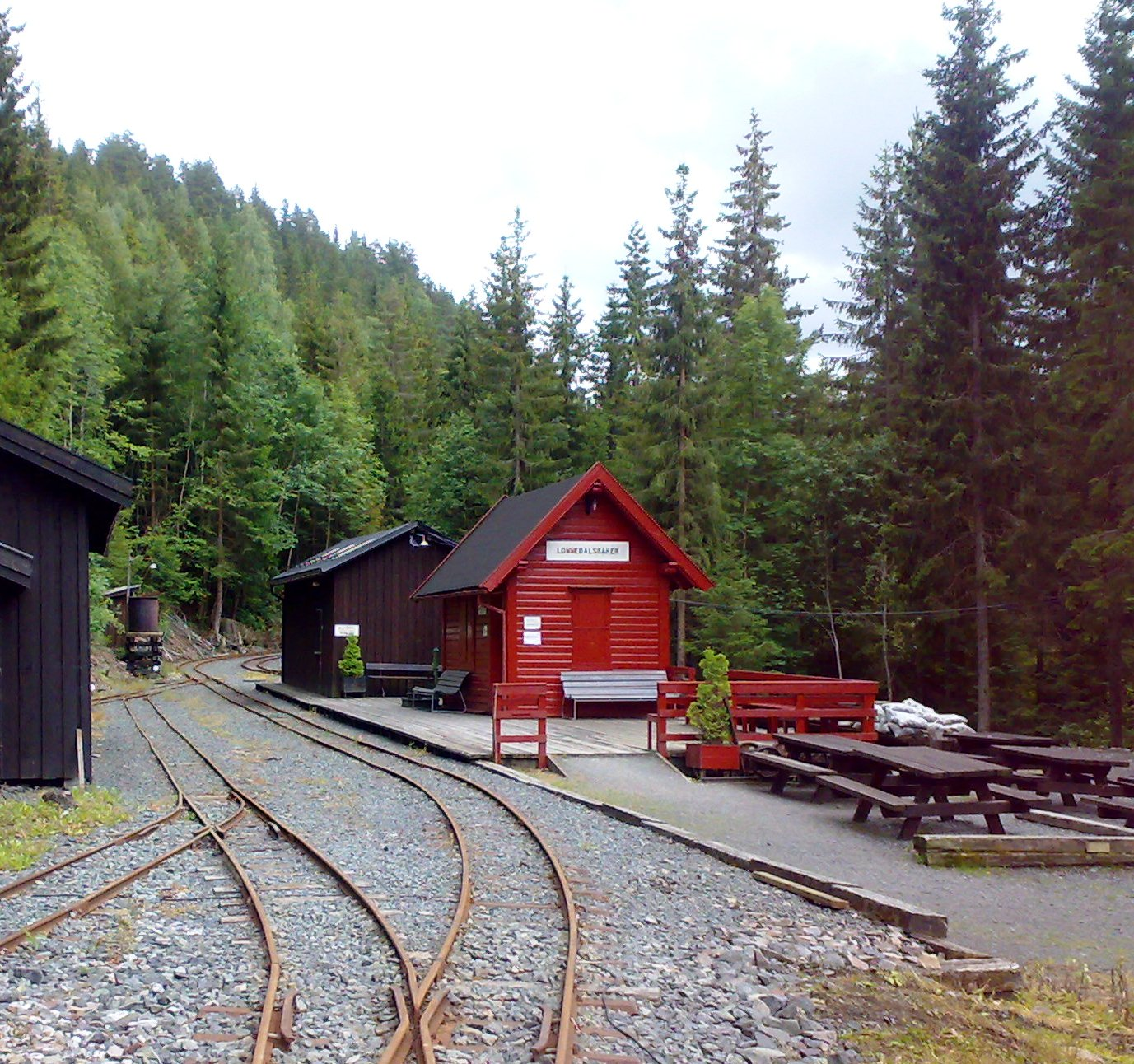
Lommedalsbanen
