= Death and state funeral of Harald V =

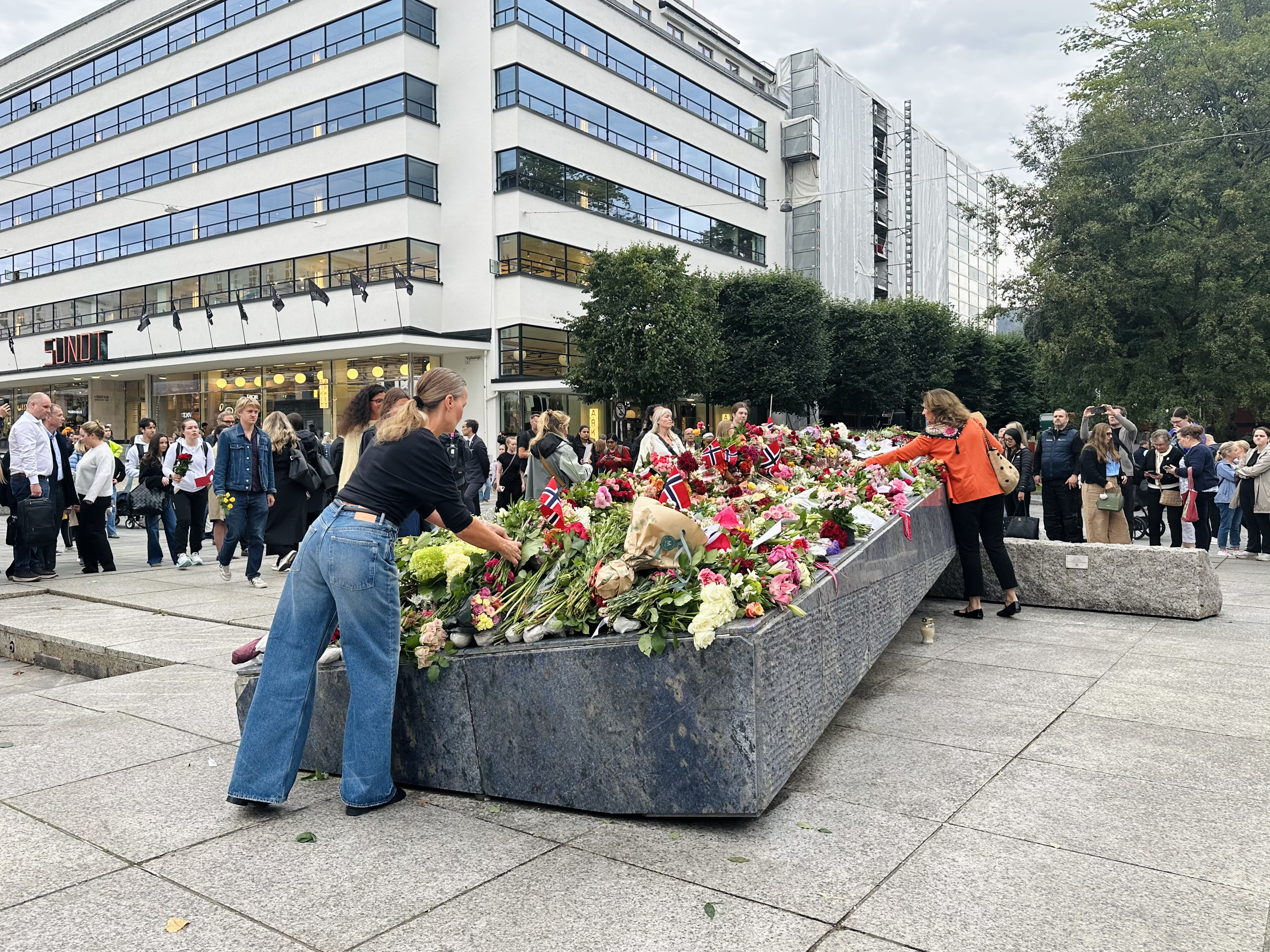
- Top to bottom, left to right: Procession of King Harald's coffin; Norwegian flags at half-mast in Arendal; Flowers being laid at The Blue Stone, Bergen; Gardeners of the Royal Palace arranging tributes left by mourners Flags at half-mast down Karl Johans gate, Oslo
- Date: 28 August 2026 (death); 9 September 2026 (state funeral)
- Time: 06:35 (CEST) (death); 13:00 (CEST) (state funeral)
- Location: Rikshospitalet, Oslo, Norway (death); Slottskapellet, Oslo (lying in state); Oslo Cathedral (state funeral); Akershus Fortress, Oslo (burial)

Harald V, King of Norway, died at Oslo University Hospital Rikshospitalet on 28 August 2026, at the age of 89. Harald had been admitted to the hospital since 17 August and was being treated for hemolytic anemia and a bloodstream infection. He was succeeded by his son, Crown Prince Haakon, who became King Haakon VIII.

Harald lay in state at the Slottskapellet from 31 August to 8 September. His state funeral took place on 9 September at Oslo Cathedral, followed by a procession to Akershus Fortress for private interment in the Royal Mausoleum. The service was attended by members of the Norwegian royal family, Norwegian government, foreign royal families, and foreign heads of state, government and diplomatic missions.

== Background ==
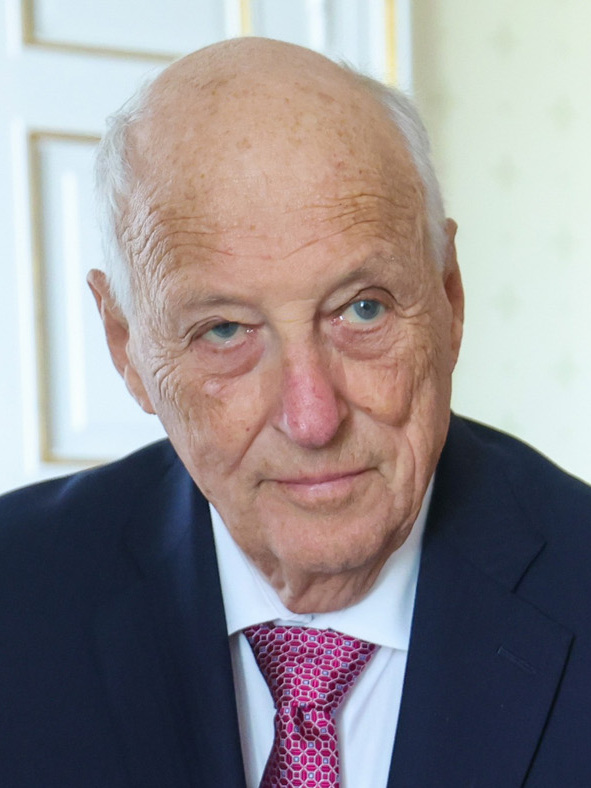
Harald in May 2026

In 1991, Harald became King of Norway at the age of 53 following the death of his father, Olav V. Since the early 2000s, he had experienced chronic health issues. He was diagnosed with bladder cancer in 2003, and in 2005 he underwent heart surgery. In 2020, he underwent heart surgery again to replace the artificial heart valve he had received at his previous operation.

He had a leg operation in January 2022. Harald was hospitalised in August with a fever and again in December for an infection, and was admitted once more in May 2023 shortly before Constitution Day. He tested positive for coronavirus in March 2022 and again in October 2023. In January 2024, the Royal House announced that he was on sick leave due to a respiratory infection.

While on holiday in Malaysia in February 2024, Harald was hospitalised in Langkawi with a low heart rate and had a temporary pacemaker implanted. He was discharged on 3 March and transported back to Norway on a medical evacuation flight, after which he was placed on two weeks' sick leave. He received a permanent pacemaker on 12 March and was discharged two days later.

In February 2026, he was hospitalised while on holiday in Tenerife with his wife, Queen Sonja, and treated for a skin infection on his leg.

Prior to his death, Harald had been scheduled to visit the municipalities of Rindal, Høylandet, Siljan, and Nissedal in September and October 2026. These were the only municipalities he had not yet visited in an official capacity during his reign. He did not intend to abdicate, arguing that he had taken a lifelong constitutional oath before the Storting when he acceded the throne in 1991.

== Final hospitalisation and death ==
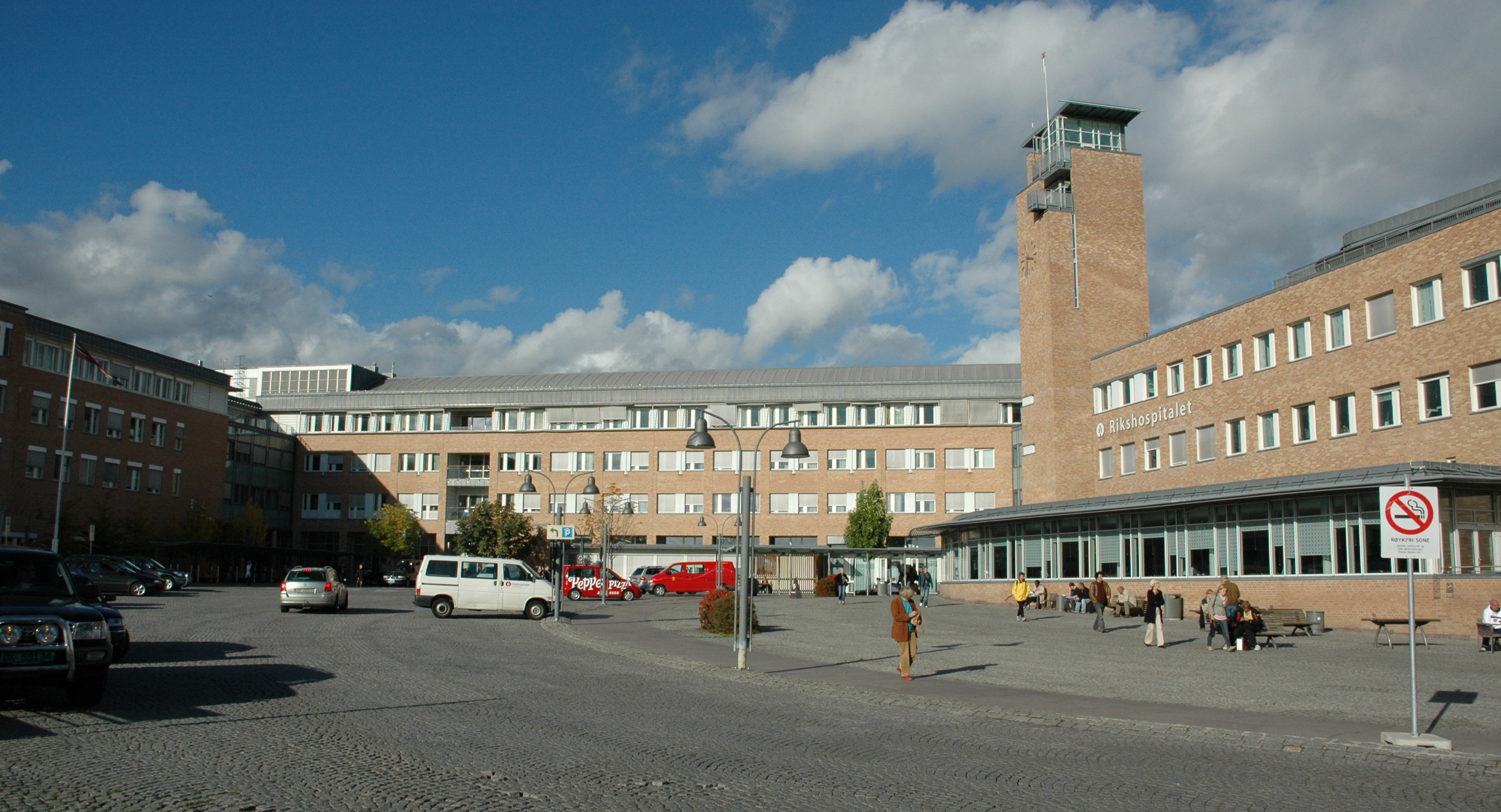
Harald died at Oslo University Hospital Rikshospitalet, where he had been admitted ten days earlier.

On 17 August 2026, Harald was admitted to Oslo University Hospital Rikshospitalet with fluid retention caused by cortisone treatment for hemolytic anaemia and was placed on two weeks' sick leave. His son, Crown Prince Haakon, was designated regent during his hospitalisation. On 24 August, the Royal House said his condition had worsened and that he was receiving antibiotics for a bloodstream infection.

On 27 August, the Royal House announced that his condition had become "extremely serious" and that Haakon and Queen Sonja had cancelled all of their engagements. It was also reported that members of the family were visiting the hospital to be at his bedside. The Royal House later stated that his condition had remained unchanged. In response to the news, several officials cancelled or curtailed their travels, including President of the Storting Masud Gharahkhani, Prime Minister Jonas Gahr Støre, President of the Sámi Parliament Silje Karine Muotka, and the country's bishops, who were on a study trip to Rome.

External media
- Announcement of the death of Harald V on NRK Radio (in Norwegian)

Harald died at the hospital at 06:35 (CEST) on 28 August, aged 89. The Royal House announced his death at 08:35.

== Succession ==
Haakon VIII on the day he swore his oath to the Constitution before the Storting

Upon Harald's death, his son Haakon immediately ascended the throne as King of Norway. On the same day, he met his government ministers for an extraordinary Council of State where he announced Haakon VIII as his regnal name, and renewed the "Alt for Norge" motto as his own royal motto; all monarchs since Haakon VII have used the same motto. He took the oath to the Constitution before the Storting in a ceremony on 1 September.

== National mourning ==
A period of national mourning was declared leading up to the day of his funeral. King Haakon VIII declared a period of court mourning, during which most of the royal family's engagements were cancelled, lasting until 9 October, one month after the funeral.

On 30 August, memorial services were held in churches throughout Norway. The royal family attended a service at Asker Church, near the royal estate of Skaugum.

=== Lying in state ===
On the evening of 28 August, Harald's coffin was taken from the hospital to the Royal Palace. More than an estimated 10,000 people lined the streets of Oslo with flowers, Norwegian flags, and cards. Upon arrival at the palace, it was placed in the Red Salon.

On 31 August, Harald's coffin, draped in the royal standard, was carried by his children and grandchildren in procession from the Red Salon to the Slottskapellet, the chapel of the Royal Palace. The crown and the royal sword were carried before the coffin while the insignia of the king's Norwegian, British, Danish and Swedish honours were carried on cushions in the procession. At the end of the procession, the crown and sword were placed on the coffin and the insignia were placed at its foot. The bier was surrounded by candelabra and floral tributes from Harald's family.

Harald lay in state in the chapel from 31 August until the morning of the funeral. The coffin was guarded by cadets from the Norwegian Military Academy, Royal Norwegian Air Force Academy and Royal Norwegian Naval Academy. The chapel opened to members of the public for viewing from 14:00 on 1 September and remained open daily until 8 September.

== State funeral ==
View of mourners at Torggata near Oslo Cathedral, some from the roofs.

=== Procession to Oslo Cathedral ===
At 12:00 (CEST) on 9 September, Harald's body was moved from the Slottskapellet in procession down Karl Johans gate to Oslo Cathedral on a gun carriage pulled by a Mercedes-Benz G-Class, flanked by members of the King's adjutant staff. The procession was led by mounted police, His Majesty the King's Guard, the Norwegian Army Band and the Lord Chamberlain. The King, Crown Princess, Prince Sverre Magnus, Princess Märtha Louise and foreign dignitaries walked behind. The Queen and Queen Sonja followed immediately behind the Norwegian royal family by car. During the procession, a 21-gun salute was fired from all of the Norwegian Armed Forces' designated saluting locations across the country, including Akershus Fortress.

=== Funeral service ===
Harald's state funeral took place at Oslo Cathedral on 9 September 2026 at 13:00. The service followed the funeral liturgy of the Church of Norway and was presided over by the Preses of the Bishops' Conference, Olav Fykse Tveit, assisted by the Bishop of Oslo, Sunniva Gylver.

Harald was eulogised by Gharahkhani and Prime Minister Støre. A candle was lit by representatives of different faiths. The sermon was given by the Preses. The first lesson, taken from the Gospel of John, was read in Northern Sámi by the vice chair of the Sami Church Council, Mathis Eira. The second lesson, taken from the First Epistle to the Corinthians, was read by Norwegian actor Ameli Isungset Agbota. The Prayer of Saint Francis was read in Swedish by Harald's goddaughter Crown Princess Victoria of Sweden.

Music was performed throughout the service. It included the hymns "No stig vår song", composed for Harald and Sonja's 70th birthdays in 2007 by Norwegian lyricist Edvard Hoem and composer Håkon Berge, "Deilig er jorden", and the English hymn "Abide with Me"; the Norwegian folk songs "Eg veit i himmerik ei borg" and "Jørgen Hattemaker", the latter by Alf Prøysen and Bjarne Amdahl; and choral settings of Psalm 121 by Arild Sandvold and the Nunc dimittis by Kjell Habbestad. Two additional pieces were composed for the service by cathedral cantor Marcus André Berg. The royal anthem was also sung.

After the service, Harald's coffin was transported in procession to Akershus Fortress for private burial in the Royal Mausoleum.

=== Dignitaries ===
Prince Sverre Magnus, King Haakon VIII, Crown Princess Ingrid Alexandra and Princess Märtha Louise at the funeral

Countries with diplomatic representation in Norway and all members of the Storting were invited to attend the funeral.

==== Norwegian guests ====
===== Royal family and relatives =====
- Queen Sonja, the late King's widow
  - The King and Queen, the late King's son and daughter-in-law
    - The Crown Princess, the late King's granddaughter
    - Prince Sverre Magnus, the late King's grandson
  - Princess Märtha Louise and Durek Verrett, the late King's daughter and son-in-law
    - Maud Angelica Behn, the late King's granddaughter
    - Leah Isadora Behn, the late King's granddaughter
    - Emma Tallulah Behn, the late King's granddaughter
- The late Princess Ragnhild, Mrs. Lorentzen's family:
  - Haakon and Martha Lorentzen, the late King's nephew and his wife
- Princess Astrid, Mrs. Ferner, the late King's sister
  - Cathrine and Arild Johansen, the late King's niece and her husband
    - Sebastian Ferner Johansen and Belinda Lundstrom, the late King's grandnephew and his partner
  - Benedikte Ferner and Aage Hvinden, the late King's niece and her partner
  - Alexander Ferner, the late King's nephew
  - Elisabeth and Tom Beckmann, the late King's niece and her husband
  - Carl Christian Ferner, the late King's nephew

Harald's funeral was Princess Astrid's final public engagement, having died on 11 September.

====== Tjessem-Høiby family ======
- Marit Tjessem, mother of the late King's daughter-in-law
  - Marius Borg Høiby, the late King's step-grandson
  - Espen and Renate Høiby, brother and sister-in-law of the late King's daughter-in-law
  - Per Høiby and Louise Kathrine Dedichen, brother and sister-in-law of the late King's daughter-in-law
  - Kristin Høiby, sister of the late King's daughter-in-law

Marius Borg Høiby, who had been sentenced in June 2026 to a four-year prison sentence for rape and was under house arrest pending an appeal, was allowed by a court to attend the funeral.

====== Haraldsen family ======
- Karl Otto Haraldsen, the late King's nephew
- Marianne Haraldsen, the late King's niece
- Lis Dagny Haraldsen Magnus, the late King's niece

====== Verrett family ======
- Brandon Clarke, brother of the late King's son-in-law
- Angelina Verrett-Byrne, sister of the late King's son-in-law
  - Lucas Byrne, nephew of the late King's son-in-law

====== Other relatives ======
- Count Axel and Countess Jutta of Rosenborg, the late King's first cousin once removed and his wife
  - Count Carl Johan and Countess Sidsel of Rosenborg, the late King's first cousin twice removed and his wife
- Count Carl Johan and Countess Vanessa of Rosenborg, the late King's first cousin once removed and his wife
- Madeleine Kogevinas and Bernhard Mach, the late King's first cousin and her partner
  - Countess Marie-Christine Ullens de Schooten, the late King's first cousin once removed
  - Désirée Kogevinas, the late King's first cousin once removed

===== Politicians =====
- Jonas Gahr Støre, Prime Minister of Norway
  - Erna Solberg, Prime Minister of Norway (2013–2021)
  - Jens Stoltenberg, Prime Minister of Norway (2000–2001; 2005–2013) and Minister of Finance (1996–1997; since 2025)
  - Kjell Magne Bondevik, Prime Minister of Norway (1997–2000; 2001–2005)
  - Gro Harlem Brundtland, Prime Minister of Norway (1981; 1986–1989; 1990–1996)
- Espen Barth Eide, Minister of Foreign Affairs
- Jon-Ivar Nygård, Minister of Transport
- Lubna Jaffery, Minister of Culture and Equality
- Dag-Inge Ulstein, Leader of the Christian Democratic Party
- Anne Lindboe, Mayor of Oslo
  - Fabian Stang, Mayor of Oslo (2007–2015)

====== Members of the Storting ======
- Masud Gharahkhani (Buskerud), president of the Storting
- Ove Bernt Trellevik (Hordaland), third vice president of the Storting
- Alf Erik Andersen (Vest-Agder), fourth vice president of the Storting
- Ingrid Fiskaa (Rogaland), fifth vice president of the Storting
- Hashim Abdi (Østfold)
- Henrik Asheim (Akershus), deputy leader of the Conservative Party
- Kirsti Bergstø (Akershus), leader of the Socialist Left Party
- Trond Giske (Sør-Trøndelag)
- Trond Helleland (Buskerud), deputy leader of the Conservative Party in the Storting
- Marian Abdi Hussein (Oslo), deputy leader of the Socialist Left Party
- Ingrid Liland (Oslo), second deputy leader of the Green Party
- Sylvi Listhaug (Møre og Romsdal), leader of the Opposition and leader of the Progress Party
- Guri Melby (Oslo), leader of the Liberal Party
- Linda Monsen Merkesdal (Hordaland)
- Sverre Myrli (Akershus)
- Mona Nilsen (Nordland)
- Ida Lindtveit Røse (Akershus), leader of the Christian Democratic Party in the Storting
- Hanne Stenvaag (Troms)
- Ine Eriksen Søreide (Oslo), leader of the Conservative Party

====== Members of the Sámi Parliament ======
- Silje Karine Muotka, President of the Sámi Parliament
  - Vibeke Larsen, President of the Sámi Parliament (2016–2017)
  - Egil Olli, President of the Sámi Parliament (2007–2013)
  - Sven-Roald Nystø, President of the Sámi Parliament (1997–2005)
  - Ole Henrik Magga, President of the Sámi Parliament (1989–1997)
- Elisabeth Erke, member for Østre
- Sandra Márjá West, member for Gáisi

===== Other =====
- Tove Linnea Brandvik, Chairwoman of the Norwegian Forum of Disabled Peoples' Organizations
- Rebecka Ekeland, head of the youth branch of the Norwegian Kven Organization
- Siri Hatlen, President of the Norwegian Red Cross
- Gjermund Larsen, musician
- Harald Stanghelle, former editor-in-chief of Aftenposten
- Toril Marie Øie, Chief Justice of the Supreme Court

==== Foreign dignitaries ====
===== Foreign royalty =====
====== Members of reigning royal families ======
- The King and Queen of the Belgians
- The King and Queen of Denmark
  - The Crown Prince of Denmark
- Princess Benedikte of Denmark
- The Crown Prince and Crown Princess of Japan (representing the Emperor of Japan)
- The King and Queen of Jordan
- The Hereditary Prince and Hereditary Princess of Liechtenstein (representing the Prince of Liechtenstein)
- Grand Duke Henri of Luxembourg
  - The Grand Duke and Grand Duchess of Luxembourg
- The Prince and Princess of Monaco
- Princess Beatrix of the Netherlands
  - The King and Queen of the Netherlands
    - The Princess of Orange
- Prince Turki bin Mohammed of Saudi Arabia (representing the King of Saudi Arabia)
- Queen Sofía of Spain
  - The King and Queen of Spain
- The King and Queen of Sweden
  - The Crown Princess and Prince Daniel of Sweden
  - Prince Carl Philip and Princess Sofia of Sweden
  - Princess Madeleine and Christopher O'Neill
- Princess Christina, Mrs. Magnuson, and Tord Magnuson
- Sheikh Nahyan bin Mubarak Al Nahyan (representing the President of the United Arab Emirates)
- The Prince of Wales (representing the King of the United Kingdom)
- The Princess Royal

====== Members of non-reigning royal families ======
- The Prince of Preslav and Katharine Butler
- The Princess of Preslav
- Queen Anne-Marie of Greece
  - Princess Alexia of Greece and Denmark and Carlos Morales Quintana
  - Crown Prince Pavlos of Greece
  - Prince Nikolaos of Greece and Denmark
- Crown Prince Alexander and Crown Princess Katherine of Serbia and Yugoslavia
- Princess Alexandra of Sayn-Wittgenstein-Berleburg

===== Other heads of state =====
- Bajram Begaj, President of the Republic of Albania, and First Lady Armanda Begaj
- Petr Pavel, President of the Czech Republic
- Alar Karis, President of the Republic of Estonia, and First Lady Sirje Karis
- Alexander Stubb, President of the Republic of Finland, and First Lady Suzanne Innes-Stubb
- Mikheil Kavelashvili, President of the Republic of Georgia, (Note: Position disputed with outgoing president Salome Zourabichvili since 2024.) and First Lady Tamar Bagrationi
- Frank-Walter Steinmeier, Federal President of the Federal Republic of Germany, and First Lady Elke Büdenbender
- Konstantinos Tasoulas, President of the Hellenic Republic
- András Baka, President of the Republic of Hungary
- Halla Tómasdóttir, President of Iceland, and First Gentleman Björn Skúlason
- Catherine Connolly, President of Ireland
- Edgars Rinkēvičs, President of the Republic of Latvia
- Gitanas Nausėda, President of the Republic of Lithuania, and First Lady Diana Nausėdienė
- Maia Sandu, President of the Republic of Moldova
- Karol Nawrocki, President of the Republic of Poland
- Nataša Pirc Musar, President of the Republic of Slovenia, and First Gentleman Aleš Musar
- Volodymyr Zelenskyy, President of Ukraine, and First Lady Olena Zelenska

===== Prime Ministers =====
- Mette Frederiksen, Prime Minister of Denmark
- Sébastien Lecornu, Prime Minister of France
- Aziz Akhannouch, Prime Minister of Morocco
- Ulf Kristersson, Prime Minister of Sweden
- Anutin Charnvirakul, Prime Minister of Thailand

===== Other foreign representatives =====
- Christine Schwarz-Fuchs, President of the Federal Council of Austria
- Louise Arbour, Governor General of Canada
- Gordan Grlić-Radman, Minister of Foreign and European Affairs of Croatia
- Samuel Okudzeto Ablakwa, Minister for Foreign Affairs of Ghana
- Cardinal Christophe Pierre (representing the Pope)
- Giancarlo Giorgetti, Minister of Economy and Finance of Italy
- Ervin Ibrahimović, Vice President of the Parliament of Montenegro
- Aleem Khan, Minister of Communications of Pakistan
- Paulo Rangel, Minister of Foreign Affairs of Portugal
- Oana Țoiu, Minister of Foreign Affairs of Romania
- Marko Đurić, Minister of Foreign Affairs of Serbia
- Tomáš Taraba, Deputy Prime Minister of Slovakia
- Nam In-soon, Deputy Speaker of the National Assembly of South Korea
- Viola Amherd, former President of the Swiss Confederation
- Mohamed Ali Nafti, Minister of Foreign Affairs of Tunisia
- Mehmet Kemal Bozay, Vice Minister of Foreign Affairs of Turkey
- Allison Hooker, Under Secretary of State for Political Affairs of the United States

===== Diplomatic representatives =====
- Feriel Ryma Yousfi-Ighil, Ambassador of Algeria to Norway
- Alcino Isata Conceição, Ambassador of Angola to Norway
- Claudio Giacomino, Ambassador of Argentina to Norway
- David Matthew Vosen, Ambassador of Australia to Norway
- Hoda Dedić, Ambassador of Bosnia and Herzegovina to Norway
- Rodrigo de Azeredo Santos, Ambassador of Brazil to Norway
- Hellmut Lagos Koller, Ambassador of Chile to Norway
- Zhou Jingxing, Ambassador of China to Norway
- Luis Dimaté, Ambassador of Colombia to Norway
- Hugo René Ramos Milanés, Ambassador of Cuba to Norway
- Doros Venezis, Ambassador of Cyprus of Norway
- Gamal Metwally, Ambassador of Egypt to Norway
- Claudia Beatriz del Carmen Beltrán Gálvez, Ambassador of El Salvador to Norway
- Peter Van Kemseke, Ambassador of the European Union to Norway
- Archbishop Julio Murat, Apostolic Nuncio to Norway
- Gloria Gangte, Ambassador of India to Norway
- Teuku Faizasyah, Ambassador of Indonesia to Norway
- Ali Reza Jahangiri, Ambassador of Iran to Norway
- Yassin Mohammed Karim Al-Rahmani, Ambassador of Iraq to Norway
- Eytan Halon, Israeli chargé d'affaires in Norway
- Adil Tursunov, Ambassador of Kazakhstan to Norway
- Nita Luci, Ambassador of Kosovo to Norway
- Nts'ebo Moshoeshoe, Ambassador of Lesotho to Norway
- Marlene Mizzi, Ambassador of Malta of Norway
- Omar Fayad Meneses, Ambassador of Mexico to Norway
- Yin Po Myat, Burmese chargé d'affaires of Norway
- Driton Kuqi, Ambassador of North Macedonia to Norway
- Marie Antoinette Sedin, Ambassador of Palestine of Norway
- Rolando Ruiz Rosas Cateriano, Ambassador of Peru to Norway
- Enrico Fos, Ambassador of the Philippines to Norway
- Fatima Al-Mohannadi, First Secretary of the Embassy of Qatar of Norway
- Nikolay Korchunov, Ambassador of Russia to Norway
- Delores Camilla Kotzé, Ambassador of South Africa to Norway
- Kamal Bashir Ahmed Mohamed Khair, Ambassador of Sudan to Norway
- Le Thi Thu, Ambassador of Vietnam to Norway

==== Religious figures ====
===== Church of Norway =====
- Olav Fykse Tveit, Preses of the Bishops' Conference of the Church of Norway
- Harald Hegstad, Leader of the National Church Council of the Church of Norway
- Sunniva Gylver, Bishop of Oslo

===== Catholic Church =====
- Fredrik Hansen, Bishop of Oslo

===== Other =====
- Christian Lomsdalen, President of the Norwegian Humanist Association
- Joav Melchior, chief rabbi for Oslo
- Faruk Terzic, imam and President of the Muslim Dialogue Network
- Changchub Tsering, chief lama of Karma Tashi Ling
- Commissioner Knud Welander, leader of the Salvation Army in Norway

==== Absences ====
- Queen Margrethe II of Denmark was invited and was initially scheduled to attend. After being admitted to Rigshospitalet in Copenhagen for an illness, her attendance was ultimately cancelled.
- All living former prime ministers of Norway attended the state funeral, with the exception of Thorbjørn Jagland who served as prime minister from 1996 to 1997. Jagland was reported to have been committed to a hospital since February 2026 amidst ongoing investigation regarding his relationship with Jeffrey Epstein; however, it is unclear if Jagland was invited to attend the funeral despite his condition.
- No invitations were sent to foreign representatives of Afghanistan, Myanmar, Russia and Sudan, although ambassadors of the latter three countries were present at the funeral.

== Reactions ==
=== Domestic ===
A digital billboard at Oslo Central Station showing a picture of King Harald on 29 August

Prime Minister Jonas Gahr Støre and other ministers signed a book of condolences at the Royal Palace. Støre said that the country was "united in grief and gratitude". Støre and Gharakhani both addressed the nation following Harald's death. Oslo mayor Anne Lindboe postponed her wedding ceremony to Pål Sandvid, which had been scheduled for 28 August.

The Football Association of Norway announced the postponement of matches in the top four men's divisions and the top three women's divisions for 48 hours. Footballer Erling Haaland, who had met with the king following Norway's participation in the 2026 FIFA World Cup, paid tribute to him on social media. Haaland and fellow Norwegian footballer Jørgen Strand Larsen later wore black mourning bands during a Crystal Palace vs Manchester City Premier League fixture.

On the day of Harald's death, members of the Norwegian cycling team Uno-X Mobility wore black mourning bands at Stage 7 of the 2026 Vuelta a España; a minute of silence was held before the stage began. Uno-X Mobility finished with a one-two result, with Andreas Leknessund winning the stage and Tobias Halland Johannessen placing second. After their victory, Leknessund said the day had been emotional and dedicated his win to the deceased king and to Norway.

The advertising agency JCDecaux's digital billboards in Norway replaced their regular advertisements with a tribute to Harald for 24 hours.

No prohibitions on cultural events were issued in the aftermath of his death, and some concerts and festivals scheduled for that weekend proceeded mostly as planned.

Acting Director of the Peace Research Institute Oslo Haakon Gjerløw expressed his condolences and "wish[ed] the Royal Family strength in the time ahead." University of Oslo Rector Ragnhild Hennum highlighted Harald's contributions to the university, including laying the stone of the University Library at Blindern and the annual awarding of His Majesty The King's Gold Medal.

=== International ===
==== Leaders ====
King Frederik X and Queen Mary of Denmark sent a letter of condolence to King Haakon VIII, in which Frederik referred to Harald as "Uncle Harald" and recalled the close relationship between the Norwegian and Danish royal families. They described Harald as a "strong unifying figure" during his reign and emphasised the longstanding ties between both countries. The King and Queen ordered flags at Amalienborg to be flown at half-mast on the day of his death. Prime Minister Mette Frederiksen said Harald was a "highly respected" figure who symbolised unity and continuity for Norway and the Nordic countries.

King Carl XVI Gustaf of Sweden announced a period of court mourning, with flags at Swedish royal palaces flown at half-mast. Crown Princess Victoria, who was Harald's godchild, released a statement calling him "an extraordinarily nice person" and "a role model". Swedish prime minister Ulf Kristersson described Harald as a "uniting force" among the Nordic countries. Swedish opposition leader Magdalena Andersson said Harald had been with Norwegians during their best and most difficult moments.

Finland's president Alexander Stubb said Harald would be remembered for his duties as head of state, his "ability to unite Norwegians", and his "commitment to maintaining hope and confidence". President of Iceland Halla Tomasdottir also expressed her condolences.

King Charles III expressed "profound sadness" at the death of his "dear cousin" and said Harald had served with dedication and guided Norway through periods of change with warmth and humility, and expressed condolences to Queen Sonja. The Union Flag was flown at half‑mast at major royal residences and UK Government buildings, and at British Armed Forces installations in recognition of Harald's honorary appointments in the British Armed Forces. Flags at civic offices in Epping Forest District were lowered, and the government of the Isle of Man recalled Harald and Sonja's 2002 visit. In Shetland, Deputy Convener Catherine Hughson and Lord Lieutenant Lindsay Tulloch expressed condolences, and Norwegian flags were flown at half-mast outside Lerwick Town Hall. Scotland's first minister John Swinney expressed condolences, and the government of Gibraltar flew flags at half-mast.

King Willem-Alexander, Queen Máxima, and Princess Beatrix of the Netherlands expressed condolences in a joint statement, noting Harald's dedication to Norway and "how he embraced the Netherlands and the Dutch people". King Philippe and Queen Mathilde of Belgium described him as a "reassuring presence". Guillaume V, Grand Duke of Luxembourg recalled Harald's reign and sailing career and said he remained true to his motto, "Alt for Norge".

King Felipe VI and Queen Letizia of Spain described Harald as "an example of dignity and simplicity". Prince Albert II of Monaco highlighted Harald's commitment to environmental protection and Olympic values.

Pope Leo XIV sent a telegram offering "prayers of eternal rest" for the late king. French president Emmanuel Macron recalled his state visit to Norway in 2025 and offered condolences. President of Germany Frank-Walter Steinmeier said Germany had lost a friend and Europe a reconciler. Chancellor Friedrich Merz described Harald as a "prudent" and "unifying" figure. Swiss president and federal councillor Guy Parmelin expressed condolences on behalf of the Federal Council. Austria's president Alexander Van der Bellen recalled Harald's "dedication" and "dignity". Italy's prime minister Giorgia Meloni said Harald strengthened ties between Norway and Italy. Portugal's president António José Seguro described Harald as a unifying figure and recalled his 2008 state visit to Portugal. President of Ireland Catherine Connolly said Harald would be remembered for his "public service on behalf of the Norwegian people and his inclusivity", and foreign minister Helen McEntee said he lived up to his motto, "Alt for Norge".

Hungary's president András Baka recalled Harald's "advocacy of European values". Czech president Petr Pavel recalled meeting Harald in 2015, and prime minister Andrej Babiš described him as "a respected statesman". Poland's president Karol Nawrocki extended condolences, and foreign minister Radosław Sikorski recalled Harald's state visits in 1996 and 2012. Slovakia's president Peter Pellegrini described Harald as a "steady presence" and "symbol of continuity", recalling his 2010 visit, while prime minister Robert Fico offered condolences. Serbia's president Aleksandar Vučić recalled Harald's "stability, wisdom and dedication". Members of the Presidency of Bosnia and Herzegovina and its foreign minister expressed condolences, and Croatia's prime minister Andrej Plenković described Harald as "a strong advocate of friendship and cooperation" in Europe. Kosovo's acting president Albulena Haxhiu said Harald served with "dignity, devotion and humanity", and foreign minister Glauk Konjufca similarly paid tribute.

Estonia's prime minister Kristen Michal expressed condolences, and foreign minister Margus Tsahkna said Harald "helped preserve and strengthen" relations between Estonia and Norway. Latvia's president Edgars Rinkēvičs and foreign minister Baiba Braže expressed condolences to the royal family and the people of Norway. Lithuania's president Gitanas Nausėda, prime minister Mindaugas Sinkevičius and foreign minister Kęstutis Budrys expressed condolences. Ukraine's president Volodymyr Zelenskyy said Harald would be remembered for his "steadfast support" during the Russo-Ukrainian war. Former president Petro Poroshenko recalled Harald's "wisdom and commitment", and foreign minister Andrii Sybiha also offered condolences. Belarusian president Alexander Lukashenko recalled Harald's role in bilateral relations, and opposition leader Sviatlana Tsikhanouskaya described his death as "a profound loss".

Japan's emperor Naruhito and empress Masako, prime minister Sanae Takaichi and foreign minister Toshimitsu Motegi sent condolences to their counterparts in Norway. The Chinese foreign ministry expressed condolences and highlighted Harald's contribution to bilateral relations between China and Norway. India's prime minister Narendra Modi recalled Harald's "warmth and profound sense of service". In Bhutan, King Jigme Khesar Namgyel Wangchuck, Queen Jetsun Pema, Prime Minister Tshering Tobgay, and other government officials prayed for Harald at the Grand Kuenrey of Tashichho Dzong.

Malaysia's prime minister Anwar Ibrahim said Harald would be "remembered for his generous understanding of what it meant to be Norwegian." Prime Minister of Thailand Anutin Charnvirakul ordered flags to be flown at half-mast for three days, as king Vajiralongkorn offered condolences to his Norwegian counterpart.

Egypt's president Abdel Fattah el‑Sisi recalled his 2024 visit to Norway, and foreign minister Badr Abdelatty offered condolences to his Norwegian counterpart Espen Barth Eide. Israel's president Isaac Herzog and Palestine's president Mahmoud Abbas expressed condolences. Iraq's president Nizar Amidi said Harald had "dedicated a significant part of his life" to serving his country and promoting peace and solidarity. Prime Minister Ali al-Zaidi reflected on Norway's political and humanitarian support for Iraq. Kurdistan Region prime minister Masrour Barzani expressed condolences. The Jordanian royal court announced three days of national mourning.

Cameroon's president Paul Biya offered condolences to prime minister Støre. Canada's Prime Minister Mark Carney recalled Harald's visit to Canada during his exile in World War II. Canadian governor general Louise Arbour recalled Harald's "humanity and devotion" with which he carried out his position as head of state. Brazil recalled Harald's state visits in 2003 and 2013. U.S. State Department spokesperson Tommy Pigott also conveyed condolences.

U.S. President Donald Trump expressed condolences on Truth Social; the delay in his comments was noted. Eylon Levy, a former spokesman for the thirty-seventh government of Israel, wrote on X: "King Harald wanted to send Israel official condolences after the October 7 Massacre. The Norwegian government blocked him. May he rest in peace." Russia made no official comment on his death.

==== Non-reigning royal families ====
Prince Jean, Count of Paris, expressed his condolences to Queen Sonja and the royal family.

Head of the House of Wittelsbach Franz von Bayern said that Harald "guided Norway through many societal changes, always remaining known for being down-to-earth, approachable, and tolerant". He also recalled his meeting with Harald in Stockholm on the occasion of King Carl XVI Gustaf's 80th birthday in April.

Pavlos, Crown Prince of Greece, expressed his condolences. He also reflected on "the bonds between our families have been preserved and strengthened across generations."

Shahbanu Farah Pahlavi and former crown prince of Iran Reza Pahlavi expressed their condolences, with Reza Pahlavi stating that Harald "served his country with an unwavering sense of duty, dignity, and devotion to the Norwegian people."

Duke Emanuele Filiberto of Savoy expressed his condolences to Queen Sonja, King Haakon VIII and the people of Norway.

Margareta, Custodian of the Crown of Romania, expressed her condolences to Queen Sonja and King Haakon VIII.

Grand Duchess Maria Vladimirovna of Russia and her family expressed their condolences.

Alexander, Crown Prince of Yugoslavia, expressed condolences on behalf of the royal family of Serbia, saying: "The well-being of his people and the progress of his country were the most important to him. The people knew it very well, and respected their King very much. He set an example we should all follow."

=== Other ===
==== Organisations ====
- ASEAN Inter-Parliamentary Assembly: Seceratary General Chem Widhya expressed his condolences to his counterpart.
- Council of Europe: Secretary General Alain Berset said that Harald "was a source of stability in Norway, embodying dignity, humanity and an unwavering commitment to the values that unite our continent."
- European Commission: President Ursula von der Leyen sent her condolences, emphasising that Harald "served his country with warmth, humility and an unwavering sense of duty" and "was a true European and a lifelong servant of his people."
- European Free Trade Association Surveillance Authority: President Arne Røksund said that Harald "served Norway with exceptional dedication and integrity for more than three decades and was a steadfast symbol of continuity, stability and public service."
- European Space Agency: President Josef Aschbacher expressed his condolences to Queen Sonja and the Norwegian royal family and people.
- International Handball Federation: President Hassan Moustafa sent his condolences to the royal family and the Norwegian Handball Federation. The federation reflected on Harald playing handball during his youth.
- NATO: Secretary General Mark Rutte paid tribute to Harald's service and military career, which he said "made him a champion of the Norwegian military and a long-time friend of NATO."
- UNESCO: Director-General Khaled El-Enany offered his condolences.
- United Nations: Secretary-General António Guterres expressed his condolences stating that "[h]e embodied Norway's deep commitment to international solidarity & cooperation that is also reflected in his country's steadfast partnership with the UN." The General Assembly held a session in Harald's memory on 14 September 2026.
- Warsaw Security Forum: The organisation expressed their condolences to the Norwegian people.
- World Sailing: The organisation sent their condolences on behalf of the sailing community. President Li Quanhai said that Harald "had a great presence on the water, where he competed alongside generations of sailors and represented both his nation and his sport with dignity and distinction."

==== Religious groups ====
The First Presidency, the Quorum of the Twelve Apostles, and members of The Church of Jesus Christ of Latter-day Saints expressed their condolences, stating that Harald "provided a steady and unifying presence for his nation."

The Salvation Army expressed their condolences on their website, stating that Harald "had an inspiring ability to lead, touch and see everyone in this country. With his wisdom and warmth, he has been a steady head of state through the many changes and challenges we as a nation have faced over the past 35 years."

==== Schools ====
Balliol College, Oxford reflected on Harald's studying politics and economics and flew their flag at half-mast. The Luther College expressed their condolences.

President of the St. Olaf College Susan Rundell Singer expressed her condolences, recalling that Harald "understood the importance of this connection and heritage while also embracing a shared sense of responsibility for the future." Harald and Queen Sonja visited the campus in 2011.
