= Royal mausoleum =

A royal mausoleum is a burial place, primarily for the royal family of a particular country.

== Mausoleums around the World ==
- Burial sites of European monarchs and consorts
- Royal Mausoleum of Hawaii
- Royal Mausoleum of Mauretania
- Royal Mausoleum in St. Vitus Cathedral at Prague Castle, Czech republic: burial place of emperors Ferdinand I and Maximilian II and empress Anna of Bohemia and Hungary.
- Royal Mausoleum, Frogmore in Windsor, England: burial place of Queen Victoria and Prince Albert
- Royal Mausoleum (Norway), in Oslo
- Shah Alam Royal Mausoleum, Selangor, Malaysia
