= Harald V =

King of Norway from 1991 to 2026

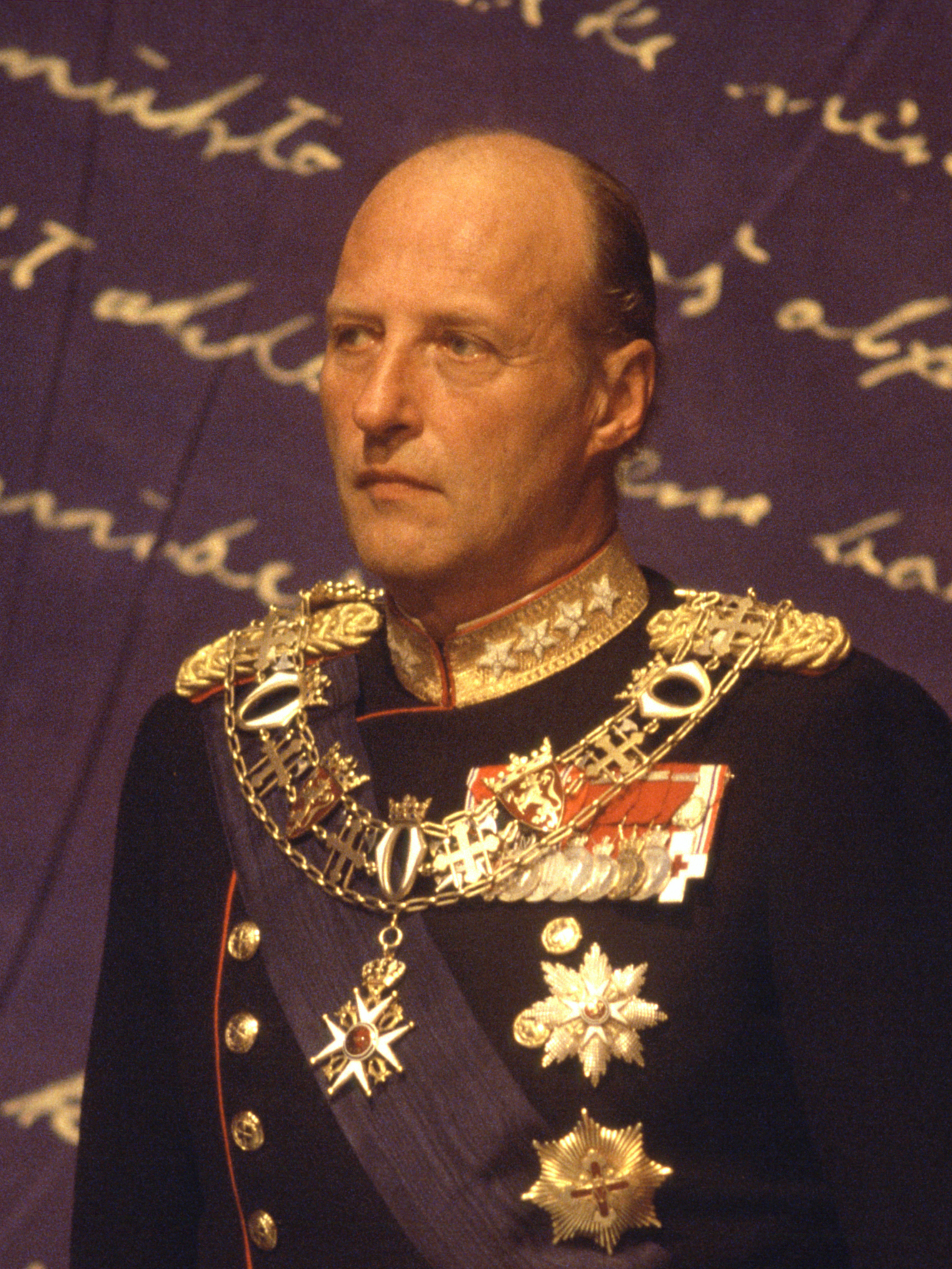
- Harald in 1993

King of Norway
- Reign: 17 January 1991 – 28 August 2026
- Benediction: 23 June 1991; Nidaros Cathedral
- Predecessor: Olav V
- Successor: Haakon VIII
- Regent: Haakon (2003–2004, 2005, 2020, 2024, 2026)

Regent of Norway
- Regency: 1 June 1990 – 17 January 1991
- Monarch: Olav V
- Born: 21 February 1937; Skaugum, Asker, Norway
- Died: 28 August 2026 (aged 89); Rikshospitalet, Oslo, Norway
- Burial: 9 September 2026; Royal Mausoleum, Akershus Fortress, Oslo
- Spouse: Sonja Haraldsen (m. 1968)
- Issue Detail: Princess Märtha Louise; Haakon VIII
- House: Glücksburg
- Father: Olav V
- Mother: Märtha of Sweden
- Religion: Church of Norway
- Sports career
Medal record
Sailing
Representing Norway
World Championships
| Gold medal – first place | 1987 World Championship | Sailing |
| Silver medal – second place | 1982 World Championship | Sailing |
| Bronze medal – third place | 1988 World Championship | Sailing |
European Championships
| Gold medal – first place | 2005 European Championship | Sailing |

Harald V (21 February 1937 – 28 August 2026) was King of Norway from 1991 until his death in 2026.

Born in Skaugum, Asker, during the reign of his paternal grandfather, King Haakon VII, Harald was the third child and only son of Crown Prince Olav (later King Olav V) and Crown Princess Märtha of Norway. Harald was second in the line of succession at the time of his birth, behind his father. In 1940, as a result of the German occupation during World War II, the royal family went into exile where Harald spent parts of his childhood in Sweden and subsequently the United States.

After World War II ended in 1945, Harald returned to Norway, and later studied for periods at the University of Oslo, the Norwegian Military Academy, and Balliol College, Oxford. An active sportsman, Harald represented Norway in sailing at the 1964, 1968, and 1972 Olympic Games. In 1970, Harald was named the founding president of the Norwegian Sailing Federation. He went on to serve as President of Honour for World Sailing starting in 1994, a position he held until his death, while remaining an active competitor in World Championships until 2022.

Following King Haakon's death in 1957, Harald became crown prince as his father became King Olav V. He married Sonja Haraldsen in 1968; their relationship was initially controversial due to her status as a commoner. They had two children, Märtha Louise and Haakon. In 1990, when his father's health declined, Harald became regent and took most of the powers of the monarchy while Olav remained the de jure monarch.

Following his father's death in 1991, Harald acceded to the throne. He was the first Norwegian-born monarch to inherit the throne since Olav IV in 1380. Harald's leadership during major Norwegian national crises earned him widespread acclaim both domestically and internationally. His presence during events such as the 1992 New Year's Day Storm, the 2011 Norway attacks, the 2020 Gjerdrum landslide, and the COVID-19 pandemic in Norway earned him the popular nickname "grandfather of the nation" (nasjonens bestefar).

During his reign, Harald suffered from several health issues, with his son acting as regent several times between 2003 and 2026. He became Norway's oldest reigning monarch in 2024, surpassing his father. Following the death of Elizabeth II, his paternal second cousin, in 2022, he became Europe's oldest reigning monarch. Harald died in 2026 in Oslo, aged 89, and was succeeded by his son Haakon VIII.

== Early life and education ==
=== Birth ===
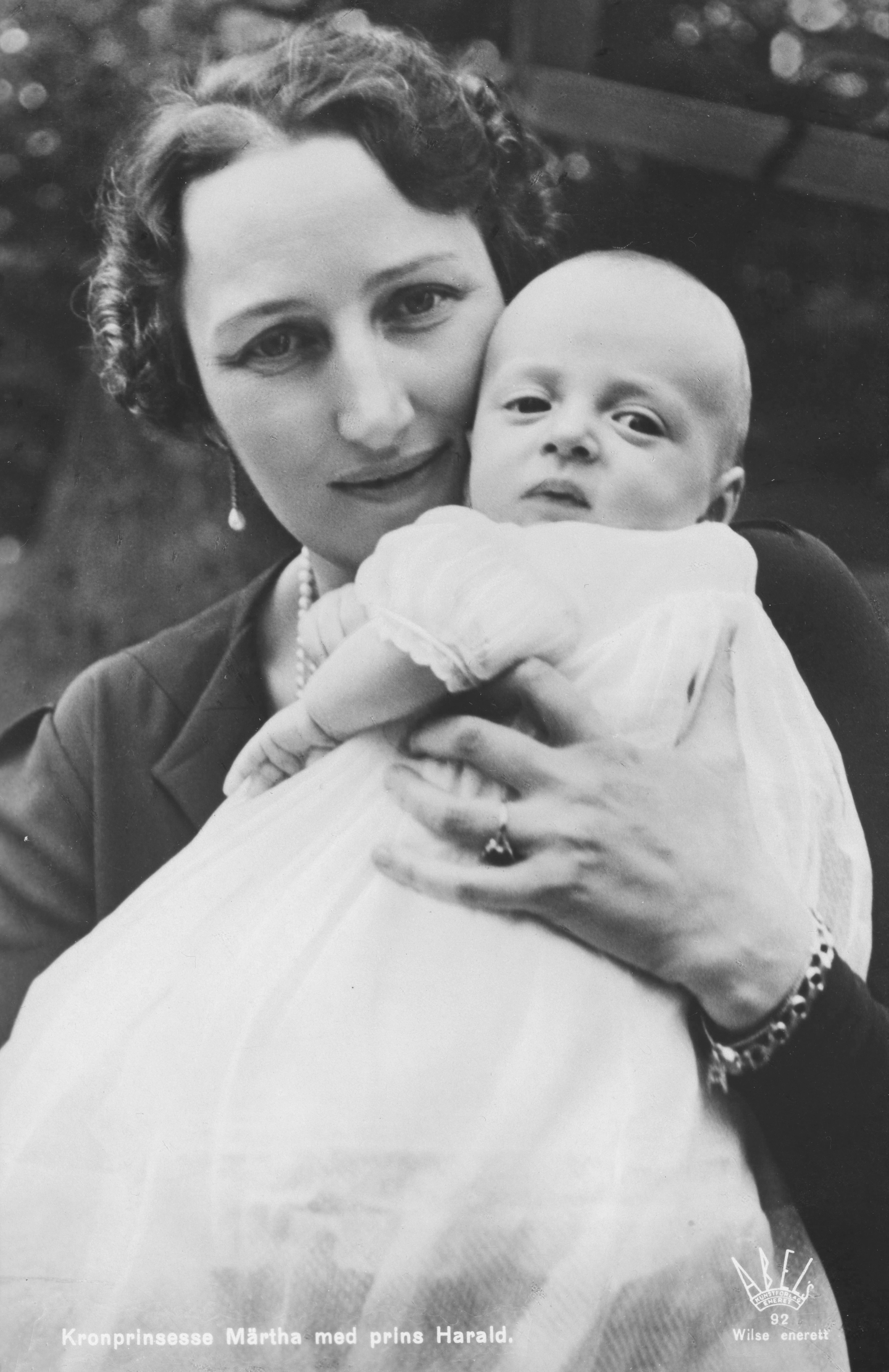
Harald with his mother Crown Princess Märtha in 1937

Harald was born on 21 February 1937 at the Skaugum estate during the reign of his grandfather, King Haakon VII. His parents were Crown Prince Olav (later Olav V) and Princess Märtha of Sweden. He had two older sisters, Princess Ragnhild and Princess Astrid. Harald was baptised in the Royal Chapel of the Royal Palace in Oslo on 31 March by bishop Johan Lunde.

His godparents were his paternal grandparents, King Haakon VII and Queen Maud of Norway; his maternal grandparents Prince Carl and Princess Ingeborg of Sweden; his maternal uncle, King Leopold III of Belgium; his paternal grandaunt Queen Mary and King George VI of the United Kingdom; and Crown Princess Ingrid of Denmark.

At the time of Harald's birth, he was second in the line of succession to the Norwegian throne, after his father.

=== Second World War ===
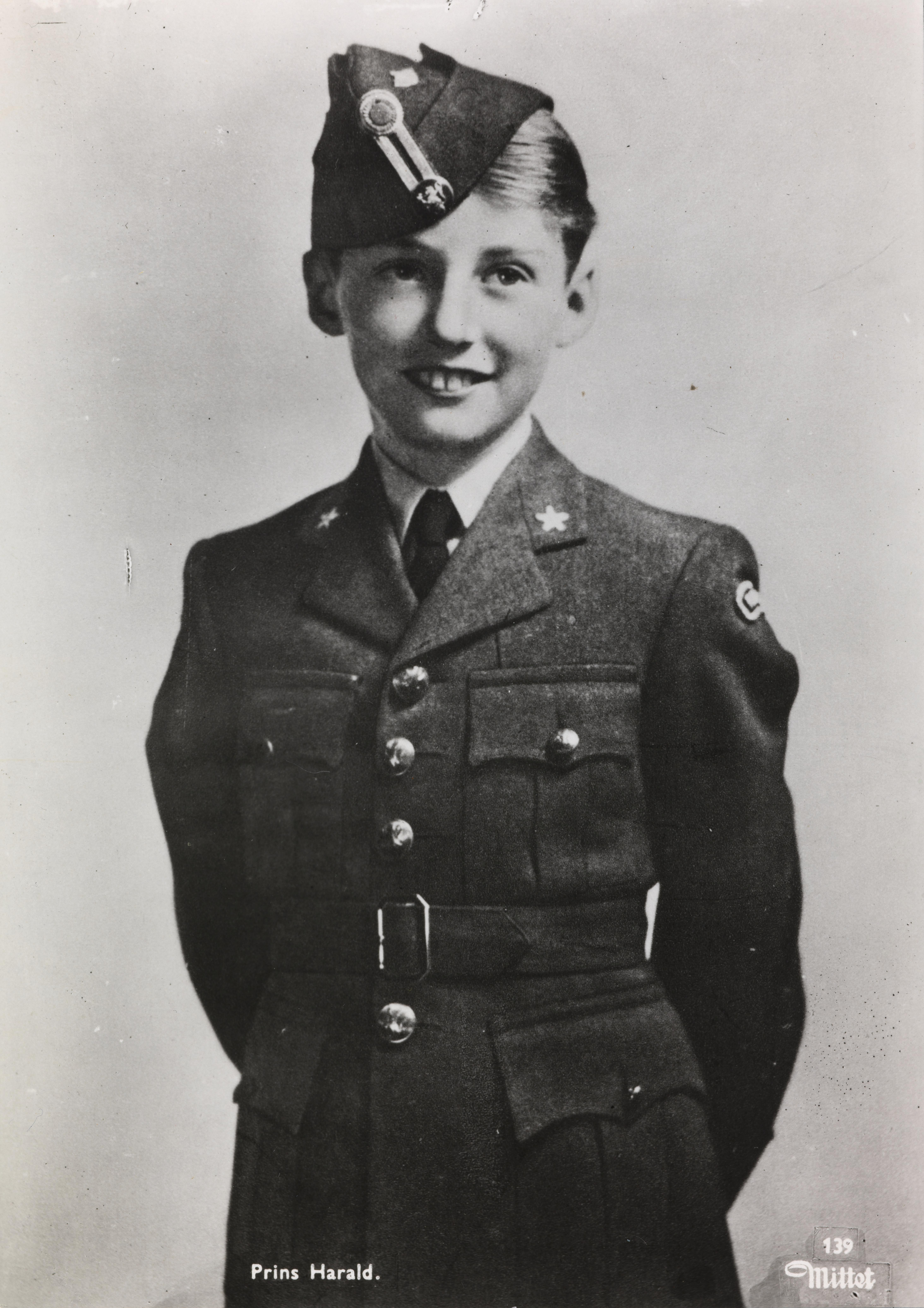
Harald as mascot for the Royal Norwegian Air Force at its Little Norway airfield in Canada, 1943

In 1940, the entire royal family fled Oslo because of the German invasion. It was deemed safer for the family to split up. The King and Olav remained in Norway, and Märtha made her way to Sweden with Ragnhild, Astrid, and Harald. They reached Sweden on the night of 10 April, but although Märtha was Swedish-born, they encountered problems at the border station. According to Astrid and others who were present, they were admitted only after the driver threatened to ram the border gate. Another account does not describe the escape so dramatically. When the King and Olav asked Swedish foreign minister Christian Günther whether they could sleep one night in Sweden without being interned, their request was refused.

Harald spent the following days in Sälen before moving to his maternal uncle Prince Carl Bernadotte's home in Frötuna on 16 April. On 26 April, the group moved to Drottningholm in Stockholm. King Gustaf V, Märtha's paternal uncle, is accounted to have had an amicable relationship with his Norwegian guests, but the topic of the war in Norway was not to be raised. Influential Swedish politicians, including Minister of Justice Karl Gustaf Westman, wanted Märtha and Harald to be sent back to Norway so he could be proclaimed King by the Germans.

After the King and Olav had to leave Norway on 7 June, they felt Sweden might not be the best place for the rest of the family, and began planning for them to go to the United States. On 17 August, Märtha and her children left for the United States from Petsamo, Finland, aboard the United States Army transport ship American Legion.

Harald, his mother, and his sisters lived in Washington, D.C., during the war, while his father, Olav, and his grandfather, King Haakon, stayed in London with the Norwegian government-in-exile. In 1945, he was present at the fourth inauguration of Franklin D. Roosevelt on the South Portico of the White House. Such childhood experiences were reflected in a trace of an American accent when he spoke English.

Harald visited Norwegian servicemen training in the United States. He also made visits outside the United States, travelling north to visit Norwegian personnel at the training base Little Norway in Ontario, Canada. He attended The White Hall Country School from 1943 with his sisters. Harald returned to Norway with his family after the war's end in 1945.

=== Return ===
In the autumn of 1945, Harald was enrolled at Smestad School. He was confirmed in May 1953 by bishop Eivind Berggrav at Slottskapellet, the royal chapel.

Harald's mother died in 1954, and his maternal grandmother in 1958.

== Crown Prince ==
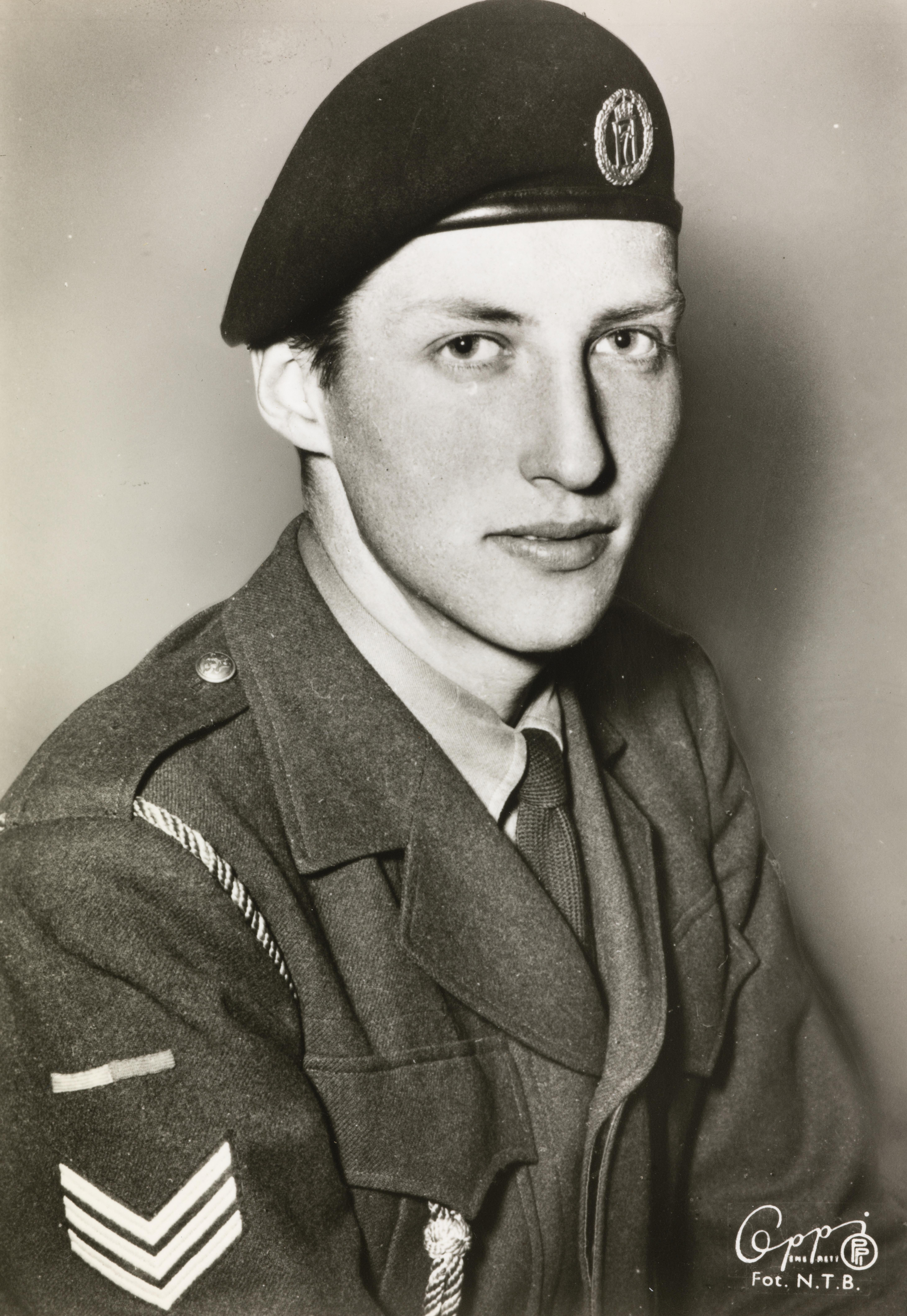
Harald as a student in the Cavalry Officers' Candidate School, Trandum, 1956/1957

Harald studied at Oslo katedralskole from 1950 to 1955. He attended Befalsskolen for kavaleriet at Trandum from January 1956 to May 1957. He studied at the Norwegian Military Academy from 1957 to 1959. On the death of his grandfather on 21 September 1957, Harald became crown prince at the age of 20. He attended the Council of State for the first time on 27 September. Harald reached the age of majority on 21 February 1958 when he became 21, and took the oath to the Constitution of Norway on the same day. In March, he served as regent in the King's absence for the first time.

In 1960, Harald entered Balliol College, Oxford, where he studied history, economics, and politics. He was a keen rower during his student days and was taught by fellow student and friend Nick Bevan, later a leading British school rowing coach. In 1960, he also made his first official journey abroad, visiting the United States for the 50th anniversary of the American Scandinavian Foundation. An avid sailor, Harald represented Norway in the yachting events of the Summer Olympics in Tokyo in 1964, Mexico City in 1968, and Munich in 1972. He carried the Norwegian flag at the 1964 Games.

=== Marriage ===
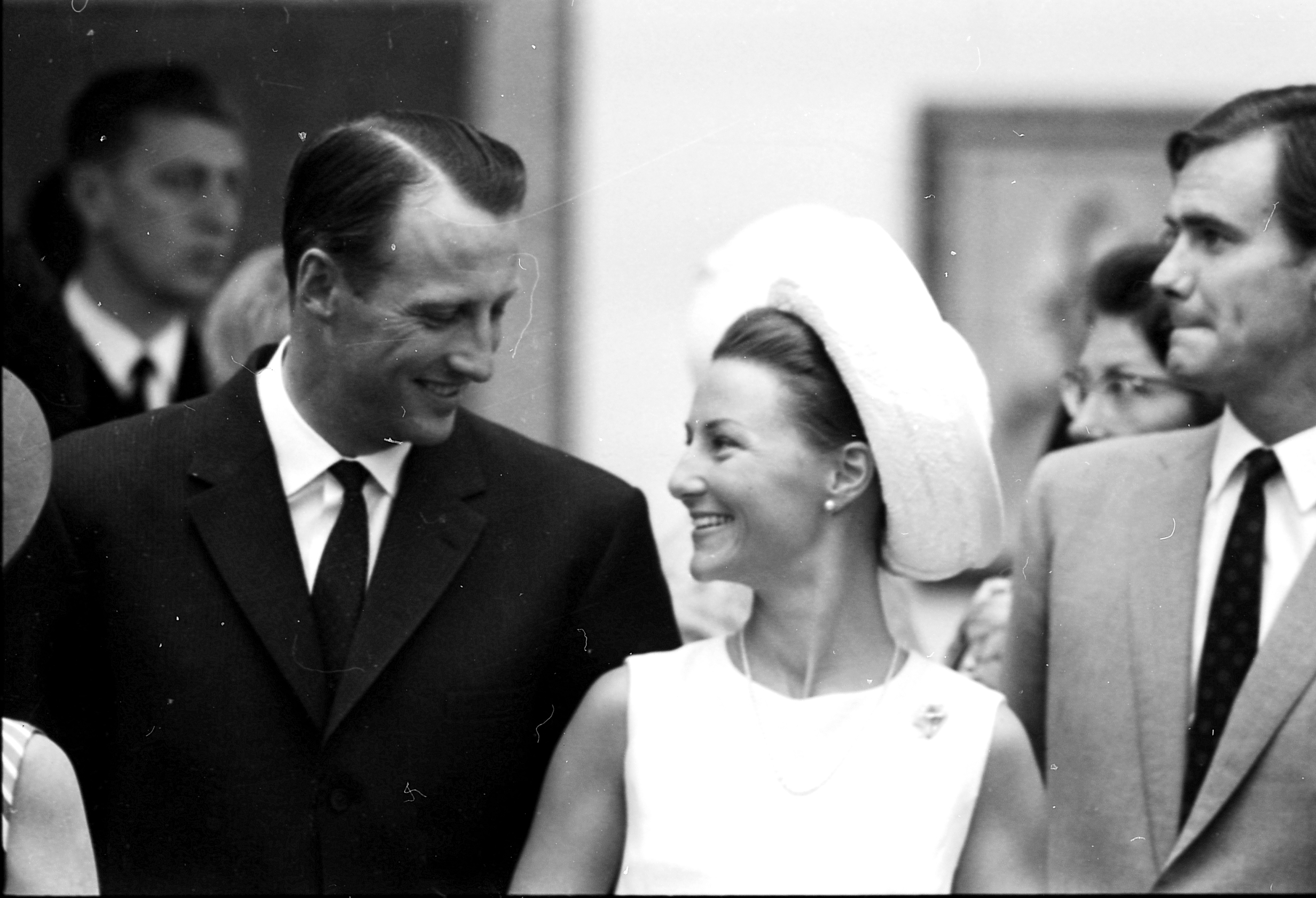
Harald with Sonja Haraldsen, 1968

Harald married Sonja Haraldsen at Oslo Domkirke in Oslo on 29 August 1968. The pair had dated for nine years, but Olav was reluctant to allow his son to marry a commoner. He relented only when Harald told his father that if he was not allowed to marry Sonja he would not marry at all. The couple had two children, Princess Märtha Louise (born 1971) and Haakon (born 1973).

== Reign ==
On the death of his father on 17 January 1991, Harald succeeded to the Norwegian throne. He became the first Norwegian-born monarch since Olav IV died in 1387, a gap of 604 years. Harald was the sixth King of Norway to bear that name, and the first in 855 years. The five earlier kings were Harald Fairhair, Harald Greycloak, Harald Bluetooth, Harald Hardrada, and Harald Gille. Harald Bluetooth is usually not given a number in the list of Norwegian monarchs, so Harald was numbered as Harald V. He chose to use his grandfather and father's royal motto, "Alt for Norge". He also chose to continue the tradition of royal benediction, introduced with his father, and was consecrated with Queen Sonja in the Nidaros Cathedral on 23 June 1991.

Harald's reign was marked by modernisation and reform for the Norwegian Royal family. The King cooperated closely with Queen Sonja and Haakon in making the royal household more open to the Norwegian public and the Norwegian media. Harald's decision to accept two more commoners into the royal family, Mette-Marit Tjessem Høiby and Ari Behn, was interpreted as a sign of modernisation and adjustment. Under Harald and Sonja's leadership, comprehensive renovation projects took place at the Bygdøy Royal Estate, the Royal Palace, the royal stables, and Oscarshall. The latter three were also opened to the public. Together with Queen Sonja, the king for decades attempted to establish a palace museum in Oslo.

=== Constitutional role ===
Although the Constitution of Norway vested the King with executive authority, Harald exercised it only in accordance with parliamentary conventions established since 1884. His acts required the countersignature of a member of the Council of State, usually the prime minister, and the Council's proceedings were signed by all ministers. Since 1905, no Norwegian monarch has refused assent to an act of the Storting.

By convention, Harald appointed as prime minister the leader of the parliamentary bloc able to command a majority in the Storting. When the parliamentary situation was unclear, he relied on the advice of the President of the Storting and the sitting prime minister. Unlike many constitutional monarchs, he did not have the power to dissolve Parliament, as the Constitution does not allow for snap elections.

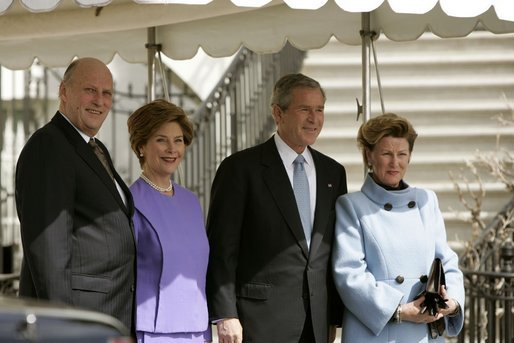
Harald, Laura Bush, George W. Bush, and Queen Sonja, 2005

The King met the Council of State at the Royal Palace every Friday. He also had weekly meetings with the Prime Minister and the Minister of Foreign Affairs. He received foreign envoys and formally opened parliament every October, delivering a speech from the throne during each opening. Harald travelled extensively throughout Norway and made official state visits to other countries, as well as receiving and hosting guests.

Until a constitutional amendment in 2012, the King of Norway was the formal head of the Church of Norway. Harald wished that the monarch still be required by the constitution to be of Evangelical-Lutheran faith, which the parliament accepted.

On 8 May 2018, the King's constitutional status as holy was removed, while leaving his sovereign immunity intact.

=== 1990s and 2000s ===
In 1994, both the King and Haakon played roles during the opening ceremony of the 1994 Winter Olympics in Lillehammer. Harald opened the games, while Haakon lit the cauldron.

In 1997, Harald apologized to the Sámi people for the government trying to erase their culture for over two centuries.

=== 2010s ===
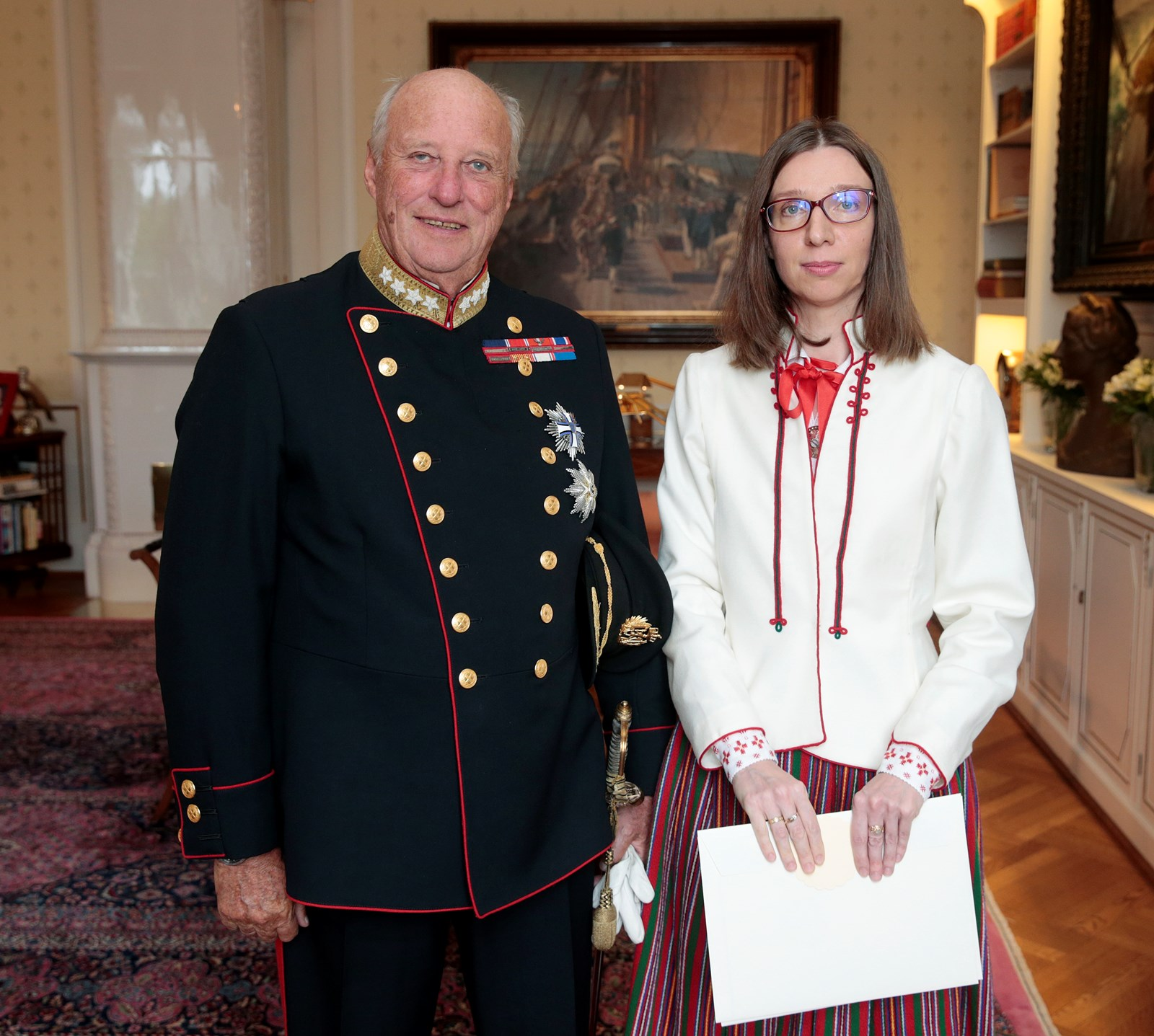
Estonian ambassador Janne Jõesaar-Ruusalu presents her credentials to the King in 2016

In 2015, Harald became the world's first reigning monarch to visit Antarctica, specifically the Norwegian dependency Queen Maud Land.

In 2016, in a speech marking 25 years on the throne, Harald sought to unify Norwegians on religious tolerance, diversity, and LGBTQ rights:

Norwegians are enthusiastic young people — and wise old people. Norwegians are single, divorced, families with children and old married couples. Norwegians are girls who love girls, boys who love boys, and girls and boys who love each other. Norwegians believe in God, Allah, the Universe and nothing... In other words... Norway is you.

— Harald V

When the King and Queen turned 80 years old in 2017, Harald decided to open the former royal stables to the public as a gift to his wife. The new venue was named The Queen Sonja Art Stable and is the first institution owned by the royal family which is permanently open to the public. Harald was named Name of the Year by the newspaper VG in 2017.

=== 2020s ===
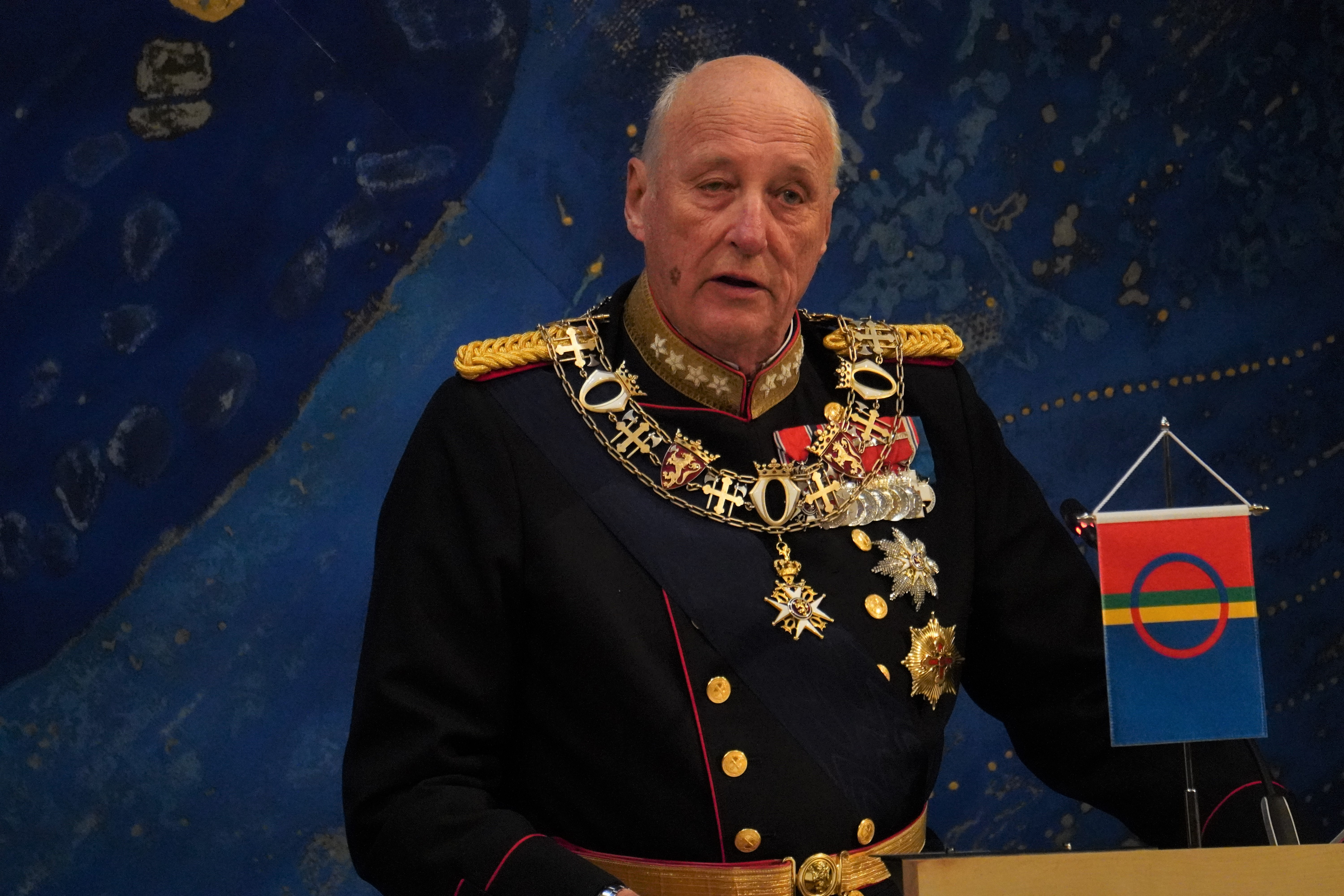
Harald in October 2021 at the opening of Sámi Parliament session of 2021–22

On 17 January 2021, Harald celebrated 30 years on the Norwegian throne. Following the death of Elizabeth II on 8 September 2022, Harald became Europe's oldest hereditary reigning monarch. Later in September 2022, he visited Denmark to celebrate the Golden Jubilee of Margrethe II and attended the state funeral of Elizabeth II in London. On 15 September 2023, he attended the celebrations of the Golden Jubilee of Carl XVI Gustaf in Stockholm, Sweden.

During periods when Harald was unable to perform his duties as sovereign, Haakon served as regent. Despite his health issues, Harald never considered abdicating. Following the announcement of the impending abdication of his Danish counterpart Margrethe II, he told the press, "No, I don't really have [a plan to abdicate]. I stand by what I have said all along. I have taken an oath to the Storting, and it lasts for life."

==== Rebel Royals ====
In the 2025 Netflix documentary Rebel Royals featuring his daughter Märtha Louise and son-in-law Durek Verrett, Verrett accused Harald, Sonja, and Haakon of not "knowing what racism was" and said the King and Queen hated everything he did and "would always let Märtha know" he was the wrong boyfriend for her. Verrett said the first time Harald asked about his experiences of racism was when Oprah with Meghan and Harry aired, and that "they didn't want a family discussion because they didn't want to treat me that way. They wanted to have a family discussion because they were afraid I might be the next one on Oprah." Norwegian media called the documentary and Verrett's statements a "character assassination of the king and queen". Norwegian commentators said Verrett and Märtha Louise "are making fools of themselves".

In a speech during the 2025 Stortingsmiddag (dinner with members of the Storting) at the Royal Palace, Harald responded to the documentary by jokingly proposing a sequel titled "Kongen minutt for minutt" (The King minute by minute).

==== Høiby and Epstein affairs ====
Harald refused to answer questions about the relationship of Mette-Marit and Jeffrey Epstein and the criminal trial of Marius Borg Høiby, Mette-Marit's son by an earlier relationship, for rape.

== Health and death ==
Harald experienced several periods of ill health following the start of the twenty‑first century. He was diagnosed with bladder cancer in 2003, and in 2005, he underwent heart surgery. In 2020, he underwent another heart surgery to replace a heart valve.

He had a leg operation in January 2022. Harald was hospitalised in August with a fever and again in December for an infection, and was admitted once more in May 2023, shortly before Constitution Day. Harald contracted COVID-19 in March 2022 and again in October 2023. In January 2024, the royal palace announced that he was on sick leave due to a respiratory infection.

While on holiday in Malaysia in February 2024, Harald was hospitalised on Langkawi with a low heart rate and had a temporary pacemaker implanted. He was discharged on 3 March and returned to Norway on a medical evacuation flight, after which he was placed on two weeks' sick leave. He received a permanent pacemaker on 12 March and was discharged two days later.

In February 2026, he was hospitalised during a vacation in Tenerife and treated for a skin infection on his leg.

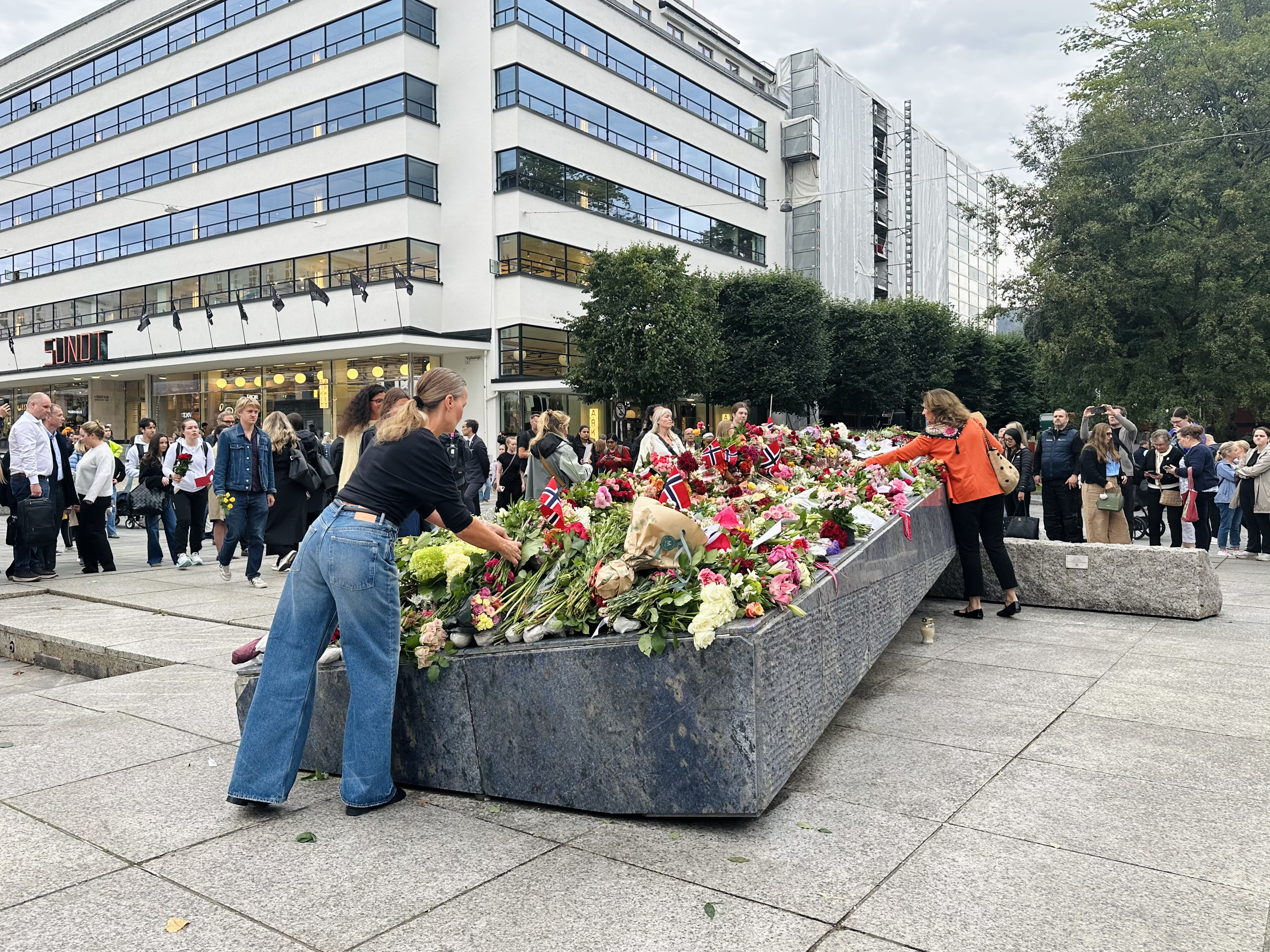
Commemoration of Harald at The Blue Stone monument in Bergen on the day of his death

On 17 August 2026, Harald was admitted to Oslo University Hospital, Rikshospitalet with fluid retention caused by cortisone treatment for hemolytic anemia and was placed on two weeks' sick leave. On 24 August, the palace announced that his condition had worsened and that he was receiving antibiotics for a bloodstream infection. On 27 August, the palace announced that his condition had become "extremely serious", with family members visiting the hospital to be by his bedside. Harald died at 06:35 (UTC+2) on 28 August, aged 89.

On the evening of 28 August, when Harald's coffin was taken from the National Hospital to the Royal Palace, more than an estimated 10,000 people lined the streets of Oslo with flowers, Norwegian flags, and cards. His state funeral was held in Oslo on 9 September.

== Public image ==
Harald's leadership during Norwegian national crises, such as the New Year's Day Storm (1992), the July 2011 massacre, the 2020 Gjerdrum landslide, and particularly the COVID-19 pandemic (January 2020 to March 2022), was met with both national and international acclaim. He was popularly known among the Norwegian public as a "grandfather of the nation".

He was also known for being humble, down-to-earth and for his sense of humour, as well as his use of informal language with somewhat archaic pronunciations. He was an outdoorsman who participated in skiing, hunting, and fishing. Harald described his life in Norway as "normal", attending movies, travelling without paparazzi surrounding him, and wearing casual attire while sailing, with citizens who were equally laid back about having a monarchy.

Harald was an environmentalist, acting as an initiator of the Norwegian branch of the World Wide Fund for Nature and held the title of president of the Norwegian chapter for 20 years. He went to visit the Amazon region in 2013.

External videos
- "Da kongen 'trollet' dronningen" [When the king "trolled" the queen], NRK, 22 January 2024

In 2014, he sparked media interest when in a TV interview, as he was talking about his planned visit to the Antarctic research station Troll, Harald joked that it was named after his wife Sonja.

In 2020, Harald invited and received hurdler and sprinter Karsten Warholm along with his coach Leif Olav Alnes for an informal conversation at Bygdøy Royal Estate, which was documented by NRK. Warholm was widely criticized by the public and the media for wearing shorts, considered to be "disrespectful" when meeting a reigning monarch. In contrast to public opinion, Harald laughed it off the moment he noticed it and commented "You are lucky, short trousers!" as the weather was exceptionally hot.

In 2025, Amazon Prime Video released the period drama The Commoner, which tells the story of the fight of then Crown Prince Harald and Sonja Haraldsen for their right to marry. Harald is portrayed by Sindre Strand Offerdal.

== Sports career ==
Harald was engaged in sailing, and participated in the Olympics: in 1964 and 1968 in the 5.5 Metre class, and in 1972 in the Soling class. With his sailing crew he won World Championship medals: gold in 1987 and bronze in 1988, both in the One Ton class, and silver in 1982.

In July 2005, Harald and his crew aboard the royal sailboat Fram XV won the gold medal at the European Championships in Sweden. In the 2007 World Championship, the King came in sixth place. In 2016, Harald competed with a team at the sailing World Championships on Lake Ontario, in Toronto, finishing second in the classic fleet category. He was dubbed a "sailor king" by Canada's National Post as he slept on board his yacht Sira. In 2018 he placed third at the World Championships and in 2022 finished 10th in the 8 Metre World Championship.

Harald was the first president of the Norwegian Sailing Federation when it was founded in 1970 and became the President of Honour for World Sailing in 1994 succeeding his father; both maintained the role until their deaths. He also organized the inclusion of sailing under the purview of the Norwegian Olympic and Paralympic Committee and Confederation of Sports, and participated in the organization of the 1994 Winter Olympics in Lillehammer.

== Arms ==
Royal coat of arms

Royal standard

Royal monogram

== Honours and medals ==
The King was a four-star general, an admiral, and formally the Supreme Commander of the Norwegian Armed Forces. The infantry battalion His Majesty the King's Guard are considered the monarch and the Royal Family's bodyguards.

=== National honours and medals ===
- Grand Master of the Royal Norwegian Order of Saint Olav – Grand Cross with Collar °
- Grand Master of the Royal Norwegian Order of Merit – Grand Cross °
- St Olav's medal °
- Defence Service Medal with Laurel Branch °
- Royal House Centennial Medal °
- King Haakon VII Commemorative Medal 1. October 1957 °
- King Haakon VII 1905–1955 Jubilee Medal °
- King Haakon VII Centenary Medal °
- King Olav V Commemorative Medal of 30. January 1991 °
- King Olav V Jubilee Medal °
- King Olav V Centenary Medal °
- Defence Service Medal with three stars °
- Army National Service Medal with three stars °
- Krigsdeltakerforbundet Badge of Honour °
- Norwegian Red Cross Badge of Honour °
- Norwegian Reserve Officers Federal Badge of Honour °
- Naval Society Medal of Merit in gold °
- Norwegian Shooting Society Badge of Honour °
- The Norwegian Confederation of Sports Centenary Medal °
- Norwegian Shooting Society Commemorative Medal in gold °
- Oslo Military Society Badge of Honour in Gold °

The mark ° indicates honours mentioned on the royal family website's page on Harald's decorations.

=== Foreign honours ===
In the British Army, Harald V was appointed an honorary general in 1994, and he was the final Colonel-in-Chief of the Green Howards. He was also an honorary Colonel in the British Royal Marines. He was patron of the Anglo-Norse Society in London, formerly together with Queen Elizabeth II, his second cousin. Harald was in the line of succession to the British throne, because of his descent from King Edward VII. He was a Stranger Knight Companion of the Order of the Garter, an Honorary Knight Grand Cross of the Royal Victorian Order, and a Recipient of the Royal Victorian Chain, as well as numerous other orders of chivalry.

King Harald's crest of the Royal Order of the Seraphim during the traditional Seraphim Toll for deceased knights of the order on the day of their burial, in Riddarholmen Church, Stockholm, Sweden.

==== Northern European countries ====
- Denmark – Knight with Collar of the Order of the Elephant (21 February 1958) °
- Denmark – Grand Commander of the Order of the Dannebrog (28 October 1991) °
- Estonia – Collar of the Order of the Cross of Terra Mariana °
- Finland – Commander Grand Cross with Collar of the Order of the White Rose of Finland °
- Iceland – Grand Cross with Collar of the Order of the Falcon °
- Latvia – Commander Grand Cross with Chain of the Order of the Three Stars °
- Latvia – Grand Cross of the Order of Viesturs °
- Lithuania – Grand Cross (1998) with Golden Chain (2011) of the Order of Vytautas the Great °
- Sweden – Knight with Collar of the Royal Order of the Seraphim (10 April 1958) °
- Sweden – Gustaf V's 90th Anniversary Medal °
- United Kingdom – Recipient of the Royal Victorian Chain (1994) °
- United Kingdom – Honorary Knight Grand Cross of the Royal Victorian Order (1955) °
- United Kingdom – Stranger Knight Companion of the Most Noble Order of the Garter (990th member; 2001) °
- United Kingdom – Honorary Freeman of Newcastle upon Tyne (November 2008)

The mark ° indicates honours mentioned on his official website page about decorations (see also in English).

==== Other countries ====
- Austria – Grand Star of the Decoration of Honour for Services to the Republic of Austria (1964) °
- Belgium – Grand Cordon of the Order of Leopold °
- Brazil – Grand Collar of the Order of the Southern Cross °
- Bulgaria – Grand Cross of the Order of the Balkan Mountains °
- Chile – Collar of the Order of Merit °
- Croatia – Grand Cross of the Grand Order of King Tomislav °
- France – Grand Cross of the Legion of Honour °
- Germany – Grand Cross Special Class of the Order of Merit of the Federal Republic of Germany °
- Greece – Grand Cross of the Order of the Redeemer °
- Greece – The Royal House of Greece Centenary Medal °
- Hungary – Grand Cross with Collar of the Order of Merit of the Republic of Hungary °
- IOC – The Golden Olympic order °
- Italy – Knight Grand Cross (06/1965) with Collar (10/2001) of the Order of Merit of the Italian Republic °
- Japan – Grand Cordon with Collar of the Order of the Chrysanthemum °
- Jordan – Grand Cordon with Collar of the Order of al-Hussein bin Ali °
- Luxembourg – Grand Cross of the Order of Adolph of Nassau °
- Luxembourg – Knight of the Order of the Gold Lion of the House of Nassau °
- Luxembourg – Medal to commemorate the wedding of Grand Duke Jean and Grand Duchess Joséphine-Charlotte °
- Netherlands – Knight Grand Cross of the Order of the Netherlands Lion °
- Netherlands – Grand Cross of the Order of the Crown °
- Netherlands – Commander of the Order of the Golden Ark °
- Netherlands – Medal to commemorate the enthronement of Queen Beatrix °
- Poland – Knight Grand Cross of the Order of the White Eagle °
- Portugal – Grand Cross of the Military Order of Aviz (5 November 1980) °
- Portugal – Grand Collar of the Order of Infante Dom Henrique (13 February 2004) °
- Portugal – Grand Collar of the Order of St. James of the Sword (26 May 2008) °
- Romania – Sash Rank of the Order of the Star of Romania °
- Slovakia – Grand Cross (or 1st Class) of the Order of the White Double Cross (2010) °
- Slovenia – Recipient of the Decoration for Exceptional Merits (2011) °
- Spain – 1,192nd Knight and Collar of the Order of the Golden Fleece (21 April 1995) °
- Spain – Knight Grand Cross of the Order of Charles III (12 April 1982) °
- Spain – Collar of the Order of Charles III (30 June 2006) °
- South Africa – Grand Cross of the Order of Good Hope °
- South Korea – Recipient of the Grand Order of Mugunghwa °
- Thailand – Knight of the Order of the Royal House of Chakri (19 September 1960) °
- Thailand – Knight Grand Cordon (Special Class) of the Order of Chula Chom Klao °
- Turkey – First Class of the Order of the State of Republic of Turkey °
- Yugoslavia – Order of the Yugoslav Great Star °

The mark ° indicates honours mentioned on his official website page about decorations (see also in English).

=== Miscellaneous honours ===
Still a prince at the time, Harald visited Mococa in the 1960s, receiving the title "Cidadão Mocoquense" on 28 February 1964.

Harald V received an honorary degree of Doctor of Civil Law from the University of Oxford in 2006 (as did his father, King Olav, in 1937, and his grandfather, King Haakon, in 1943). The King also received honorary doctorates from Heriot-Watt University in Scotland in 1994, the University of Strathclyde in Scotland in 1985, Waseda University in Japan in 2001, and Pacific Lutheran University in Tacoma, Washington, in 2015. He was also an honorary fellow at Balliol College, Oxford.

- Spirit of Luther Award, awarded by Luther College of Decorah, Iowa
- A 230,000 km^{2} area in Antarctica is named Prince Harald Coast in his honour.
- Portugal – Key of Honor to the City of Lisbon, on 28 May 2008
- In 2013, a 6,500 km^{2} area in Svalbard was named Harald V Land.

== Issue ==
| Name | Birth | Marriage | | Children |
| Name | Birth | Date | Spouse | Children |
|---|---|---|---|---|
| Princess Märtha Louise | 22 September 1971 | 24 May 2002; Divorced 2017 | Ari Behn | Maud Angelica Behn, born 29 April 2003; Leah Isadora Behn, born 8 April 2005; Emma Tallulah Behn, born 29 September 2008 |
| Princess Märtha Louise | 22 September 1971 | 31 August 2024 | Durek Verrett | None |
| Haakon VIII | 20 July 1973 | 25 August 2001 | Mette-Marit Tjessem Høiby | Crown Princess Ingrid Alexandra, born 21 January 2004; Prince Sverre Magnus, born 3 December 2005 |

== See also ==
- Descendants of Christian IX of Denmark – Lists other members of European royalty who share a common ancestor with Harald V

== Notes ==
Harald V House of Schleswig-Holstein-Sonderburg-Glücksburg Cadet branch of the House of Oldenburg Born: 21 February 1937 Died: 28 August 2026
Regnal titles
| Preceded by Olav V | King of Norway; 1991–2026 | Succeeded by Haakon VIII |
Norwegian royalty
| Preceded by Olav | Crown Prince of Norway; 1957–1991 | Succeeded by Haakon |
