= Nils Jernsletten =

Norwegian Sámi professor and editor

Nils Johannes (Juho-Niillas) Jernsletten (14 September 1934; Tana, Norway – 20 May 2012) was a professor of Sámi at the University of Tromsø, and editor of Sámi newspaper Ságat (1964-1966). In 2005, he was made a Commander of the Royal Norwegian Order of St Olav.

His article, Joik and Communication, published in 1977, argues that joiking is a form of communication that is best understood as representing a particular milieu, which cannot be adequately communicated through recording or when performed on stage. This criticism, along with commercial factors, partially led to the end of the joik renaissance of the 1970s in Sami-populated areas in Scandinavia.

== Bibliography ==
- Jernsletten, Nils 1969: Utkast til samisk ordliste for 1.-3. klasse. Oslo : Folkeskolerådet, 1969.
- Jernsletten, Nils 1974: Hállangiella : en undersøkelse av prosodiske faktorer i samisk i Tana. Avhandling (Magistergrad) - Universitetet i Oslo, 1974.
- Jernsletten, Nils 1980: Davvisámi suopmanat : davvisámegiela ja divttasvuonasámegiela suopmanteavsttat ja suopmankárttat / Nils Jernsletten.[Romssa] : Romssa universitehta. Sámegiela ossodat, ISL,
- Jernsletten, Nils 1983: Álgosátnegirji : samisk-norsk ordbok / Nils Jernsletten. Oslo : Universitetsforlaget, c1983.
- Jernsletten, Nils 1984: Intonation as a distinctive factor in Saami. Riepmočála. Oslo: Novus.

== In other works ==
- Gaup Eira, Inger Marie; Johanna Ijäs ja Ole Henrik Magga. 2004: Juho-Niillasa 70-jagi beaivái. Sámi dieđalas áigecála; nr 1/2004

== See also ==
- Sami Church Council (Church of Norway)
