= Tore Johnsen =

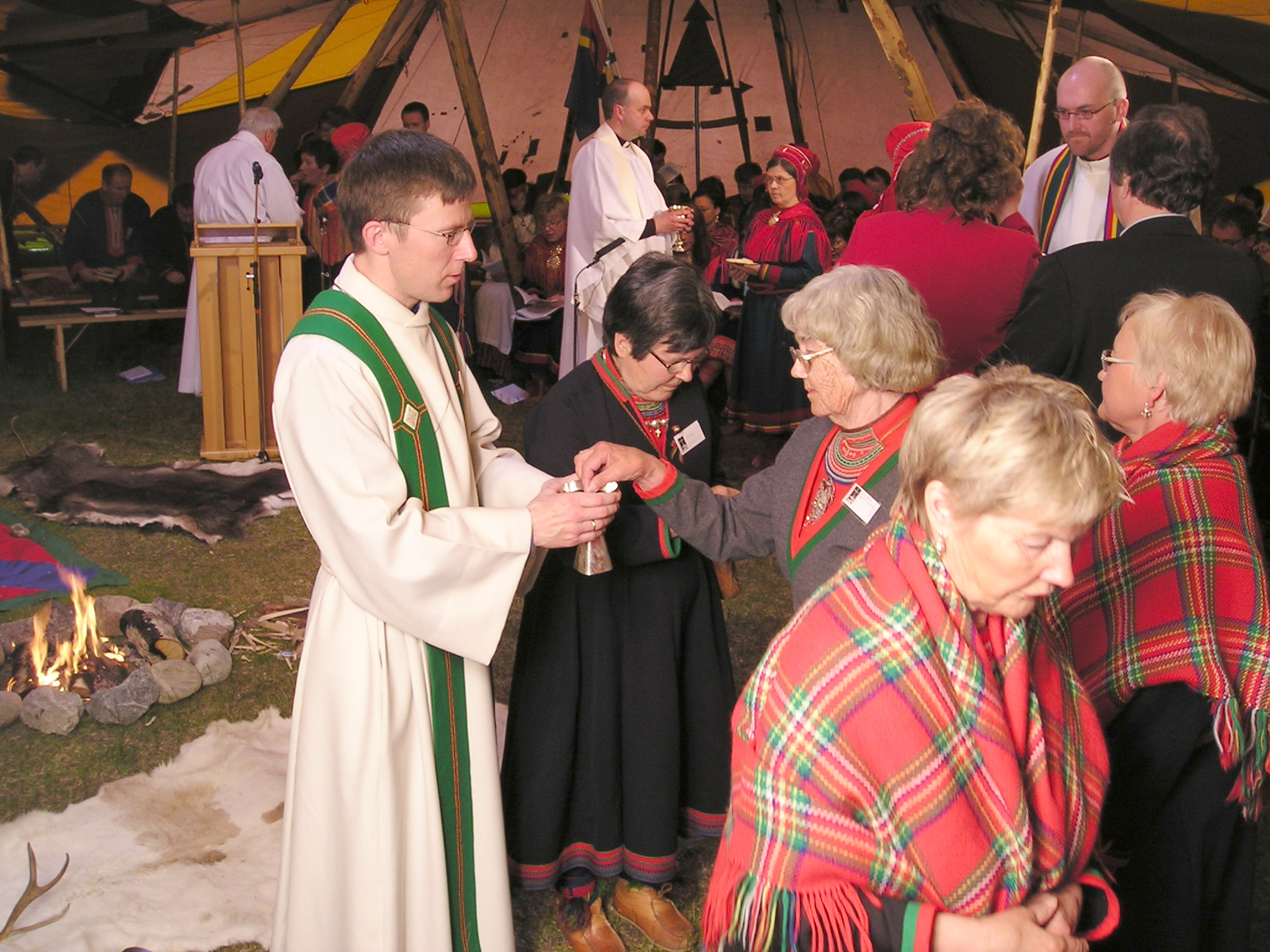
Tore Johnsen is an associate professor at VID Specialized University in Tromsø, Norway. He was the general secretary of the Sami Church Council 2009-2016.

Tore Johnsen (born 28 January 1969 in Østfold) is the general secretary of the Sami Church Council since 2009, former leader of the council (2006–2009), and a central figure within Sami church life. Johnsen is an associate professor at VID Specialized University in Tromsø, Norway.

== Background ==
Johnsen is a graduate from MF Norwegian School of Theology (cand.theol., 1997) and has completed the practical theological training (Practical theological exam, 1998), also from MF. He also graduated from the University of Oslo in Sámi and completed the specialisation programme of the Association of Ministers in the Church of Norway (SPP, comparable to the American D.Min.). Johnsen also had a period of study at the theological study centre for indigenous studies Dr. Jessie Saulteaux Resource Centre, United Church of Canada. Johnsen completed his PhD in World Christianity at the University of Edinburgh in 2020.

Tore Johnsen has previously worked for the Norwegian Mission to the Sami people (1988–1993), Executive Officer for the Sami Church Council (1994–1995), minister in Tana og Nesseby Parish (1998–2005), acting Dean of Sami Ministry in Diocese of Nord-Hålogaland (2003, and 2007–09). He has also been a central person in the completion of a new Sami hymnal book (Sálbmagirjii II)

In 2005 Johnsen received the prestigious St. Olav Scholarship to write a new Sami contextual catechism for youths and young adults.

== Bibliography ==
- “Farsarven” (A Fathers heritage) and “Trofasthet i alle mine relasjoner” (Faithfulness in All my Relationships) in Vi bekjenner at jorden hører Herren til, Sami Church Council, Oslo, 1996
- "Oskkáldasvuohta buot mu relašunnain" in Mii dovddastit eatnama gullat Hearrái : studieprošeakta Sámis 1994-1996', Norgga girku, Sámi girkoráđđi, 1999
- In the circle of life : analyse av nord-amerikansk urfolksteologi og vurdering av dens overføringsverdi til en samisk kirkelig kontekst - basert på et casestudy av Dr. Jessie Saulteaux Resource Centre (In the Circle of Life : an Analysis of North-American Indigenous Theology and an Assessment of its Relevance for a Sami Church Context), Master's Thesis, MF Norwegian School of Theology, Oslo, 1997
- "Samisk kristendomsforståelse og samisk dåpsopplæring" (Sami Christianity and Sami Christian Nurturing) in Prismet : Pedagogisk tidsskrift, IKO, nr. 5/6 (year 54), Oslo, 2003
- Sámi luondduteologiija - Samisk naturteologi på grunnlag av nålevende tradisjonsstoff og nedtegnede myter (Sami Theology of Nature based on Contemporary Traditions and Recorded Myths]. Institutt for religionsvitenskap, Det samfunnsvitenskapelige fakultet, Universitetet i Tromsø, 2005
- Jordens barn, solens barn, vindens barn : kristen tro i et samisk landskap (Children of the Earth, Children of the Sun, Children of the Wind: Christian Faith in a Sami Context, Verbum, Oslo, 2007
- Sami Nature-Centered Christianity in the European Arctic: Indigenous Theology beyond Hierarchical Worldmaking. Lanham, MD: Lexington Books, 2022.
