= Stortingsmiddag =

Annual dinner in Norway

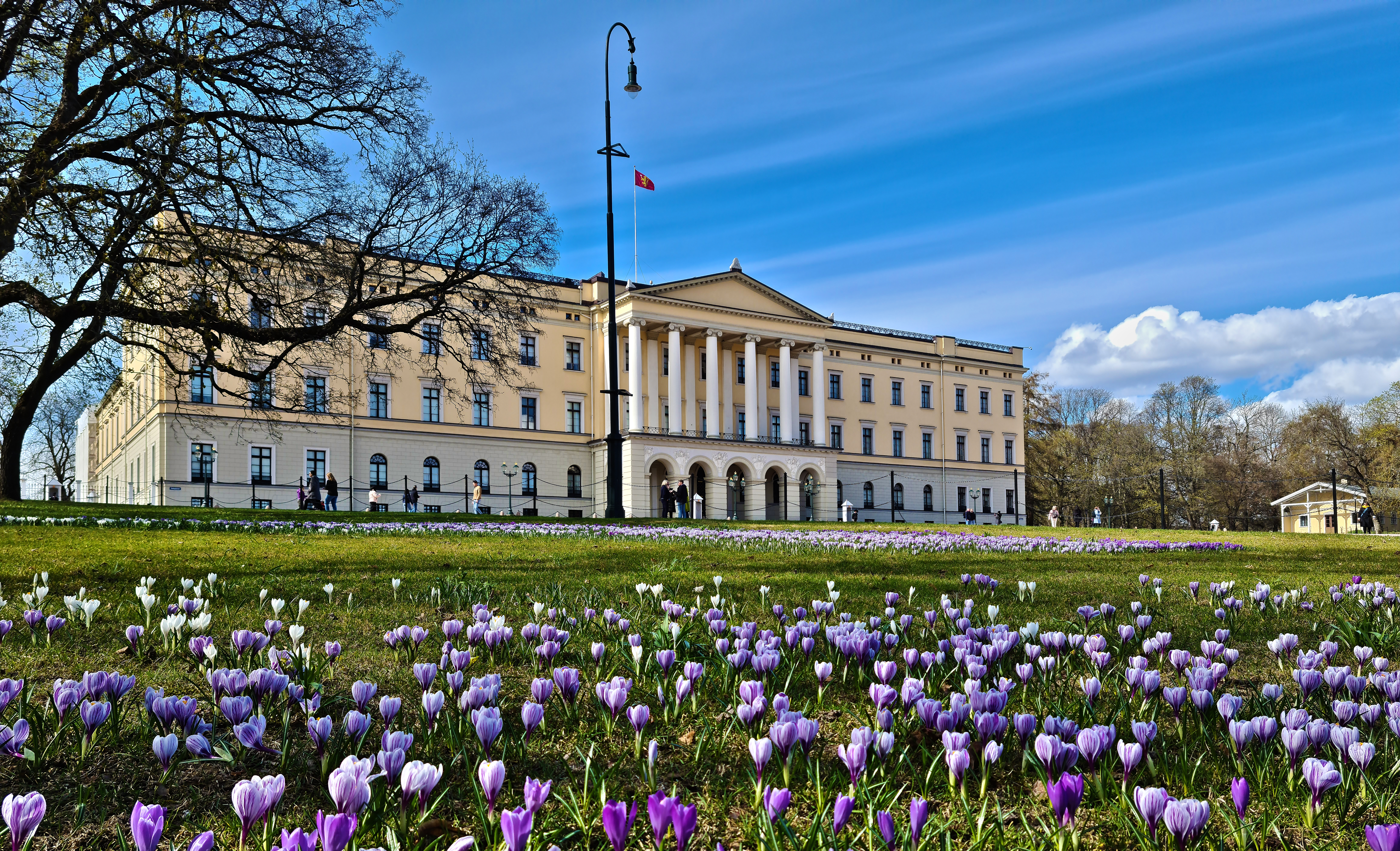
The Royal Palace, Oslo where the annual dinner is held.

The Stortingsmiddag (lit. 'parliamentary dinner') is an annual dinner held in Oslo for the representatives of the Norwegian Parliament, known as the Storting. The King and Queen of Norway host the event at the Royal Palace for members of parliament. The Royal House describes the dinner as the "physical meeting between the King and the people's elected representatives on royal grounds".

== History ==
King Haakon VII was the first Norwegian monarch to invite members of parliament to dinner at the Palace. The inaugural dinner was held in 1906. The dinner has been held annually since 1906, except in 2020 when the country was under lockdown and restrictions during the COVID-19 pandemic, the war years during World War II, and during maintenance work at the palace. In 1906, three women were present, including Queen Maud. 2023 was the last dinner hosted by King Harald V.

== Format ==
The Storting dinner has changed in form in various ways. One of the changes concerns the menu; while previously food from French cuisine was mostly served, it has become customary to serve food based on Norwegian ingredients. There are around 200 guests. Politicians are in attendance alongside members of the Norwegian royal family. The highlights of the dinner are the King's speech and the reply speech from the Storting president.
