= Sami Church Council (Church of Norway) =

Crest of the Church of Norway

The Sami Church Council (n.sa. Sámi girkoráđđi, l.sa. Sáme girkoráde, s.sa. Saemien gærhkoeraerie) is the organ of the Church of Norway responsible for Sámi church life. It answers to the General Synod of the Church of Norway.

== Background ==
The history of the Sámi people is one of marginalisation and Norwegianization – the government policy of forced assimilation of the Sámi into Norwegian society. Christian missions among the Sámi people go back to the Middle Ages, but from 1700 the Protestant and pietistic mission among the Sámi, together with state colonialism, brought lasting changes to the Sámi society (as well as religion). From around 1850 a very rough assimilation policy held the Sámi people in a firm grip until 1980. This period may be referred to as the Dark Ages of the Sami people. This assimilation policy permeated the public officials, schools and the Church of Norway. In parts of Sápmi the Sámi culture and language was eradicated during this period.

Throughout the nineteen-eighties, an increasing awareness of the rights of the indigenous peoples became visible both in the Norwegian and the Sámi society. The awakening had begun for the Sámi people in the beginning of the 20th century and during the so-called Alta controversy it became a hot topic among the Norwegian politicians as well. In 1989 the Sámi people were granted their own parliament, the Sámediggi.

In 1992 the General Synod in the Church of Norway decided to establish an organ to oversee and work for the Sámi church life. In 1997 the General Synod acknowledged its role in the assimilation process and declared it would make good of its mistakes.

== Organisation ==
The council has seven members. One member is to be a bishop appointed by the Bishops’ Conference, and one appointed by the Sami Parliament. The General Synod elects five other members, among these there is to be a representative from some of the Sami languages in Norway (Southern Sami, Lule Sami and Northern Sami). The leader of the council is elected by the General Synod.

The Secretary General and the rest of the staff at the Secretariat of the council holds currently offices together with the Natioral Council of the Church of Norway in Oslo. A process to move the Secretariat is currently in motion. The current leader of the Sami Church Council is Tore Johnsen and the Secretary General is Rávdná Turi Henriksen (temporary constituted).

== Main aims of the council ==
According to the statutes of the Sami Church Council (KM 12/92) the main aims are:

- to further, protect and coordinate Sami church life in the Church of Norway
- to respond to issues that according to the council is of relevance to Sami church life or indigenous people
- to further knowledge of particular values that Sami church life and the heritage of Sami Christianity represents for the Church as a whole, and to work with issues the church needs to related to the Sami culture, tradition and history
- to contribute to the strengthening of the culture and language of the Sami population, and to further knowledge and commitment to the role of the Sami people in the Church of Norway.
- to care for relations with churches that has Sami congregations in Scandinavia and the Kola Peninsula, and to further work and coordination of issues that are of common interest of the Sami Christians
- to oversee the work with indigenous question, together with the Council on Ecumenical and International Relations on behalf of the Church of Norway.

== Leaders ==
- Nils Jernsletten (He was elected in 1992 as its first leader.)

== See also ==
- Church of Norway
- Sámi religion
- Sámi history
