= Royal Mausoleum (Norway) =

20th-century burial site in Oslo

Coordinates: 59°54′27″N 10°44′17″E

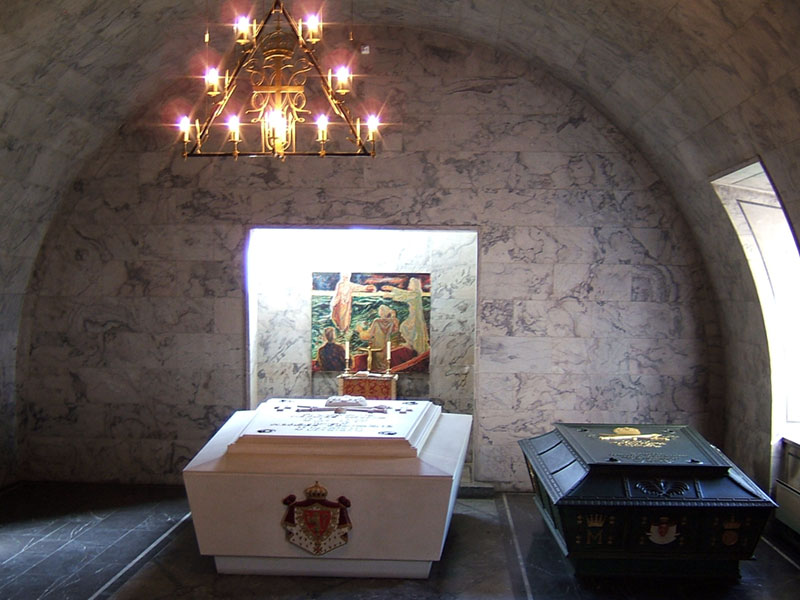
The Royal Mausoleum

The Royal Mausoleum in Oslo, Norway, is located within the Castle of Akershus, where it was established in 1948.

== Information ==
The Royal Mausoleum contains three sarcophagi: in a white sarcophagus of marble rest King Haakon VII of Norway (1872–1957) and Queen Maud of Norway (1869–1938), née Princess Maud of Wales, and in a green sarcophagus rest King Olav V of Norway (1903–1991) and Crown Princess Märtha of Norway (1901–1954), née Princess of Sweden. A third sarcophagus for King Harald V (1937–2026) has been placed following his state funeral and burial.

The Royal Mausoleum also contains, in its walls, the remains of King Haakon V of Norway (1270–1319) and Queen Euphemia of Norway (1270–1312), née von Rügen, as well as that of King Sigurd I of Norway (c. 1090–1130). The remains were transferred from St. Mary's Church and St. Hallvard's Cathedral, respectively, both in Oslo.

== Other burial sites ==
=== Kings ===
With few exceptions, burial sites or remains of Norwegian monarchs before 1380 have disappeared. Possible burial sites include the Nidaros Cathedral in Trondheim and either one or more churches in Bergen.

Nearly all Norwegian monarchs between 1380 and 1905 are buried abroad. Confirmed burial sites abroad include:

- Roskilde Cathedral in Roskilde, Denmark
- Riddarholmen Church in Stockholm, Sweden
- St. Peter's Cathedral in Schleswig, present-day Germany
- St. Mary's Church in Darłowo, present-day Poland

=== Petty kings ===
Predating the official list of Norwegian monarchs (872–present), a large number of petty kings and chieftains are buried in many parts of Norway. Some possible or confirmed burial sites include:

- Borre (Royal Cemetery), Vestfold
- Gokstad, Vestfold
- Oseberg, Vestfold

== See also ==
- Burial sites of European monarchs and consorts
