= The Blue Stone =

Monument in Bergen, Norway

Coordinates: 60.39188180133199°N 5.32289304856957°E

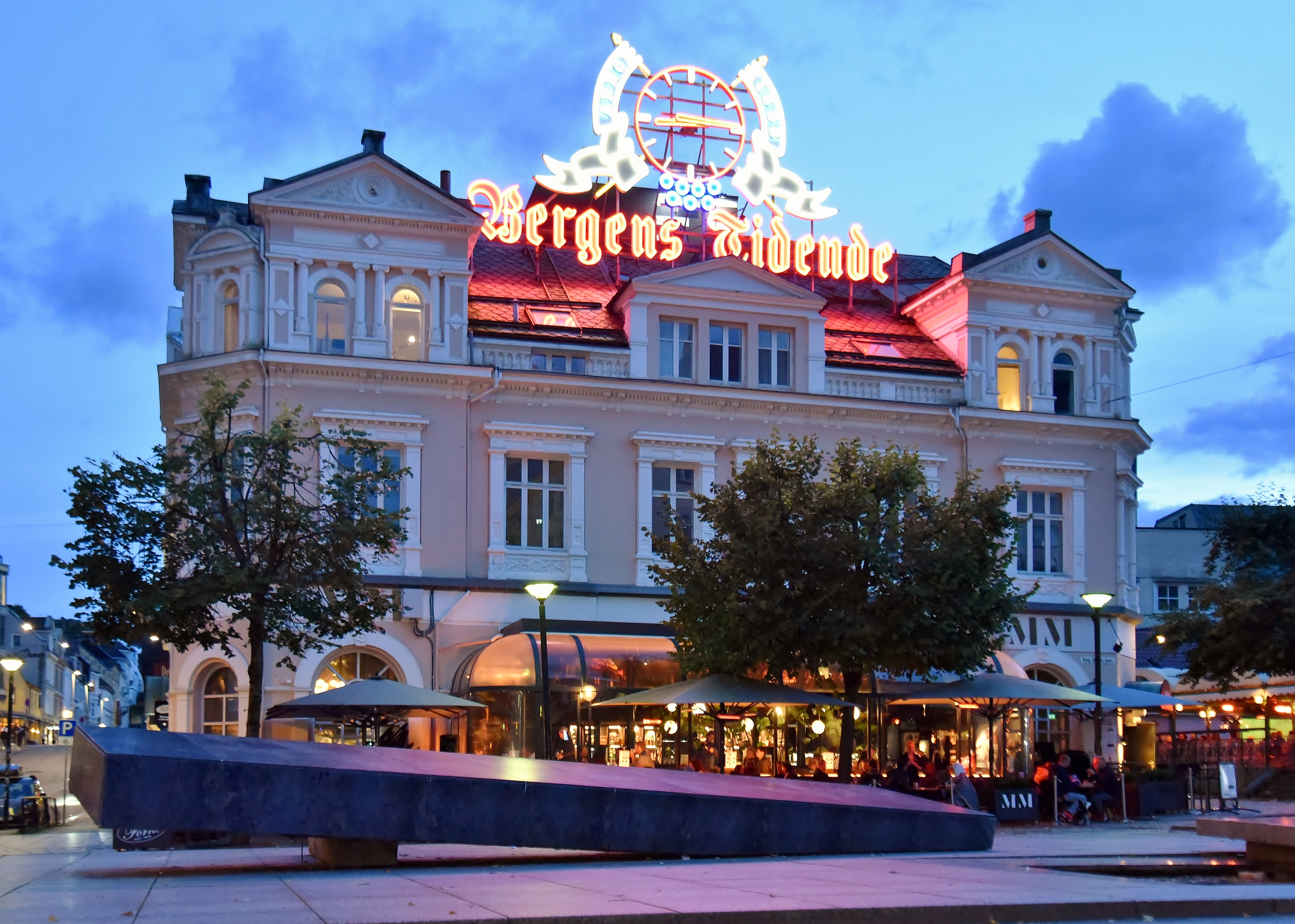
The Blue Stone in September 2019

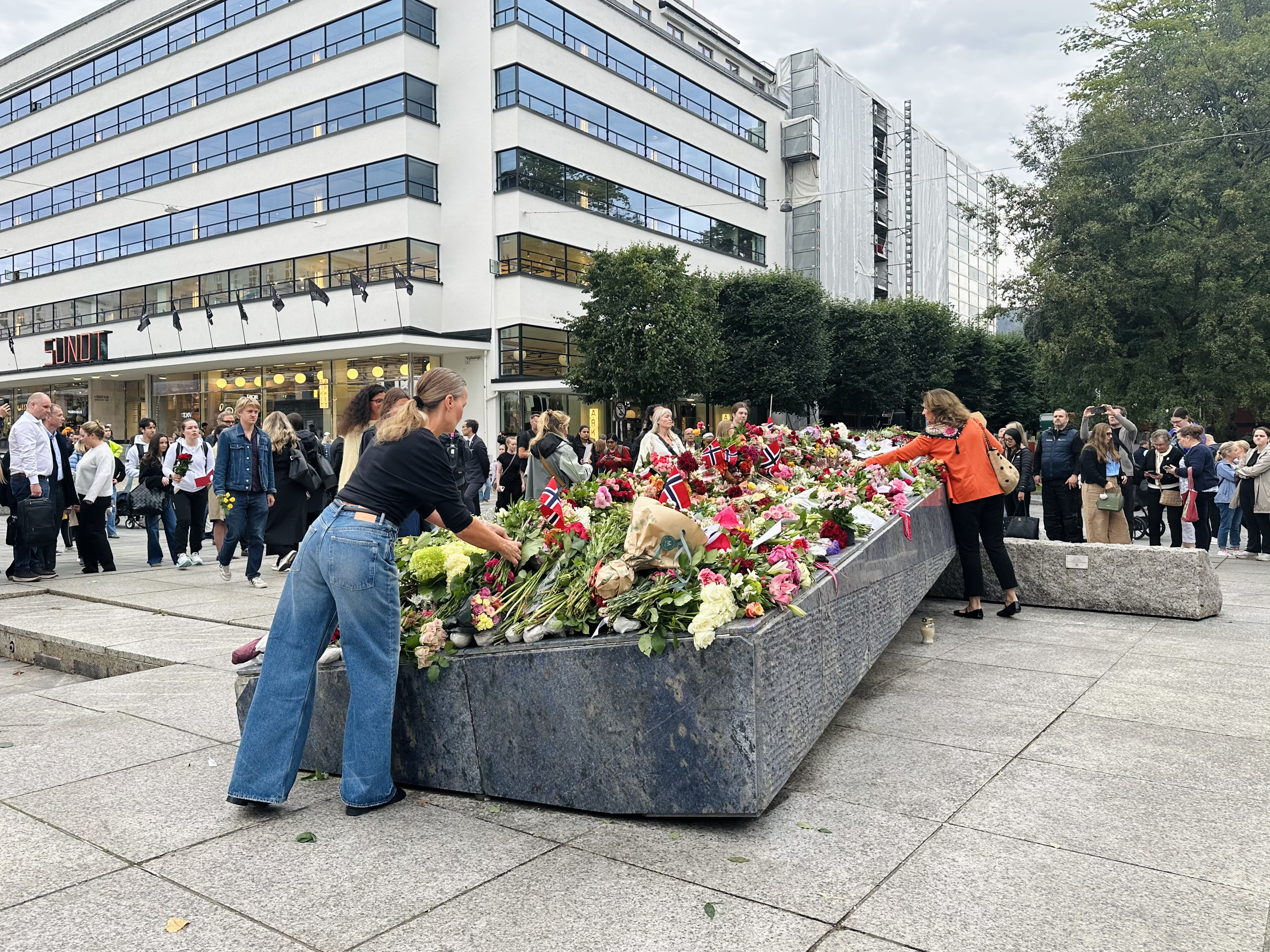
Commemoration of Harald V at The Blue Stone on the day of his passing in August 2026

The Blue Stone (Norwegian: Den blå stein) is a monument in the city of Bergen, Norway. The stone is nine meters (30 feet) long, and made of Brazilian sodalite. It is resting on a stone block, which gives it a characteristic inclination towards the northeast. The entire sculpture is placed on a larger foundation along with a smaller gray square stone sculpture that appears as a cover to an opening at the end of the foundation.

The monument was made by Asbjørn Andersen, and presented to the city 27 March 1993 as a gift from the Kavli Trust, who were celebrating their 100th anniversary.

The stone is located right next to the main square of Bergen, Torgallmenningen.
