= Slottskapellet (Oslo) =

Slottskapellet The Royal Palace Chapel
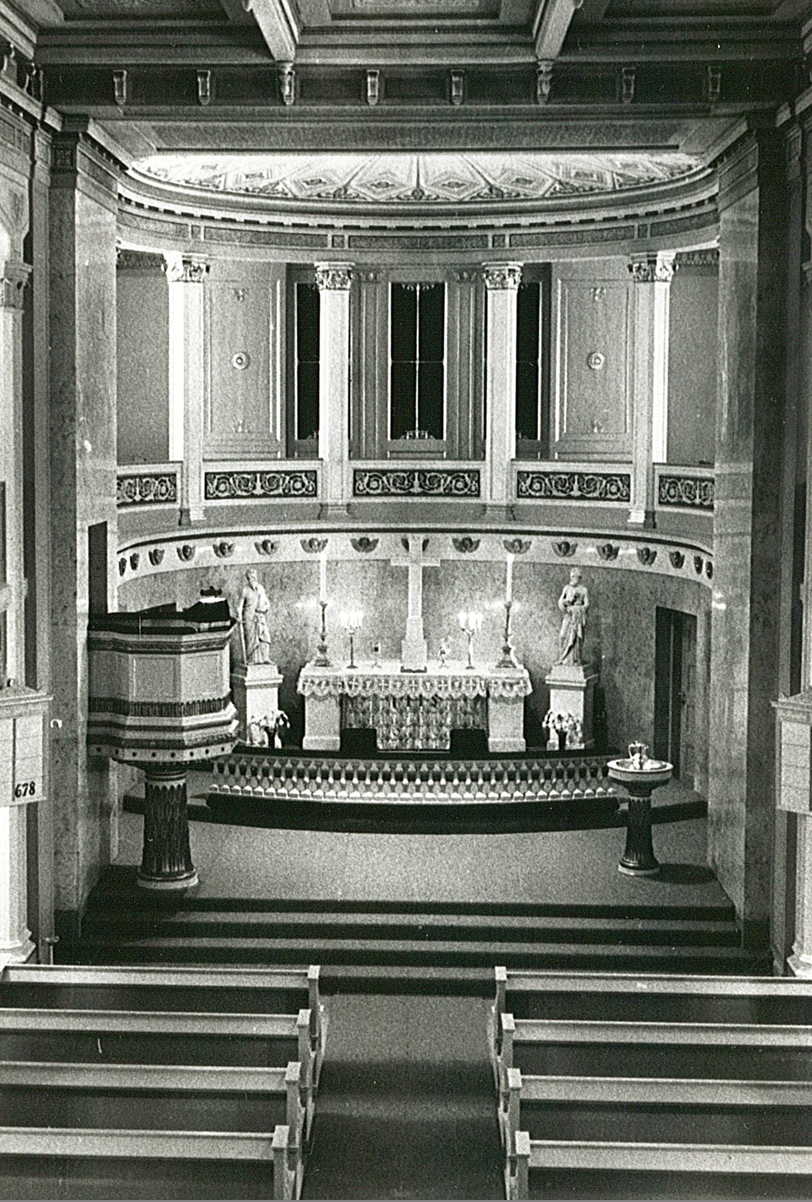
- Slottskapellet; The Royal Palace Chapel
- 59°55′1.2″N 10°43′40.2″E
- Location: Royal Palace, Oslo,
- Country: Norway
- Denomination: Church of Norway
- Churchmanship: Evangelical Lutheran

History
- Status: Royal Palace Chapel
- Consecrated: 1848

Architecture
- Architect: Hans Ditlev Franciscus Linstow

Specifications
- Capacity: 150

Administration
- Diocese: Diocese of Oslo
- Deanery: Oslo arch-deanery

Slottskapellet (The Royal Palace Chapel) is a chapel in the Royal Palace in Oslo, Norway. It is the scene of many events of the Norwegian royal family like the royal baptisms and confirmations, in addition to church concerts and chamber music concerts. Slottskapellet is used for worships for students as well, a tradition of more than a hundred years of history.

The palace architect Linstow designed the nave and choir in Berlin in 1837. The Royal Chapel has side aisles with galleries supported by six pillars on either side. The pillars, galleries and roof are made of wood. The richly decorated ceiling was painted by Peder Wergmann in 1843.

The dados along the side aisles feature plaster reliefs of the four evangelists by the sculptor Hans Michelsen. The wall behind the altar with a gilded cross in the middle is made of pink stucco marble and the church organ is located in the gallery above. Olav Glosimodt has created the marble figures showing the apostles Peter and Paul. The pulpit is white and gold.

The Royal Chapel was restored in 2004.

Slottskapellet is a part of the Royal Palace's guided tour program in the summer.
