= Morten Strand =

Norwegian footballer and politician (born 1947)

Morten Strand (born 23 September 1947) is a Norwegian footballer and politician for the Conservative Party.

He hails from Bekkestua in Bærum, but now resides in Vollen. In his younger days he was a football goalkeeper for Stabæk, from 1965 to 1974, and Strømsgodset from 1975 to 1976. He has later been involved in the local football club Vollen UL. In his professional career he was a CEO of the paper company Basberg Papir. He was a deputy leader of the Norwegian Wholesale Paper Merchants Association and a board member of the Federation of Norwegian Commercial and Service Enterprises for many years.

Strand was first elected to Asker municipal council in 1983, and was mayor of Asker municipality from 1995 to 2007. He served as a deputy representative to the Norwegian Parliament from Akershus during the terms 2001–2005 and 2005–2009. He was also involved in the Norwegian Association of Local and Regional Authorities.

Political offices
Preceded by Eyvind W. Wang	Mayor of Asker; 1995–2007	Succeeded by Lene Conradi
