= Jens Wisløff =

Norwegian politician (1921–1998)

Jens Juell Wisløff (9 May 1921 – 4 August 1998) was a Norwegian businessman in the asphalt industry and a politician for the Conservative Party.

== Political career ==
He was born in Sarpsborg, and resided in Nesbru in his later life. He was a member of the executive committee of Asker municipal council from 1968 to 1975, and chaired the municipal party chapter from 1971 to 1973. Ahead of the 1979 election, he tried to be nominated as the Conservative Party mayor candidate, but lost out to Eyvind W. Wang. He served as a deputy representative to the Norwegian Parliament from Akershus during the 1969–1973 term.

== Professional career ==
Wisløff completed his education at the Norwegian Institute of Technology in 1944, and was the CEO of the Sigurd Hesselberg from 1945 to 1973. From 1973 to 1984, he worked as the chair of Veidekke. He was also the chair of Vestfjorden Avløpsselskap for fifteen years. The company Sigurd Hesselberg was later incorporated into Veidekke in 1989.

Wisløff chaired the publicity body Opplysningsrådet for Veitrafikken from 1976 to 1989, and the employers' associations Asfaltentreprenørenes Forening and the European Asphalt Pavement Association. He helped found both these organizations. From 1980 to 1990, he was the deputy chairman of the Norwegian branch of the Nordic Road Association. He received an honorary prize from this organization in 1993, and became an honorary member in 1994. In an obituary, he was called "the grand old man of asphalt".

In late 1986, around the time when the Oslo Package 1 was planned, Wisløff surprised many by supporting an increase in the duties on gasoline. The reason was to avoid toll plazas in Greater Oslo in general, specifically those planned by Fjellinjen. Toll plazas would create congestion, and their administration would be too costly, Wisløff feared. Gasoline duty was a hot issue in Norwegian politics at the time, as the second cabinet of Kåre Willoch—a fellow Conservative politician—had fallen on a vote of confidence, as the Labour and Progress Party opposed the cabinet's proposed increase of such duties. Wisløff's suggestion came as a response to the new Minister of Transport, Labour's Kjell Borgen, who recently—shortly after assuming office—had suggested a small increase.

A devout Christian, Wisløff was a member of the Diocese Council of Oslo in the 1960s and chaired the YMCA Scouts of Norway from 1958 to 1962. He was also the chair of the Asker Museum for twelve years. During his period, Labråten, the home of Arne and Hulda Garborg, was incorporated into the museum. Preserving it was a "task ... for the entire Norwegian people", he proclaimed. He received the Cultural Award of Asker municipality in 1998.
