= Otto Valstad =

Norwegian educator, painter, book illustrator and children's writer

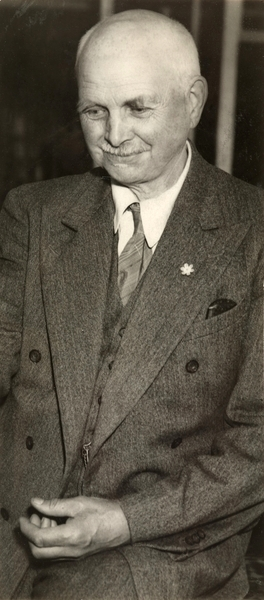
- Otto Valstad, c. 1938
- Born: 11 December 1862; Asker, Norway
- Died: 20 June 1950 (aged 87)
- Occupations: educator, painter, book illustrator and children's writer
- Known for: He and his wife were avid art collectors and their home in Hvalstad became a cultural centre.
- Spouse: Tilla Valstad

Otto Valstad (11 December 1862 – 20 June 1950) was a Norwegian educator, painter, book illustrator and children's writer.

== Biography ==
He was born at Asker in Akershus, Norway. He was the son of Andreas Olsen Valstad (1828–1911) and Lisa Johansdatter Solstad (1836–1906). Valstad was an elementary school teacher until 1899. From the 1880s, he painted, especially landscapes, portraits and popular genres. He was a student at the Norwegian National Academy of Craft and Art Industry under Johan Nordhagen and later briefly attended Académie Julian in Paris during 1897.

In 1893, he married novelist Mathilde Georgine "Tilla" Valstad (1871–1957). Otto and Tilla Valstad were avid art collectors and their home in Hvalstad became a cultural centre. In 1949, they willed their property to Asker municipality. His works are displayed at Asker Museum together with an extensive collection of art and cultural-historical objects.

Among his books are Juletræet from 1891, Smaakarer from 1910, Ola Enfoldig from 1916 and Ola Mangfoldig from 1923. He is represented in the National Gallery of Norway with the portrait Fru Lina Brun from 1901.
