= Tilla Valstad =

Norwegian teacher, novelist and journalist (1871–1957)

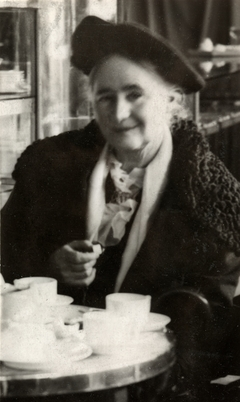
- Born: 30 July 1871; Tønsberg, Norway
- Died: 5 August 1957 (aged 86)
- Occupations: Schoolteacher; Journalist; Novelist
- Spouse: Otto Valstad

Mathilde Georgine "Tilla" Valstad (30 July 1871 – 5 August 1957) was a Norwegian teacher, novelist and journalist.

== Biography ==
Tilla Valstad was born at Tønsberg in Vestfold, Norway. She was the daughter of ship owner Johan Henrik Christiansen (1823–1904) and Mathilde Georgine Hvistendahl (1834–1911). She graduated at Hartvig Nissen School in Kristiania (now Oslo) in 1889 and then began working as a teacher at Tønsberg. In 1893 she married Otto Valstad (1862-1952), who was also a teacher in Tønsberg. In 1899 the couple moved to her husband's home at Hvalstad in Asker.

Tilla Valstad was a teacher at Vaterland School at Vaterland in Kristiania from 1898 to 1920, and was the first woman in Kristiania who worked as a teacher after being married. In 1920, the couple started an open-air school which offered outdoor activities and education to disadvantaged and sick children from Kristiania. Otto and Tilla Valstad were avid art collectors and their home in Hvalstad became a cultural centre. In 1949, they willed their property to Asker municipality. It now forms part of Asker Museum and contains their extensive collection of art and cultural-historical objects.

Her literary debut was Et år i Vaterland from 1925. Her main literary work is the trilogy Teodora, Teodora kommer hjem and Men størst av alt er kjærlighet, published between 1933 and 1941.
