= Skaugum =

Residence of the Norwegian monarch

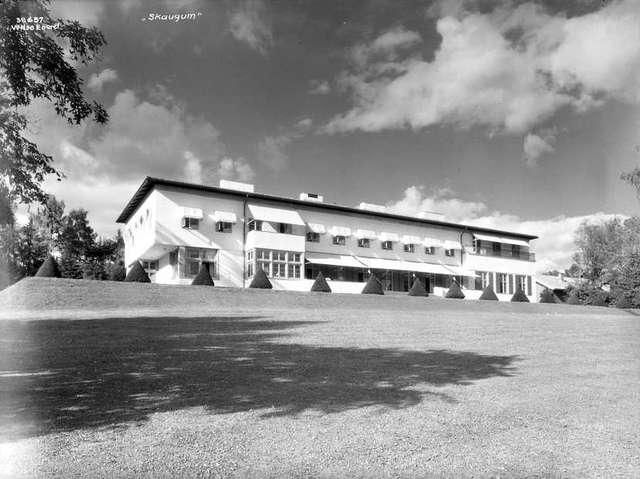
- Skaugum in 1932

- Location within Norway

General information
- Type: Manor
- Architectural style: Functionalism
- Location: Asker, Norway
- Coordinates: 59°51′14.74″N 10°26′34.95″E
- Completed: 1932
- Owner: Norwegian royal family

Design and construction
- Architect: Arnstein Arneberg

Skaugum is an estate, manor house and the private residence of King Haakon VIII and his wife, Queen Mette-Marit. The estate is located in Asker, 19 km (12 mi) southwest of Oslo, by the foot of the mountain Skaugumsåsen. The estate consists of 48 ha (120 acres) of agricultural lands and 50 ha (120 acres) of woodlands.

== History ==
The estate was originally Church property during the Middle Ages, and passed through several owners until 1909, when Fritz Wedel Jarlsberg bought it. When Crown Prince Olav and Crown Princess Märtha were married in 1929, Wedel-Jarlsberg sold it to the couple. In 1937, Prince Harald was born on the estate.

Wedel-Jarlsberg's Swiss chalet style-residence, designed by Herman Backer and completed in 1891, burned to the ground in 1930. The Norwegian architect Arnstein Arneberg was commissioned to design a new structure, entirely on the foundations of the old building. The new building was also built of stone to avoid future fires.

=== Second World War ===
During the Nazi occupation of Norway, SS-General Wilhelm Rediess resided at Skaugum for a short period; Reichskommissar Josef Terboven made the estate his official residence in June 1940. Shortly after Hitler's death, Terboven was dismissed from his position by Karl Dönitz and committed suicide in the manor bunker on 8 May 1945 by blowing himself up with fifty kilograms of dynamite.

=== Residence of the heir apparent ===
In 1968, King Olav V gave the estate as a wedding gift to his son Crown Prince Harald (later King Harald V) and his wife, Crown Princess Sonja, while the King himself relocated to the Royal Palace in Oslo. King Harald would repeat this gesture, giving the estate as a wedding gift to his son, Crown Prince Haakon (later King Haakon VIII), and his wife, Crown Princess Mette-Marit, when the couple married in 2001.

Unlike the Royal Palace and Oscarshall, Skaugum is owned privately by the royal family and is therefore not open to the public. Like all royal residences in Norway, the estate is protected by the Royal Guards.

=== Høiby affair ===
The property occupies a central role in the Høiby affair, where Marius Borg Høiby is alleged to have raped women in the cellar of the main house and hosted so-called "Skaugum festivals" with criminal friends there, where drugs were distributed and consumed.

Jan Bøhler wrote that "organized crime is today a greater threat to our country than terrorism, and we are allocating increasingly larger resources to combat it. At the same time, a member of the royal family has for years allegedly vacationed and partied with central figures in drug-related crime. Individuals allegedly known for involvement in serious money laundering cases and violent gangs, have also participated in the festivities."

In 2025, it was revealed that the police would investigate Høiby for sexual abuse that he was alleged to have committed in the cellar of Skaugum.

== Gallery ==
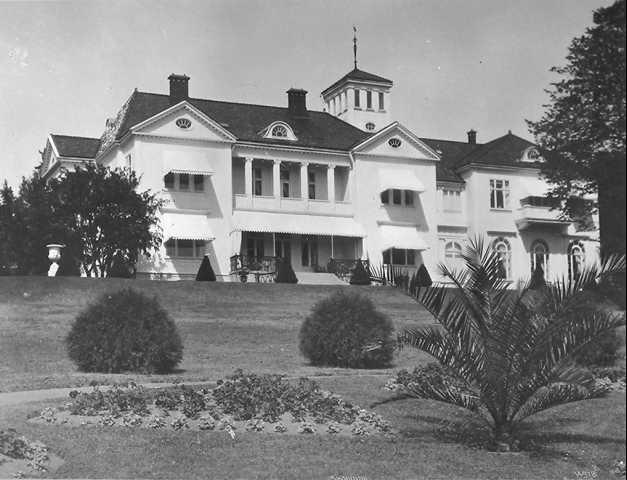
The original Skaugum building prior to the fire in 1930

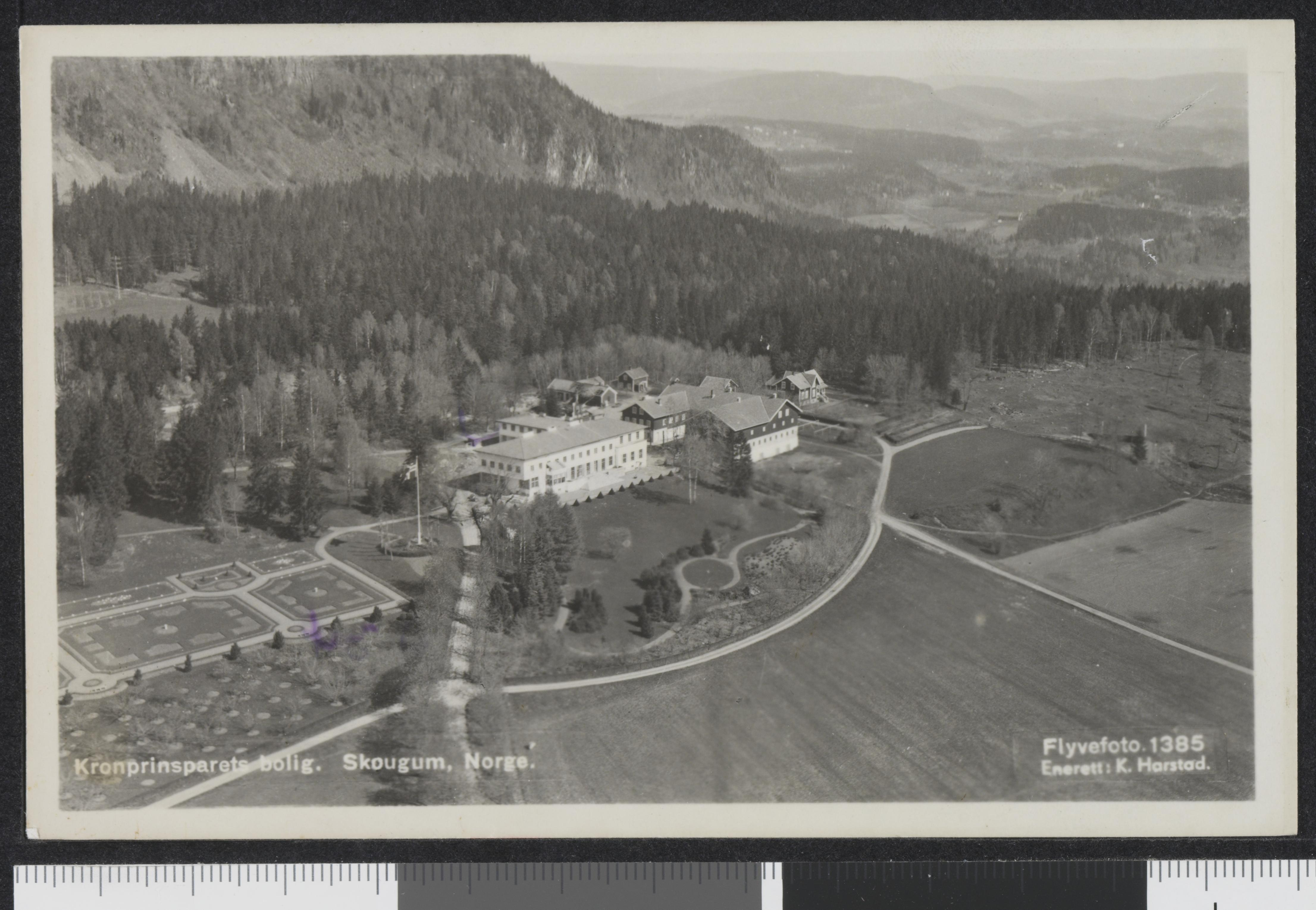
Aerial view of Skaugum

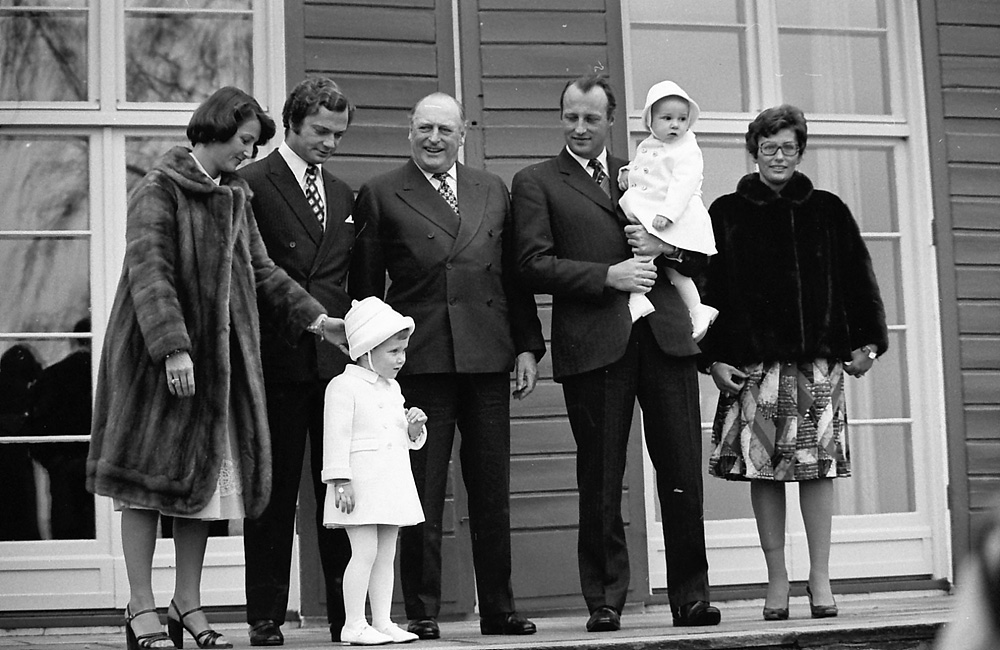
The royal family at Skaugum during a 1974 visit from Carl XVI Gustaf of Sweden

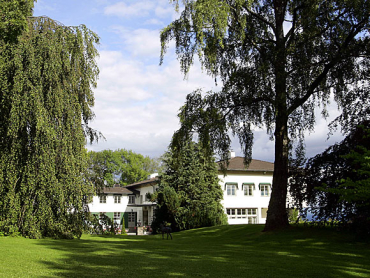
Skaugum seen from the estate garden

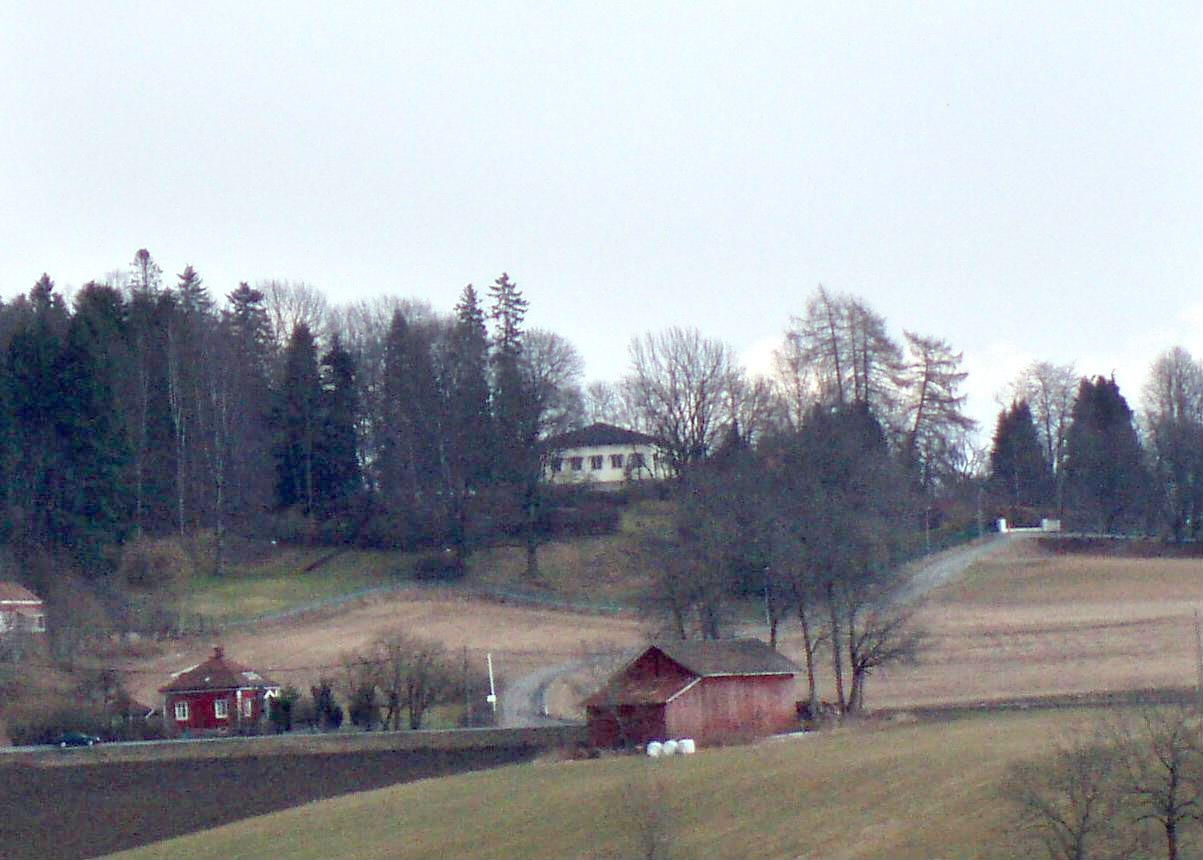
Skaugum seen from the west

== See also ==
- Semsvannet and vicinity - millennial site
- List of official residences
