= Jon Fossum =

Norwegian orienteer and politician

Jon Fossum (23 February 1923 – 10 July 2007) was a Norwegian orienteer and politician for the Conservative Party.

He was born at Hvalstad. In his younger days he was an active sportsman, representing Asker SK. In addition to ski jumping and cross-country skiing, he competed in orienteering. In the latter sport he won five national championships; three of which in relay races with his two brothers.

Fossum was first elected to Asker municipal council in 1963, and was mayor of Asker municipality from 1968 to 1980. He was also a five-term member of Akershus county council. He served as a deputy representative to the Norwegian Parliament from Akershus during the term 1965–1969. During his time as mayor, Asker experienced population growth; also the company Vestfjorden Avløpsselskap was formed.

In 2008 a road at Vakås was named after him.

Political offices
Preceded by Arne Skaare	Mayor of Asker; 1968–1980	Succeeded by Eyvind W. Wang
