= Eyvind W. Wang =

Norwegian politician (1942–2024)

Eyvind W. Wang (8 December 1942 – 3 August 2024) was a Norwegian politician for the Conservative Party.

== Life and career ==
Wang was from Blommenholm in Bærum and started his career as a car mechanic. He became a workshop manager at car dealership Skotvedt and later served on its board of directors. He was also a chairman of Vestfjorden Avløpsselskap.

Wang was first elected to Asker municipal council in 1975 and served as mayor of Asker from 1980 to 1995. In 1979 he defeated fellow party member Jens Wisløff for reelection. Wang was later succeeded by Morten Strand from the same party. Wang also served as a deputy representative to the Norwegian Parliament from Akershus from 1993 to 1997. He met during seven days of parliamentary session. He has also chaired the Akershus Conservative Party chapter and has been a member of the central party committee.

Wang died from a brain haemorrhage at Bærum Hospital, on 3 August 2024, at the age of 81.

Political offices
| Preceded by Jon Fossum | Mayor of Asker; 1980–1995 | Succeeded by Morten Strand |
