= Asker Municipality (1838–2020) =

Asker Municipality Asker kommune
- Former municipality
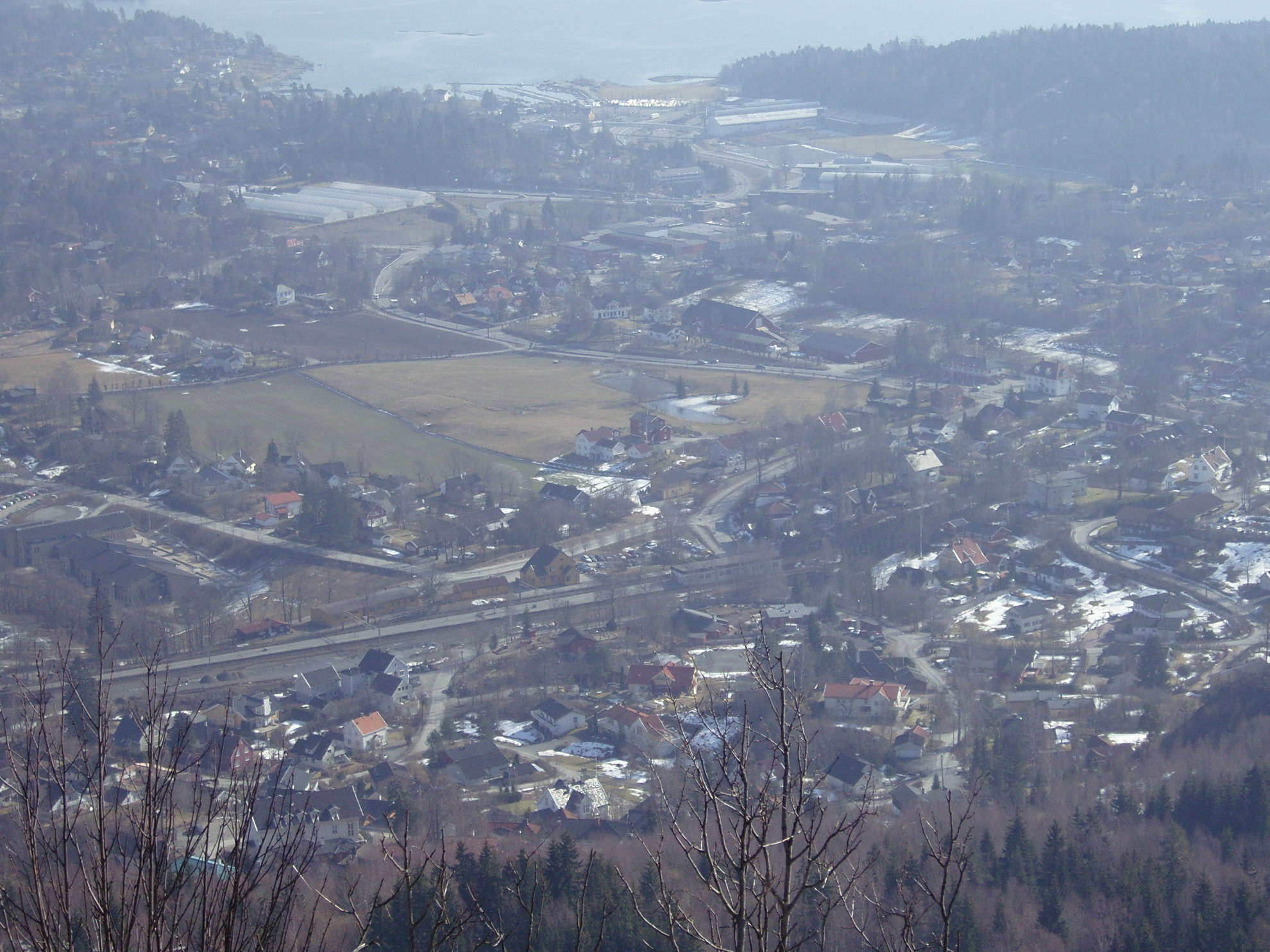

- Coat of arms

- Akershus within Norway

- Asker within Akershus
- Coordinates: 59°50′7″N 10°26′6″E
- Country: Norway
- County: Akershus
- Administrative centre: Asker

Government
  - Mayor (2007): Lene Conradi (H)

Area (upon dissolution)
  - Total: 101 km^{2} (39 sq mi)
  - Land: 97 km^{2} (37 sq mi)
  - Rank: #385 in Norway

Population (30 September 2019)
  - Total: 61,906 ▲
  - Rank: #11 in Norway
  - Density: 585/km^{2} (1,520/sq mi)
  - Change (10 years): ▲ +15.7%
- Demonym: Askerbøring

Official language
  - Norwegian form: Bokmål
- Time zone: UTC+01:00 (CET)
  - Summer (DST): UTC+02:00 (CEST)
- ISO 3166 code: NO-0220
- Website: Official website

Historical population
Year	Pop.	±%
1951	13,625	—
1961	17,755	+30.3%
1971	31,702	+78.6%
1981	35,977	+13.5%
1991	41,903	+16.5%
2001	49,661	+18.5%
2011	55,284	+11.3%
2014	59,037	+6.8%
2021?	63,381	+7.4%
2031?	69,296	+9.3%
Source: Statistics Norway.

Asker (Norwegian: Asker), also called Asker proper (Askerbygda or gamle Asker in Norwegian), is a district and former municipality in Akershus, Norway, located approximately 20km southwest of Oslo. From 2020 it is part of the larger administrative municipality Asker (also known as Greater Asker) together with the traditional Buskerud districts Røyken and Hurum; Asker constitutes the northern fourth and is part of the Greater Oslo Region. The administrative center was the town of Asker, which remains so for the new larger municipality. Asker was established as a parish in the Middle Ages and as a municipality on 1 January 1838.

== History ==
Since the Middle Ages, the Asker parish consisted of the areas that later became the municipalities of Asker and Bærum. In the 19th century, Bærum was divided into the parishes of Vestre Bærum and Østre Bærum, while Asker and Bærum were also established as separate municipalities.

In 2020, Asker merged with Røyken and Hurum to form Asker Municipality, a larger administrative region than traditional/geographical Asker. The newly-formed Asker Municipality was made part of Viken County immediately following the 2020 merge. However, Viken dissolved on 1 January 2024, returning Asker (with the addition of Røyken and Hurum) to the county of Akershus.

== Name ==
The municipality (originally the parish) is named after the old Asker farm since the first church was built here. The name (Old Norse: Askar) is the plural form of ask which means "ash tree".

== Coat-of-arms ==
The coat-of-arms is from modern times. They were granted on 7 October 1975. The arms show a green background with three silver-colored tree trunks (Norwegian: askekaller) and are thus canting arms. The trees are ashes, which were cropped every year to provide food for the animals. The trees thus developed after many years a very typical shape, which was characteristic for the area.

== Place of the Millennium ==
In 1998, just before the millennium, the 'Askerbøringer' (the inhabitants of Asker) elected the beautiful area of Semsvannet including the mountain ridge Skaugumsåsen – to be their Place of the Millennium.

== Geography ==
Its main parts are Asker, Gullhella, Vollen, Vettre, Blakstad, Bleiker, Borgen, Drengsrud, Dikemark, Vardåsen, Engelsrud, Holmen, Høn, Hvalstad, Billingstad, Nesøya, Nesbru, and Heggedal. Asker is a coastal place with many beaches, but also contains hills and woods. The district is known for many important businesses. It is also known for gardening. The Skaugum estate, where Haakon VIII lives with his family, is situated here. The first IKEA store outside of Sweden opened at Slependen in Asker in 1963. There are many hiking/ sightseeing spots around Asker; such as Semsvannet lake and Drengsrud cultural path around the area.

== Municipality reform ==
As part of the municipality reform process instigated by Minister of Local Government Jan Tore Sanner the municipalities of Asker, Hurum, and Røyken evaluated if they should merge into a new common municipality during the first half of 2016. A tentative agreement was reached and on 16 June 2016 the Municipal Council of Røyken approved the merger with Asker and Hurum with 24 votes for and 3 against. On 14 June 2016 the Municipal Council of Asker also approved the merger with 42 votes for and 5 against. A few days later the Municipal Council of Hurum followed suit and approved the merger. The proposed merger date was 1 January 2020 and the new name will be Asker. Asker was merged with the municipalities of Røyken and Hurum as of 1 January 2020.

== Minorities ==
Number of minorities (1st and 2nd generation) in Asker by country of origin in 2017
Ancestry	Number
Poland	1,870
Sweden	846
Somalia	562
India	506
Pakistan	486
Lithuania	461
Iran	451
Denmark	435
United Kingdom	348
Philippines	346
Germany	343
Iraq	307
Afghanistan	287
Russia	267
Eritrea	230

== Culture ==
Although Asker is principally a rural municipality, the expansion of Oslo has resulted in its becoming an affluent suburb. Thus numerous celebrities now reside in the area. According to SSB (Statistics Norway), Asker ranks as the 2nd wealthiest municipality in Norway based on median household income.

=== Sports ===
Asker is also the home of the sports club IF Frisk Asker; the club won the Norwegian Hockey championship in 1975, 1979, 2002, and 2019. Asker Skiklubb is the largest sports club in Norway. It has a long history dating back to 1889. Many of Asker's famous people have been successful individuals associated with the sports club.

The city is the home of Asker svømmeklubb. Asker women's football club has been home to many international players including four who played in the 2007 FIFA Women's World Cup in China.

=== Politics ===
Asker is politically dominated by the conservatives, and the mayor is Lene Conradi who represents the Conservative Party of Norway (Høyre).

=== Church ===
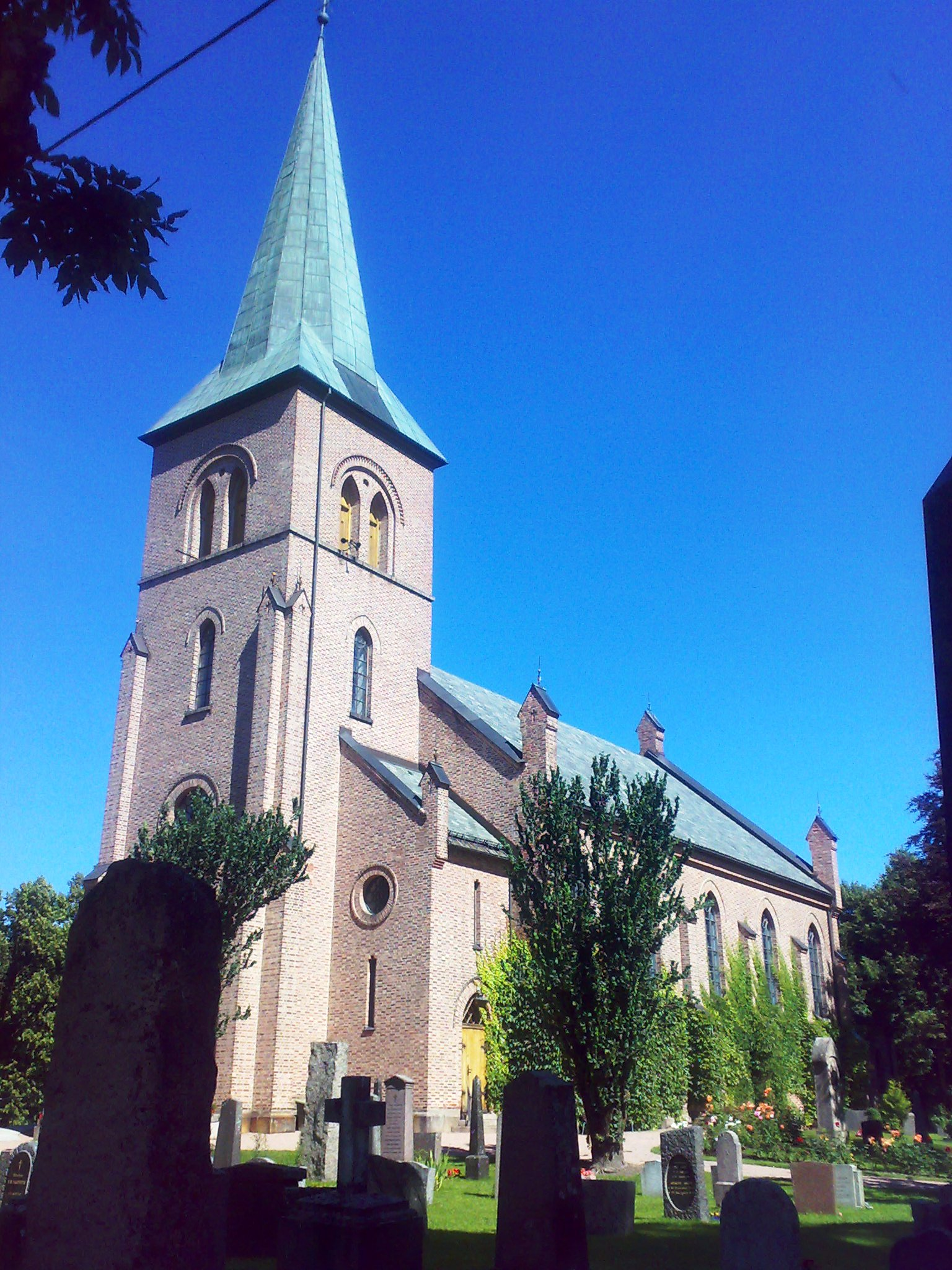
Asker Church

Asker Church (Asker Kirke) is located not far from Skaugum in Asker. The neo-Gothic red brick church was built in 1879 based upon designs by architect Jacob Wilhelm Nordan. The church renovation in 1930 was led by the architects Gudolf Blakstad and Herman Munthe-Kaas. Architect Arnstein Arneberg was in charge of the renovation in the 1950s. The church was the site of the wedding of Princess Ragnhild and Erling Lorentzen in 1953. The statue of Crown Princess Märtha in front of the church was designed by sculptor Dyre Vaa in 1957.

== Maud ==
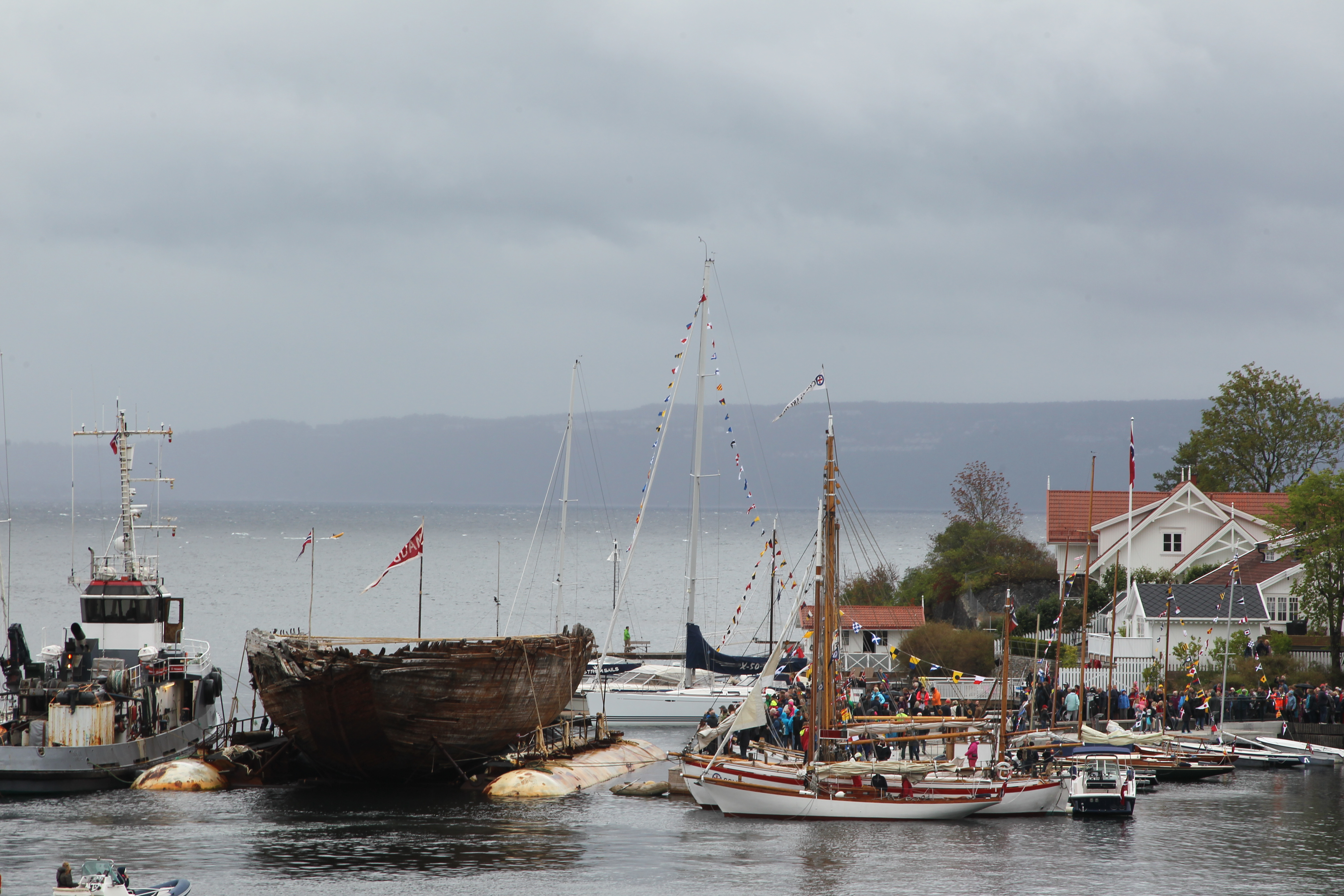
Maud at Vollen on 18 August 2018

In 1916 (or 1917) the Arctic expedition ship Maud was built in nearby Vollen and launched into Oslofjord. The ship was designed and built especially for Roald Amundsen and sailed through the Northeast Passage between 1918 and 1924. Sold to the Hudson's Bay Company as the supply vessel Baymaud she sank at Cambridge Bay, Northwest Territories (now Nunavut), Canada in 1930. In 1990, the ship was sold by the Hudson's Bay Company to Asker town with the expectation that she would be returned there; however, the export permit expired due to the 230 million kroner () cost to repair and move the ship. In 2011 a new project was commenced to salvage Maud and transport her to a new museum to be built at Vollen.

On 31 July 2016 it was reported that the hull of Maud had been raised to the surface and placed on a barge in preparation for shipment to Norway. In August 2017 Maud began the journey back to Norway; she was towed through the Northwest Passage. In September 2017 she arrived in Greenland to stay for the winter. Maud arrived in Bergen on 6 August 2018, finally returning to Norway nearly a century after her departure with Amundsen. She was then towed along the Norwegian coast, and arrived at Vollen on 18 August.

== Media ==
=== Magazines ===
- Development Today

== Notable residents ==
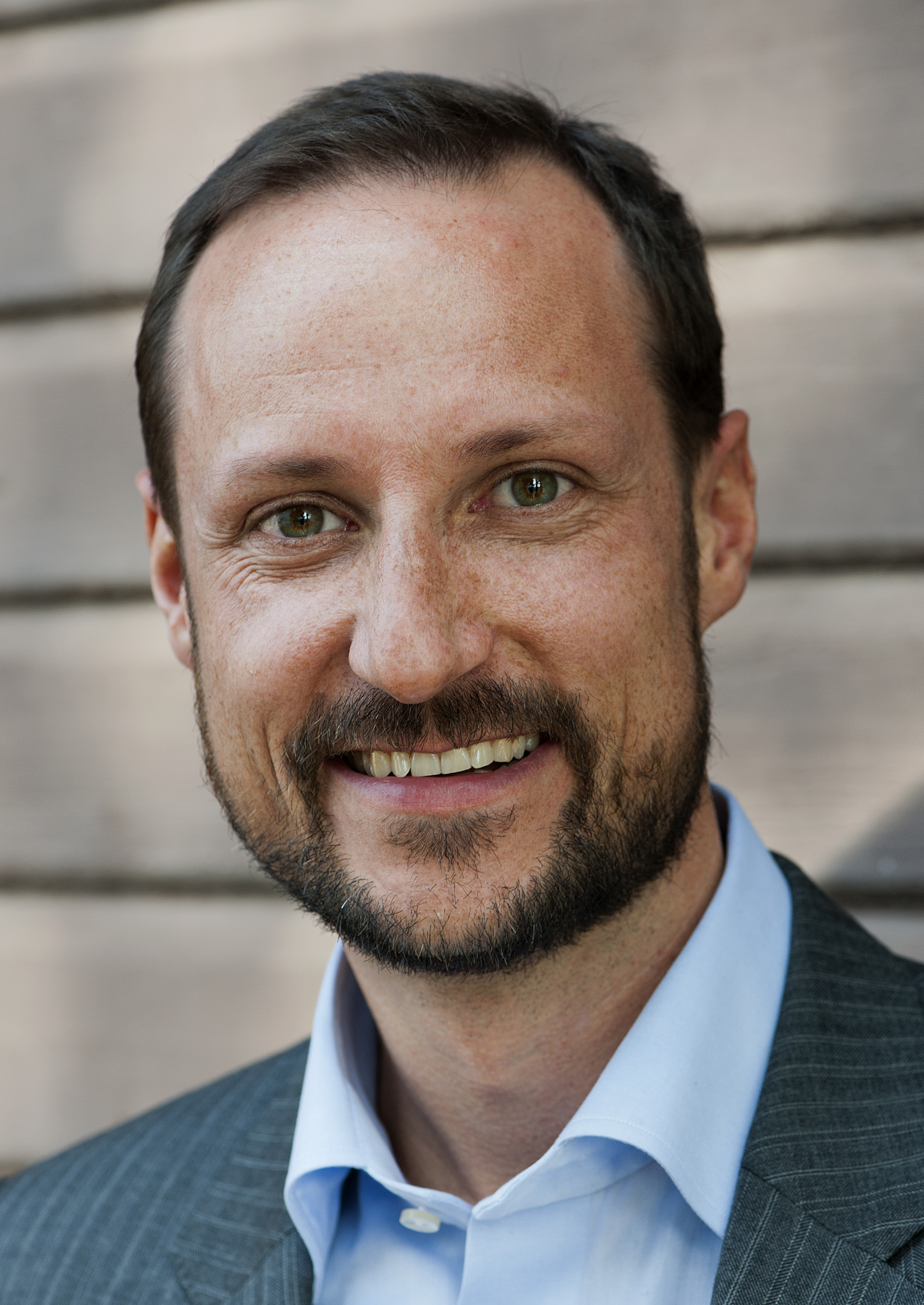
Then-Crown Prince Haakon of Norway, 2012

=== Royalty ===
- Haakon VIII (born 1973) the family lives in Skaugum
- Queen Mette-Marit of Norway (born 1973)
- Ingrid Alexandra, Crown Princess of Norway (born 2004)
- Prince Sverre Magnus of Norway (born 2005)

=== Public service ===
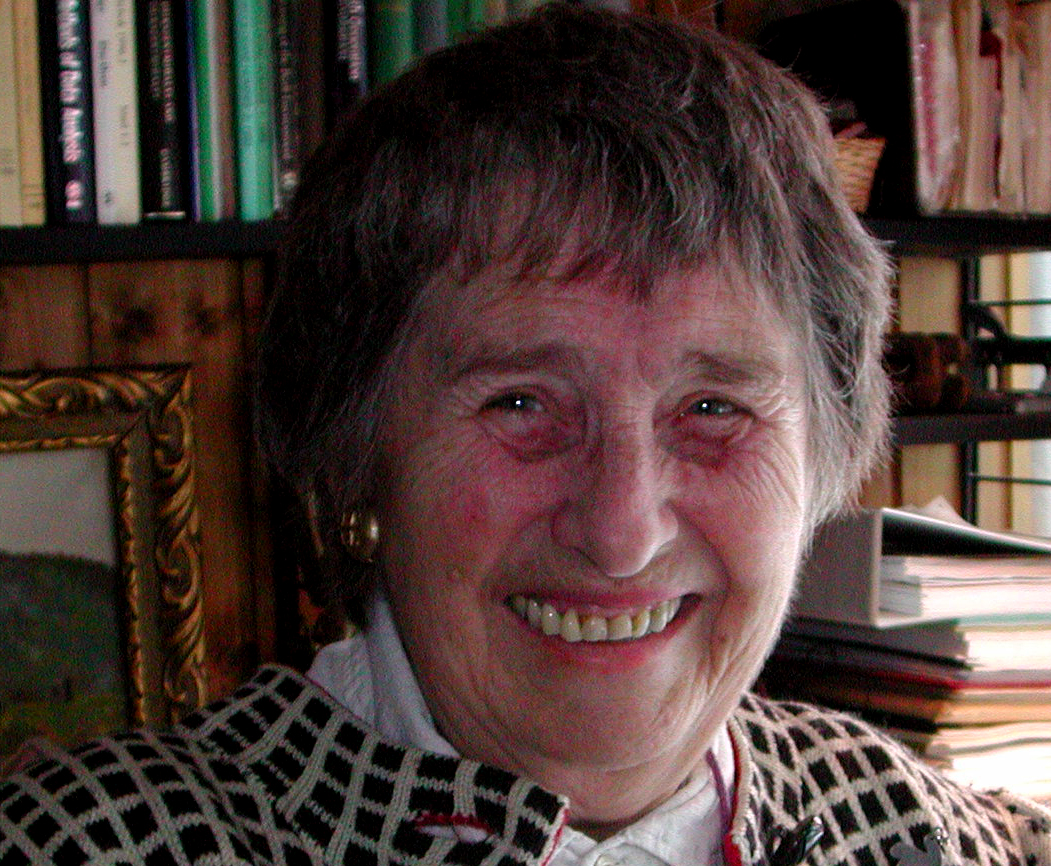
Berit Ås, 2004

- Einar Gerhardsen (1897 in Asker – 1987) Prime Minister of Norway 1940s to 1960s
- Dagny Berger (1903 in Asker – 1950) Norway's first woman aviator
- Anders Lange (1904 in Nordstrand – 1974), politician, founded the Progress Party (Norway)
- Arne Skaare (1907-1981) politician, Mayor of Asker municipality from 1956 to 1967
- Jens Evensen (1917–2004 in Asker), Norwegian lawyer, judge, politician, member of the International Law Commission and judge at the International Court of Justice in The Hague
- Hans Christen Mamen (1919 in Asker – 2009) a resistance member, local historian and priest
- Sverre Bergh (1920 in Asker – 2006) an engineer and spy in Nazi Germany during WWII
- Erik Gjems-Onstad, MBE (1922–2011) resistance member and lawyer; lived in Hvalstad
- Jon Fossum (1923 in Hvalstad – 2007) orienteer and Mayor of Asker municipality 1968/80
- Berit Ås (born 1928) former Asker councilor, psychologist, and feminist
- Jan Martin Larsen (born 1938) cartographer, orienteer and Asker councilor 1995 to 2007
- Eyvind W. Wang (born 1942) politician, Mayor of Asker 1980 to 1995, and car mechanic
- Morten Strand (born 1947) politician, Mayor of Asker 1995 to 2007, and footballer
- Valgerd Svarstad Haugland (born 1956) politician, county Governor of Oslo and Akershus 2011/18
- Beate Gangås (born 1963 in Asker) LGBT Oslo Chief of Police

=== Art ===
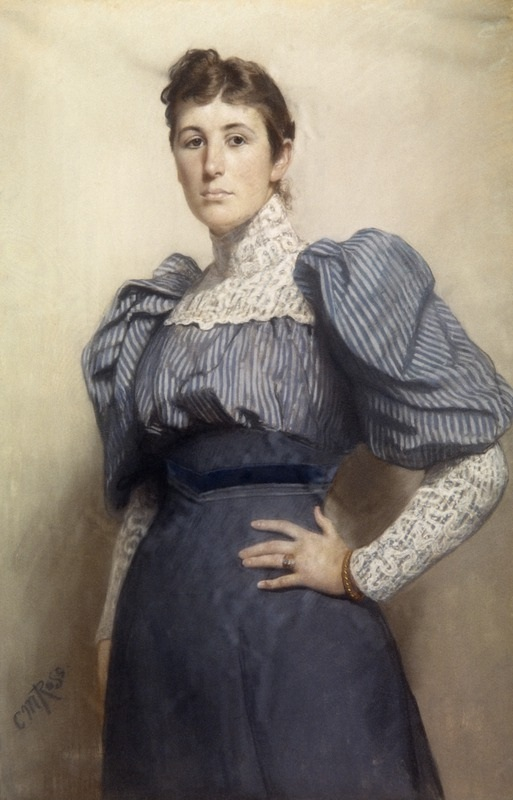
Nini Roll Anker, 1892

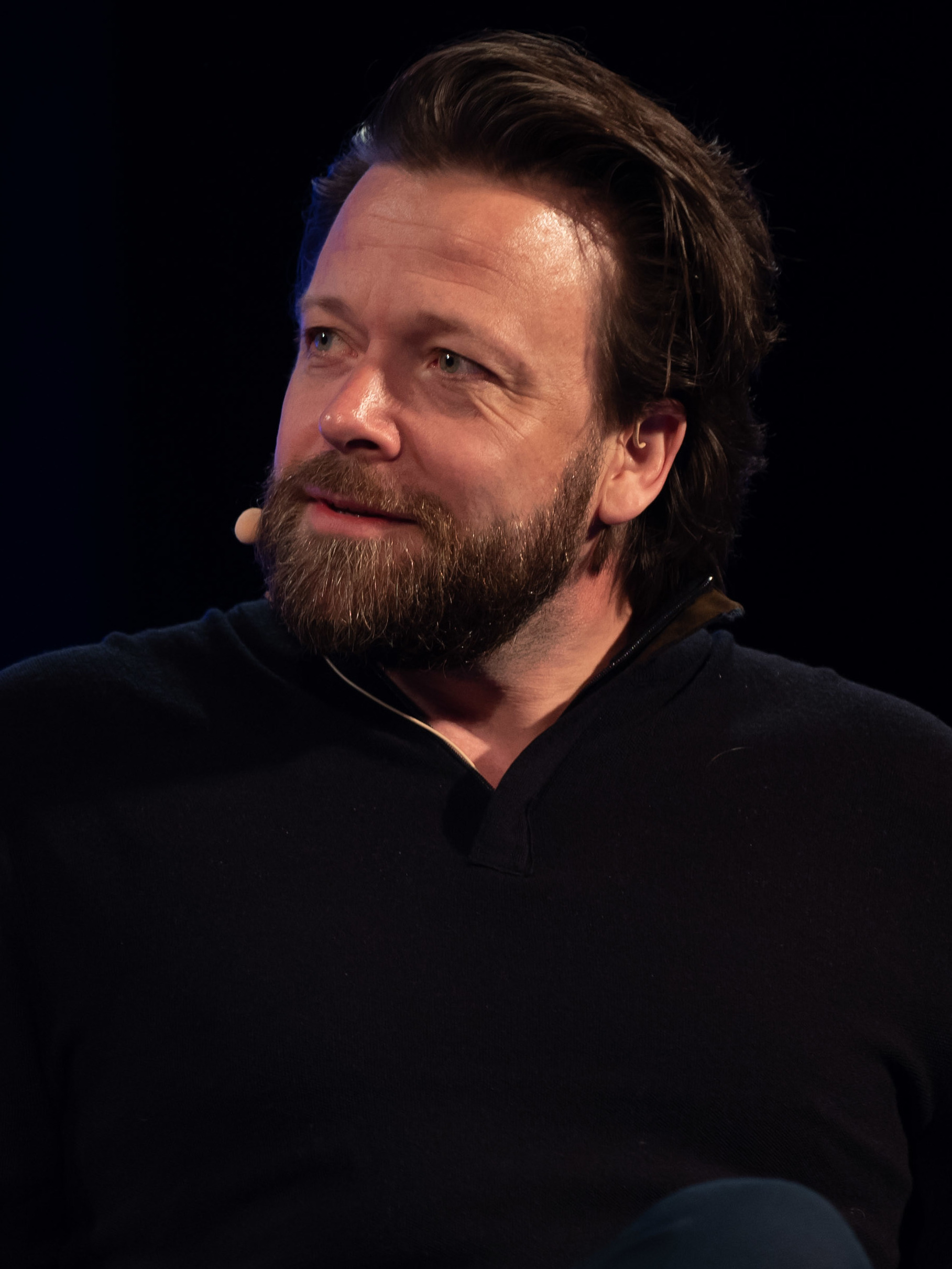
Kåre Conradi, 2018

- Axel Ender (1853 in Asker - 1920) a Norwegian genre painter and sculptor
- Hulda Garborg (1862–1934) playwright, poet and folk dancer; lived in Hvalstad from 1897
- Nini Roll Anker (1873–1942 in Asker) writer, lived in Lillehaugen
- Christian Hartmann (1910 in Asker – 1985) a Norwegian composer
- Alf Prøysen (1914–1970), singer, songwriter, and writer; lived in Semsvannet in his youth
- Grete Nordrå (1924 in Asker – 2012) a Norwegian screen actress
- Erik Bye (1926–2004), journalist, singer, TV personality; lived in Hvalstad
- Tom Tellefsen (1931 in Asker – 2012) a Norwegian actor
- Arild Nyquist (1938–2004), poet, painter, and singer/songwriter; grew up on Røa
- Wenche Myhre (born 1947 in Kjelsås) singer
- Espen Rud (born 1948 in Asker) a jazz drummer, composer, and music arranger
- Brit Elisabeth Haagensli (born 1953) an actress and singer, grew up in Asker
- Jan Knudsen (born 1957) crime writer, who grew up in Asker
- Morten Harket (born 1959) singer in a-ha, grew up in Asker
- Vigdis Hjorth (born 1959) author, lives in Asker
- Kåre Conradi (born 1972 in Asker) a Norwegian actor
- Svein Magnus Furu (born 1983 in Asker) jazz saxophonist, composer and music journalist
- Nina Fjalestad (born 1993 in Asker) a model, dancer, and Miss Globe International 2011
- Vilde Marie Zeiner (born 1999 in Asker) a Norwegian actress

=== Sport ===
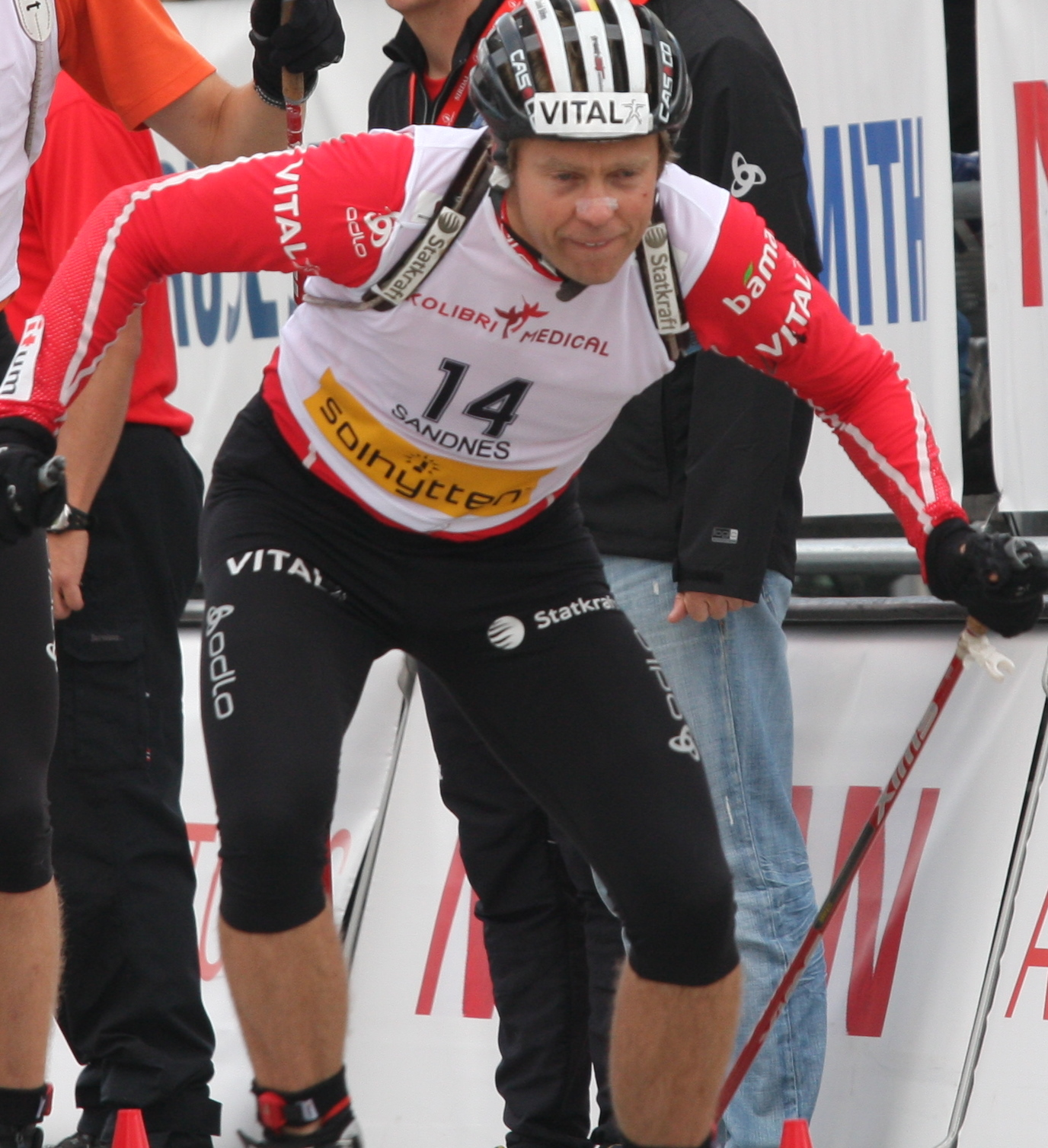
Halvard Hanevold, 2009

- Harald Østberg Amundsen & Hedda Østberg Amundsen (born 1998 in Asker) cross-country skiers
- Jan Frode Andersen (born 1972 in Asker) a Norwegian former tennis player
- Sander Berge (born 1998 in Asker) footballer
- Pål Arne Fagernes (1974 in Asker – 2003), Javelin thrower and boxer
- Tone Gunn Frustøl (born 1975 in Asker) former footballer, with 32 caps for Norway women and Olympic medalist.
- Halvard Hanevold (1969 in Asker – 2019) biathlete, multiple Olympic Gold medallist
- Tom Hilde (born 1987 in Asker) ski jumper, bronze medallist at the 2010 Winter Olympics
- Erik Follestad Johansen (born 1989 in Asker) former ice hockey player
- Bjørne Jorgensen, Olympic artistic gymnast
- Linda Medalen (born 1965) former footballer with 152 caps with Norway women, police officer and local councilor
- Harald Stenvaag (born 1953) rifle shooter, with two Olympic medals, runs a shop in Asker

== Twin towns ==
Asker is twinned with:

- Eslöv, Sweden
- Garðabær, Iceland
- Jakobstad, Finland
- Mapo (Seoul), South Korea
- Rudersdal, Denmark
