= Dagny Berger =

Pioneering Norway's first female aviator

Dagny Hansen Berger (1903–1950) was Norway's first woman aviator. She was granted her certificate by the Royal Aero Club of the United Kingdom in September 1927.

== Biography ==
Born on 16 September 1903 in Asker, Dagny Hansen was the daughter of the carpenter and later farmer Otto Hansen Berger (1864–1932) and Olava Petrine Eriksen (married 1899). Her name was changed from Hansen to Berger in 1910 when her parents bought the Berger Gård farm in Bærum. When she had finished her schooling, Berger was employed as a housemaid, a common practice at the time.

In 1923, Berger became one of the first Norwegian women to take her driving licence. She took part in car racing events in Finland. Her first car was a two-seater Willys Overland. A keen driver, she had difficulty in covering the costs of motoring as a maid. As a result, she began to sell books and watches before working in a fruit and cigar shop in Stabekk.

She became interested in flying after reading about female aviators in other countries. After being refused access to the military flying school at Kjeller in the spring of 1927, the following June she began training at the De Havilland flying school at Stag Lane Aerodrome near London where she learnt to fly the DH60 Moth. On 27 September she received her certificate, No. 8160, from the Royal Aero Club.

Back in Norway, she attempted to open her own business for sightseeing and passenger flights but there was little interest in passenger flights in Norway at the time. Instead, from 1929 she worked as a governess in Montreal, New York, Paris and Nice. She returned to Norway in 1933, working first in a restaurant before setting up a travel bureau. It closed in 1949.

Dagny Berger lost her life on 10 May 1950 when she was accidentally drowned in Bygdøy. She was only 46. A street in Bærum, Dagny Bergersvei, is named in her memory.
