= Maud (ship) =

Ship built for Roald Amundsen for his second expedition to the Arctic

Coordinates: 69°07′08″N 105°01′12″W

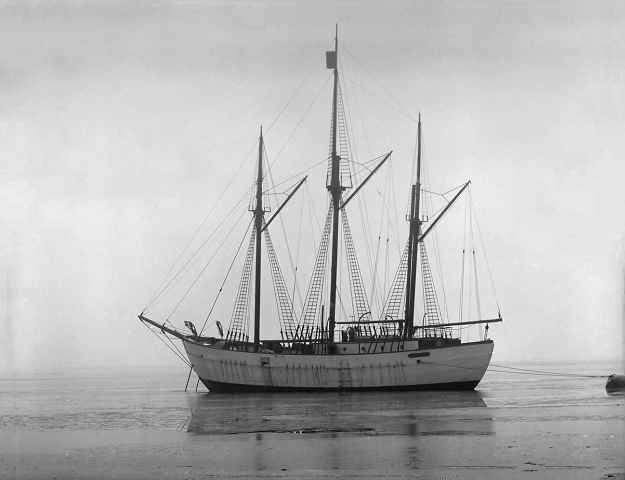
- Maud, 1918

History

Norway
- Name: Maud
- Namesake: Queen Maud of Norway
- Owner: Roald Amundsen
- Builder: Built in Asker, Norway
- Launched: June 1916 or 17 June 1917

Canada
- Owner: Hudson's Bay Company
- Acquired: 1925
- Renamed: Baymaud

Norway
- Owner: Asker, Norway
- Acquired: 1990
- Renamed: Maud

General characteristics
- Class & type: Oak hulled sailing ship, built for Arctic exploration
- Tonnage: 292 register
- Length: 36.5 m (119.75 ft)
- Beam: 12.3 m (40.35 ft)
- Depth of hold: 4.85 m (16 ft)
- Propulsion: 240 hp (177 kW) semidiesel Bolinder engine

Maud, named for Queen Maud of Norway, was a ship built for Roald Amundsen for his second expedition to the Arctic. Designed for his intended voyage through the Northeast Passage, the vessel was built in Asker, a suburb of the capital, Oslo.

After a difficult career as the Maud, she was sold in 1925 and rechristened the Baymaud. She sank in Cambridge Bay in 1930 and spent nearly eight decades laying as a hulk off the shore of the community. The vessel was refloated in 2016 and in 2018 was returned to Norway, where preservation of the historic craft was begun.

== Career ==
Maud was launched in June 1916 or 17 June 1917 at Vollen and ceremonially christened by Amundsen crushing a chunk of ice against her bow:

It is not my intention to dishonor the glorious grape, but already now you shall get the taste of your real environment. For the ice you have been built, and in the ice you shall stay most of your life, and in the ice you shall solve your tasks. With the permission of our Queen, I christen you Maud

— Roald Amundsen

She lived up to her christening, as she remained in the ice until 2016. Whereas other vessels used in Amundsen's polar explorations, Gjøa and Fram, have been preserved at the Norwegian Maritime Museum, Maud had a more rugged fate. After sailing through the Northeast Passage, which did not go as planned and took six years between 1918 and 1924, she ended up in Nome, Alaska and in August 1925 was sold on behalf of Amundsen's creditors in Seattle, Washington.

The buyer was the Hudson's Bay Company, which renamed her Baymaud. She was to be used as a supply vessel for Company outposts in Canada's western Arctic. Prior to her final voyage Baymaud was given a refit in Vancouver, British Columbia. (The work was supervised by Tom Halliday, who later designed the RCMP vessel St. Roch, based on Maud.) In the winter of 1926 she was frozen into the ice at Cambridge Bay, where she sank in 1930. The wreck lay just offshore, across the inlet from the community's former Hudson's Bay Company store. Nearby is the site of the former Cambridge Bay LORAN Tower, built in 1947.

== Salvage ==
In 1990 the ship was sold by the Hudson's Bay Company to Asker with the expectation that she would be returned to the town. Although a Cultural Properties Export permit was issued, the price tag to repair and move the ship was 230 million kroner ($43,200,000) and the permit expired.

In 2011 an Asker-based company, Tandberg Eiendom AS, in the project Maud Returns Home announced a plan to return Maud to Norway. They intend to build a museum in Vollen to house her, near where she was built and had purchased a barge to move her. Concern about the plan came from the community of Cambridge Bay, Parks Canada, the Government of Nunavut, the International Polar Heritage Committee, and some people in her intended destination. Initial refusal of a new export permit from the federal government, on the grounds of a lack of a full archeological study was later reversed on appeal in March 2012. The salvage operation was under way in the summer of 2015, with a plan to return the hull to Norway in the summer of 2016.

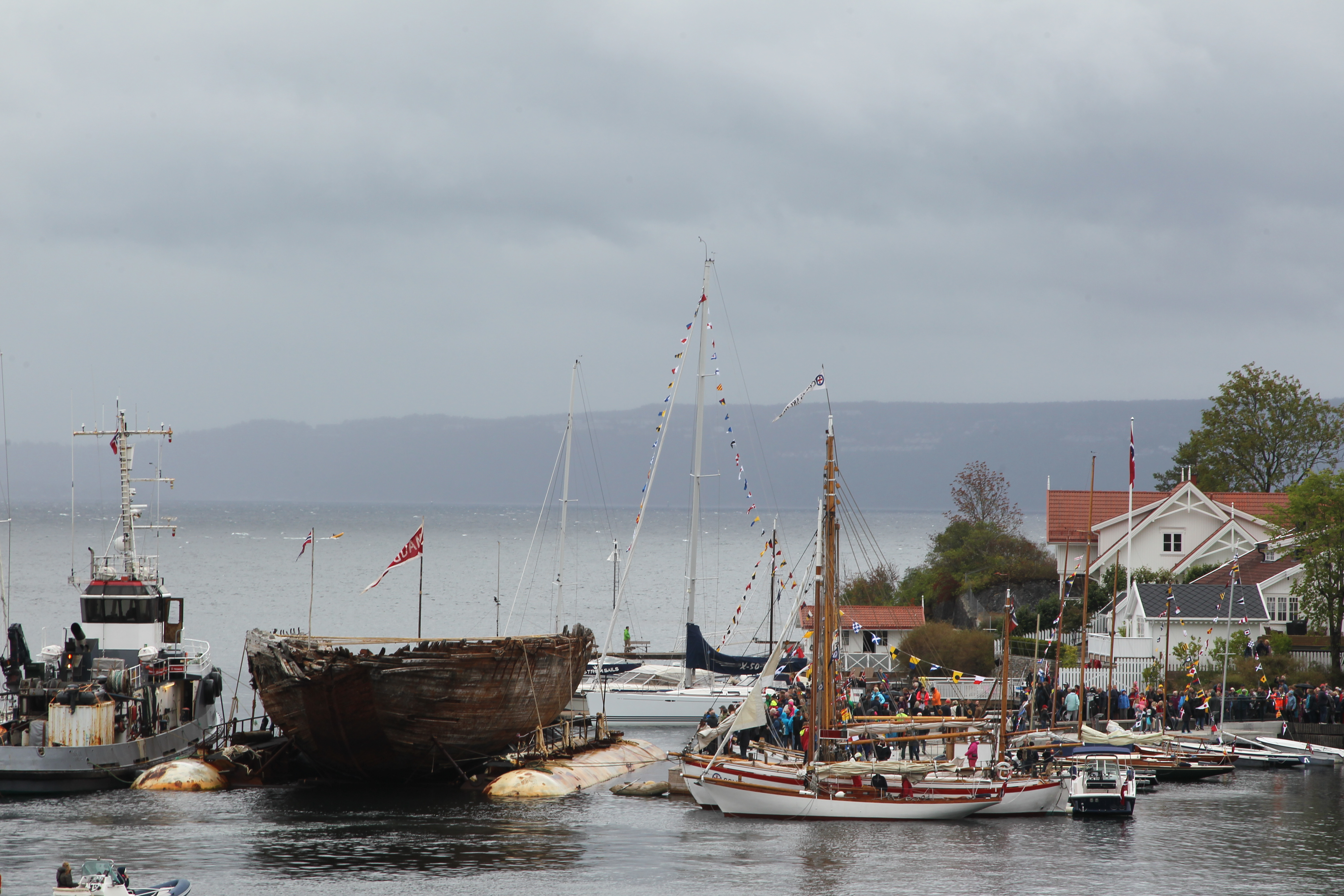
Maud at Vollen in Norway on 18 August 2018

On 31 July 2016 it was reported that the hull of Maud had been raised to the surface and placed on a barge in preparation for shipment to Norway. In August 2017 Maud began the journey back to Norway; she was towed through the Northwest Passage. In September 2017 she arrived in Greenland to stay for the winter. Maud arrived in Bergen on 6 August 2018, finally returning to Norway nearly a century after her departure with Amundsen. She was then towed along the Norwegian coast, and arrived at Vollen on 18 August.

== Gallery ==
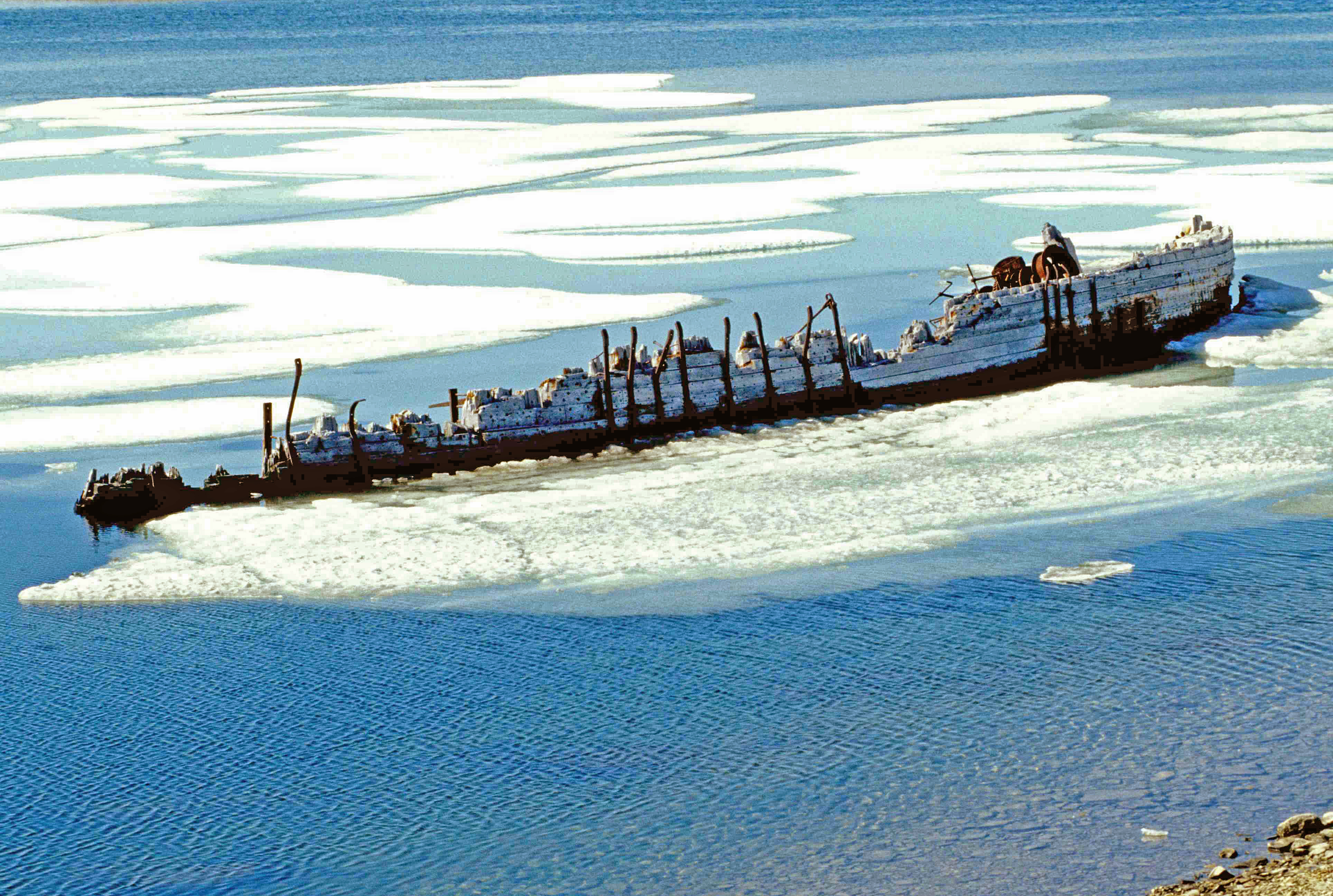
The wreck of Maud near Cambridge Bay, on the south coast of Victoria Island in Nunavut, Canada in 1998.

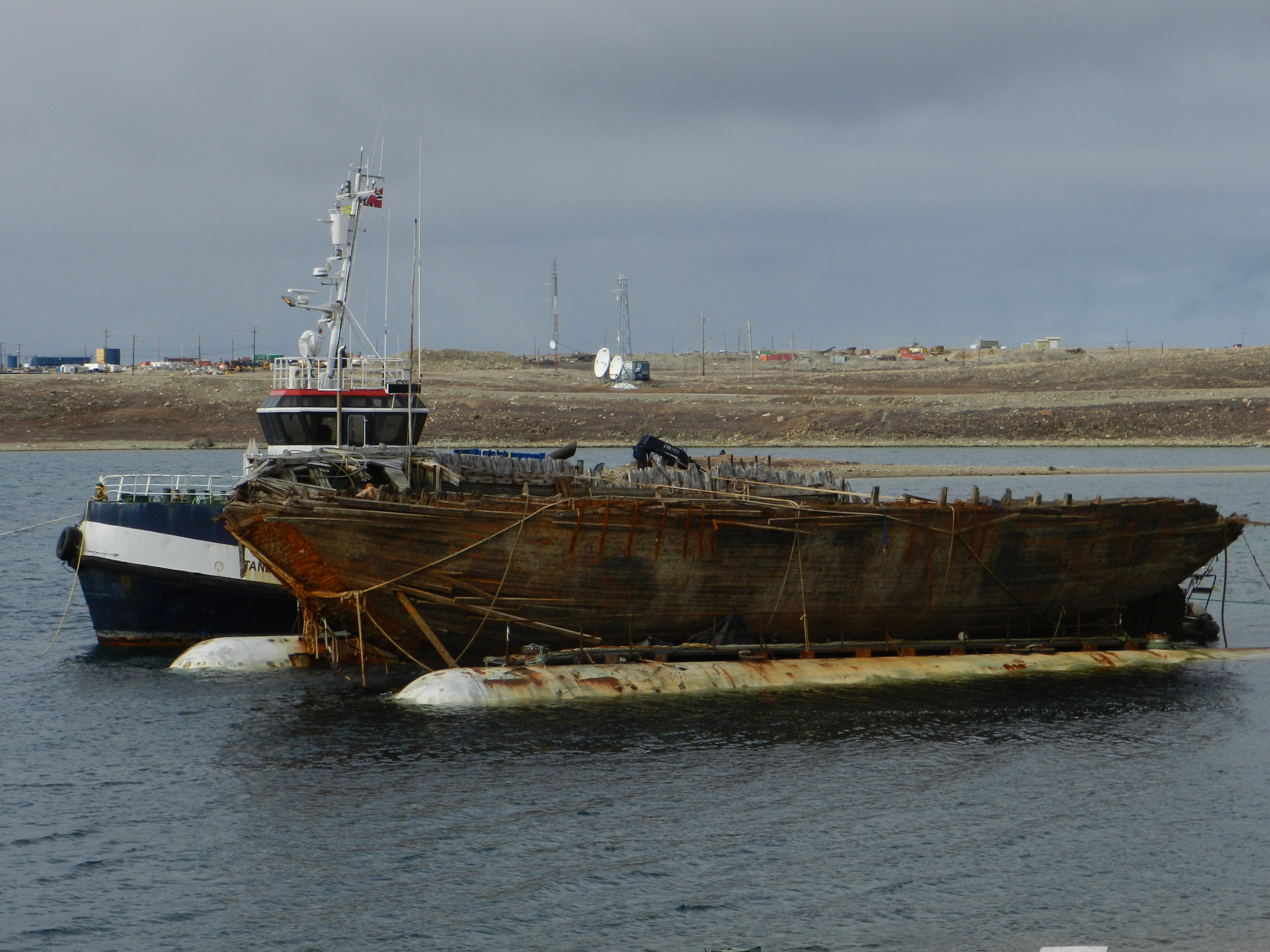
Maud on the surface in 2016.

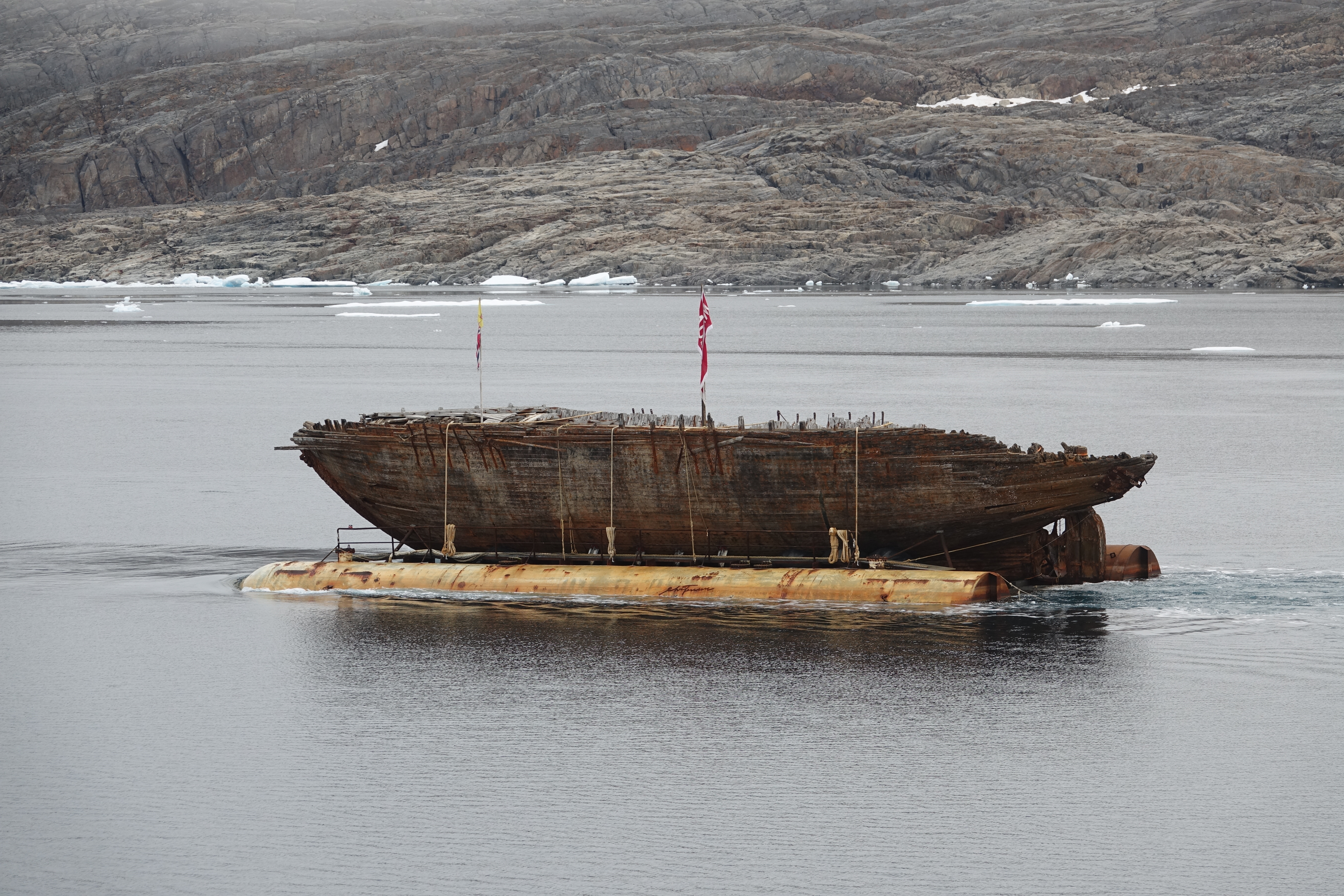
Maud being towed through the Bellot Strait towards Greenland in early September 2017.

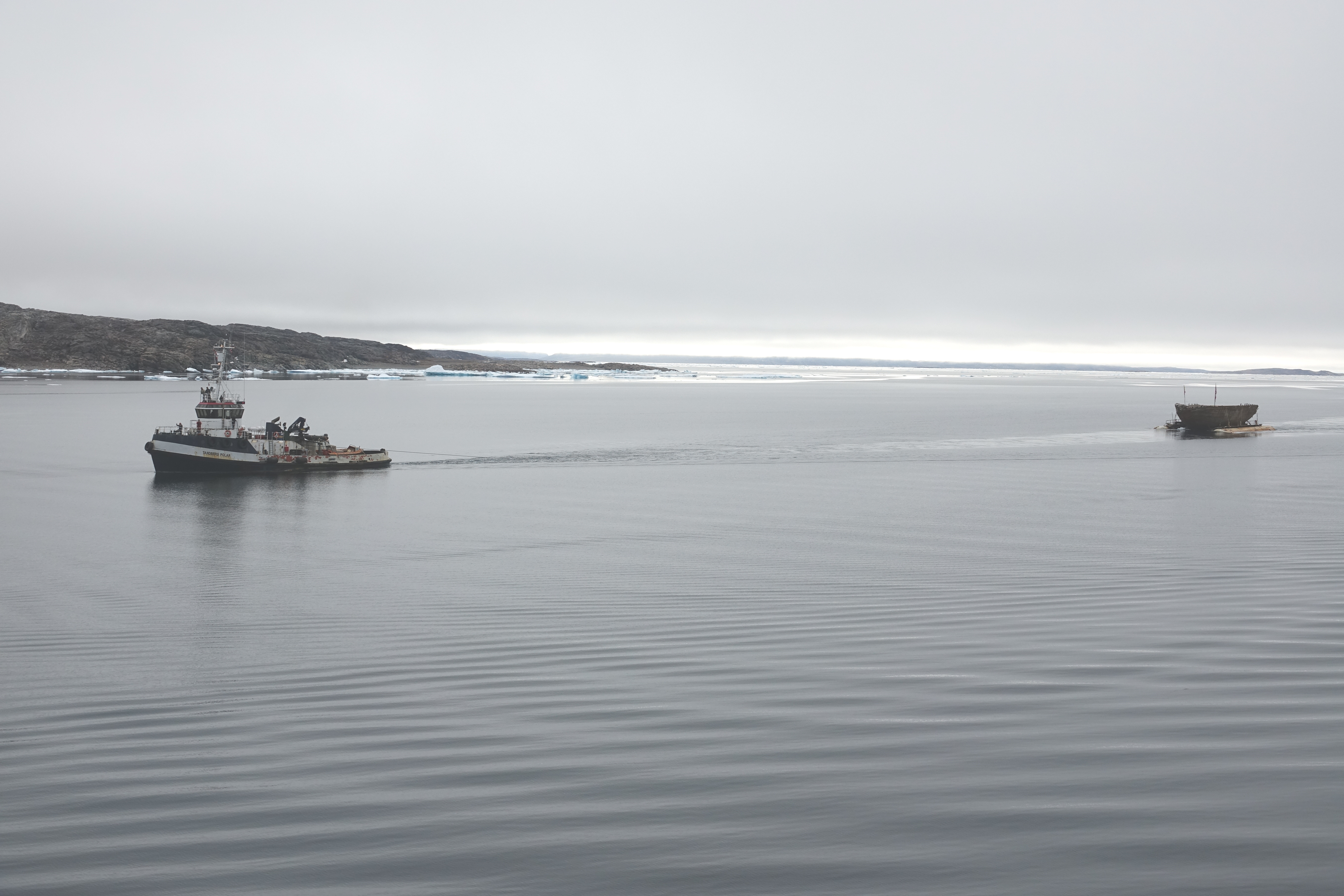
Tandberg Polar towing Maud through the Bellot Strait towards Greenland in early September 2017.

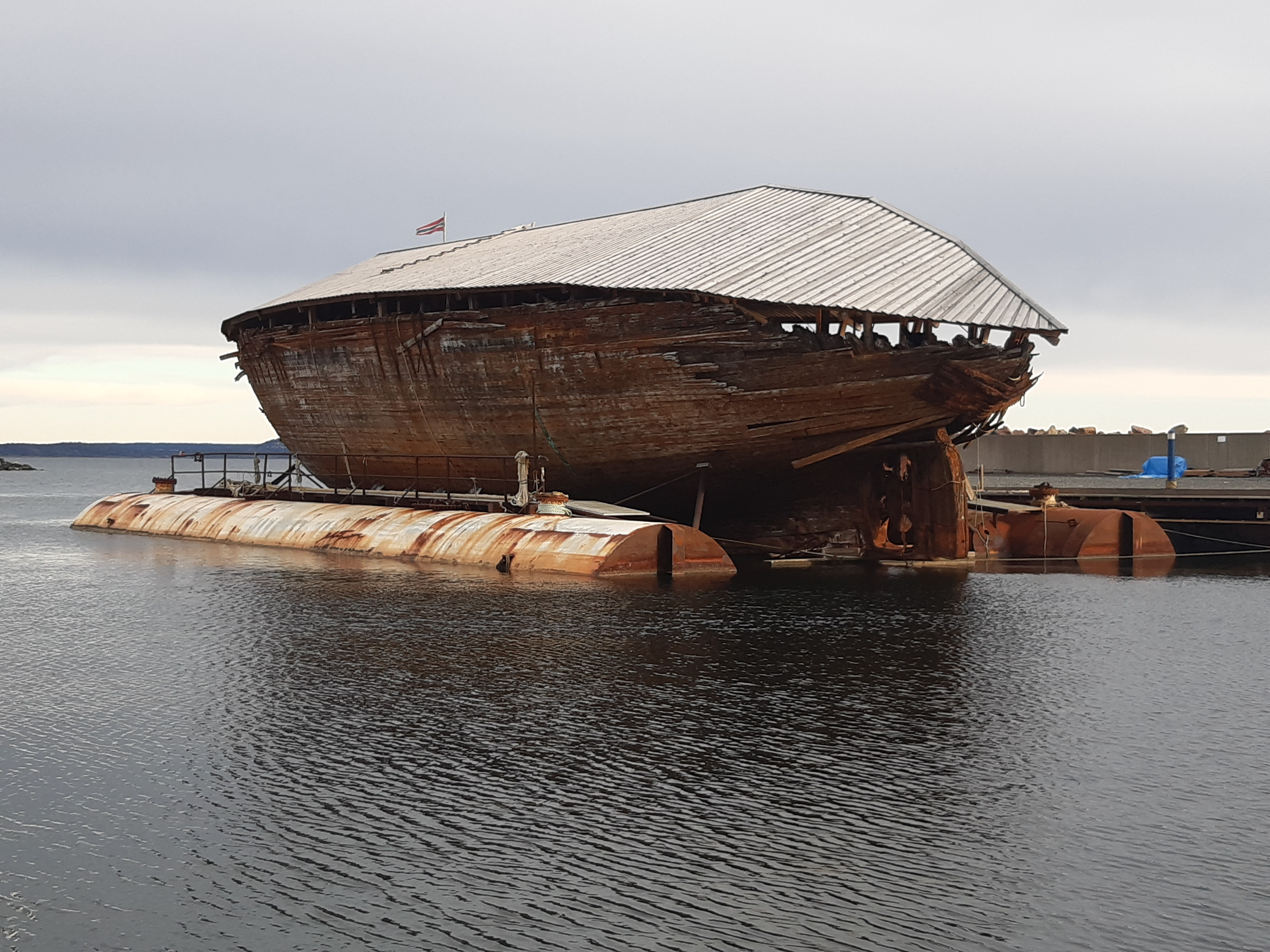
Maud with protective roof at Tofte, Norway in March 2020, while awaiting a new museum building for her.

Pennant flown from the mast of the ship during her original tenure. It was also later flown from the hull of the wreck during the barge journey back to Norway.
