= Semsvannet =

Lake in Asker, Norway

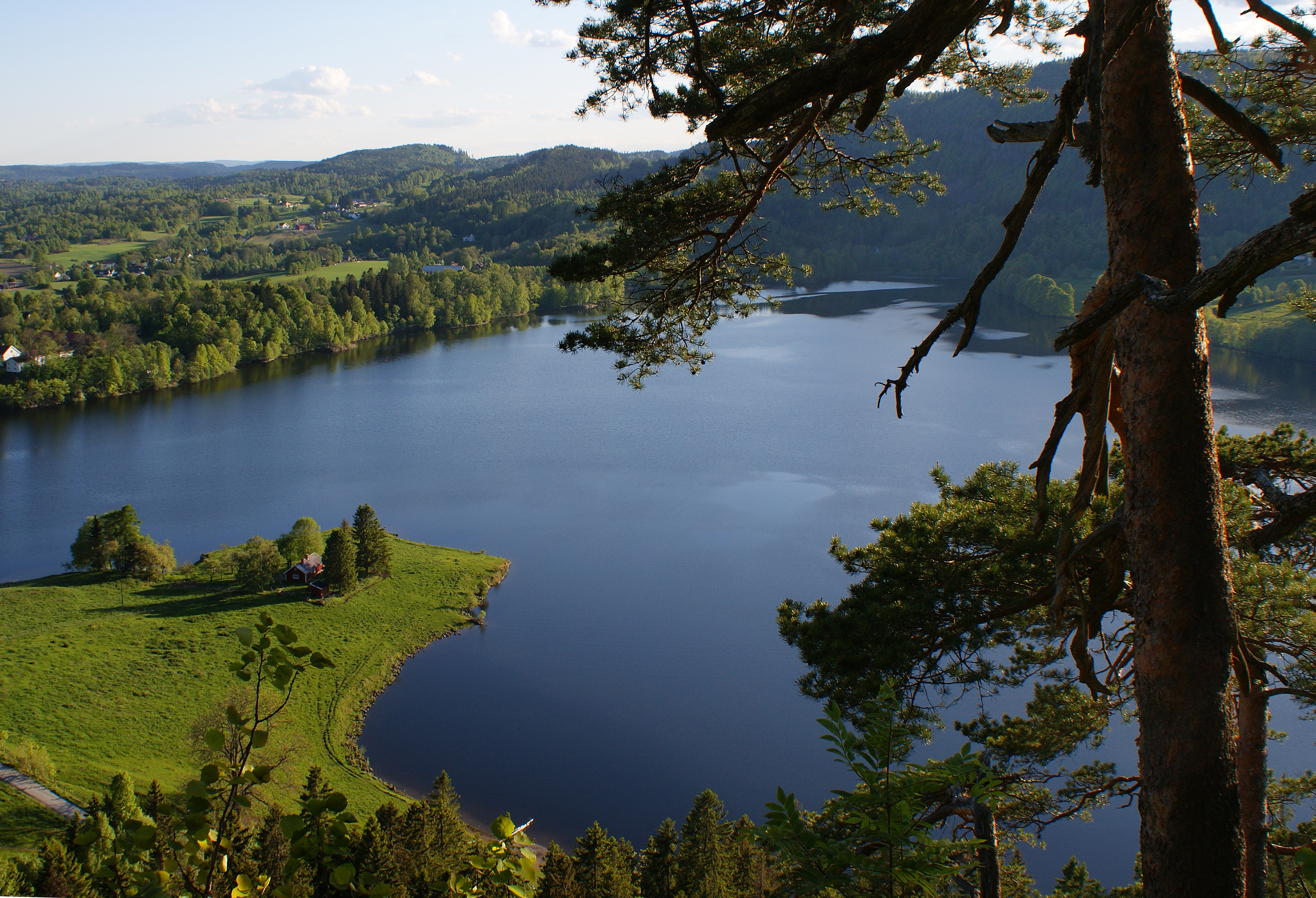
- From the mountain ridge Skaugumsåsen – over Tangen and Semsvannet

- Location within Norway
- Location: Asker, Akershus, Norway
- Coordinates: 59°51′31″N 10°25′20″E
- Type: lake
- Primary inflows: Gupelva
- Primary outflows: Askerelva
- Surface area: 0.75 km^{2} (190 acres)
- Surface elevation: 145 meters (476 feet)

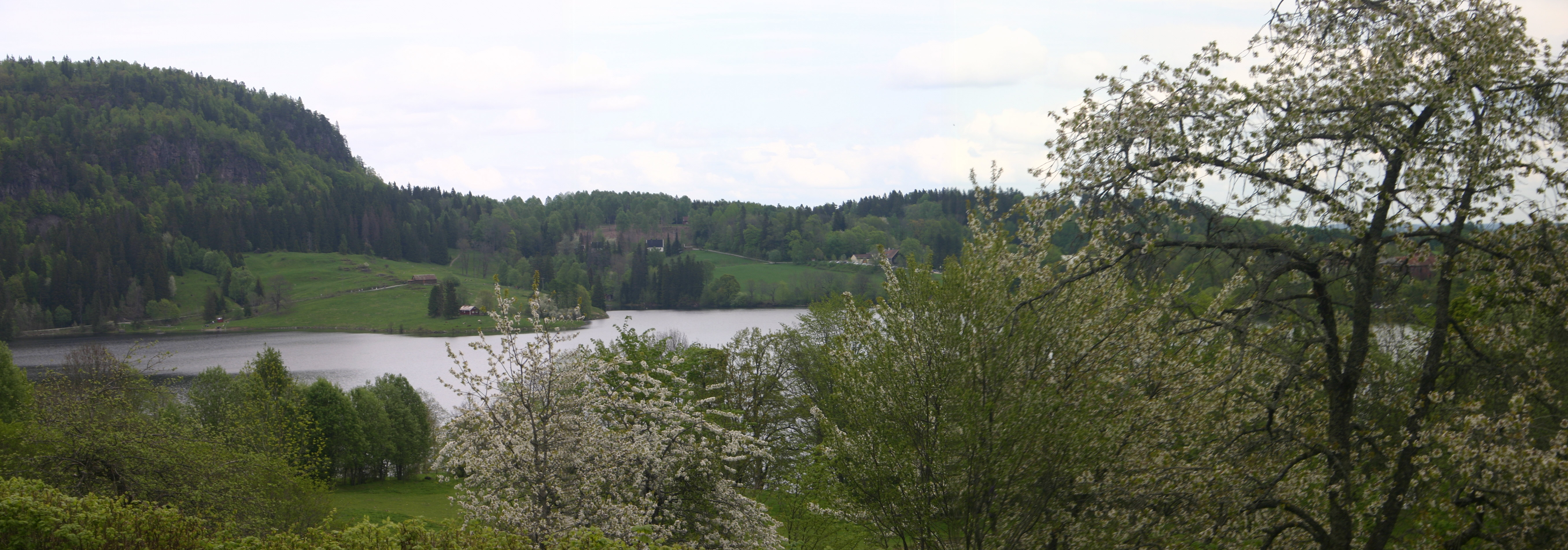
View of Semsvannet, Skaugumsåsen and Tangen

Semsvannet is a lake in Asker municipality in Akershus county, southwest of Oslo, in Norway. The lake is situated close to, for the Norwegians, famous places such as the ridge Skaugumsåsen, the old cultural house Tangen and Skaugum the official residence of the heir to the throne of Norway, i.e. the crown prince or princess of Norway. The status of Semsvannet as a nature reserve was upgraded when the area was protected as a conservation area October 2, 1992. The lake and its vicinity was elected a millennium site in the year 2000.

== Numbers ==
Lake Semsvannet is 0.75 km^{2} (190 acres) and is situated at a height of 145 meters (476 feet) above sea level. The greatest depth is 34 metres (112 ft). To the lake flows the river Gupelva. From the lake flows the river Askerelva. Regarding the inhabitants of the lake, fish, there are: Northern pike (Esox lucius), European perch (Perca fluviatilis) and Roach (Rutilus rutilus). There are also smaller populations of Brown trout (Salmo trutta), Arctic char (Salvelinus aplinus) and European whitefish (Coregonus lavaretus).

== Sports and Outdoor Pursuits ==
For generations, Semsvannet has been utilized as a lake for swimming, especially among the, at the time, permanent residents at Tangen, et cetera. It is possible to perform cross-country running around the lake or – according to the Norwegian expression – "gå på tur" [eng. do a walkabout, to trek]. The distance is then 4.8 km (3.0 mi). For outdoor and athletic people there are summer trails and winter ski trails, into the Vestmarka, that begins here.

== Landscape of Nature, Agriculture and Culture ==
=== Countryside of Nature and Agriculture ===
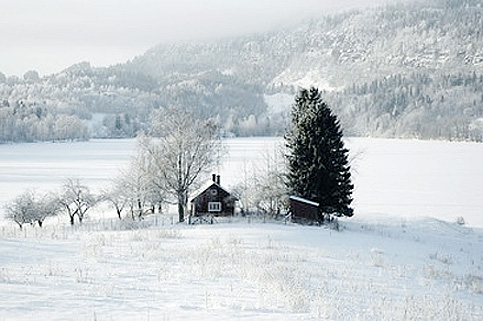
Winter over Tangen and Semsvannet

Semsvannet and vicinity belongs to the Norwegian natural, agricultural and cultural history. The estates Sem, Store Berg and Tveiter are to be found nearby the lake. However, situated even closer to the lake, by far – at the foot of the ridge Skaugumsåsen – is the cultural house Tangen, which during the first half of the twentieth century was the domicile of the Family Kaspersen; who among others frequently was visited by the Norwegian cultural personality and friend Alf Prøysen at social gatherings and feasts arranged by the family.

=== Culture and Songs Dedicated to The Area ===
To have the songwriter, troubadour and friend Alf Prøysen nearby, made a mutual impact, and inspired the just a few years younger son of Tangen, Karsten Kaspersen. Who in his turn wrote several songs dedicated to the area, and how it was to live and grow up close to the lake Semsvannet and at Tangen in the first half of the twentieth century (i.e. around the years 1900 to 1950). From Karsten Kaspersen’s musical production, the following songs dedicated to the area around Semsvannet can be noted:

- “Skaugumsåsen” (eng. The Mountain Ridge of Skaugumsåsen)
- “I ungdomsår” (In Our Youth)
- “Skymning over Tangen” (Nightfall over Tangen)

== Place of The Millennium ==
The old house of Tangen was culturally protected in 1992, and it and the Semsvannet area are much-loved destinations in nature for the Norwegians. In 1998, the Millennium Committee of Asker arranged the Millennium Election for its community residents, regarding the most favoured place in nature. Among the many nominations, Semsvannet and its surrounding area was chosen as the finest and most beautiful.
