= Norwegian Wholesale Paper Merchants Association =

The Norwegian Wholesale Paper Merchants Association (Norwegian: Papirgrossistenes Landsforening, PGL) is an employers' organisation in Norway.

It is a member of the Federation of Norwegian Commercial and Service Enterprises as well as EUGROPA, the European Paper Merchants Association. Chairman of the board is Per Claudi.
