= Development Today =

Development Today is an independent online journal on Nordic and multilateral aid, originally started as a print magazine in 1991. Founded by a group of Nordic journalists, Development Today has a policy of not accepting funding from donors, NGOs or other aid actors. Its readership is mainly development professionals.

It claims to be the only specialised aid publication with this strict editorial line and is financed mainly through subscriptions.
