= Opplysningsrådet for Veitrafikken =

Norwegian road transport organisation

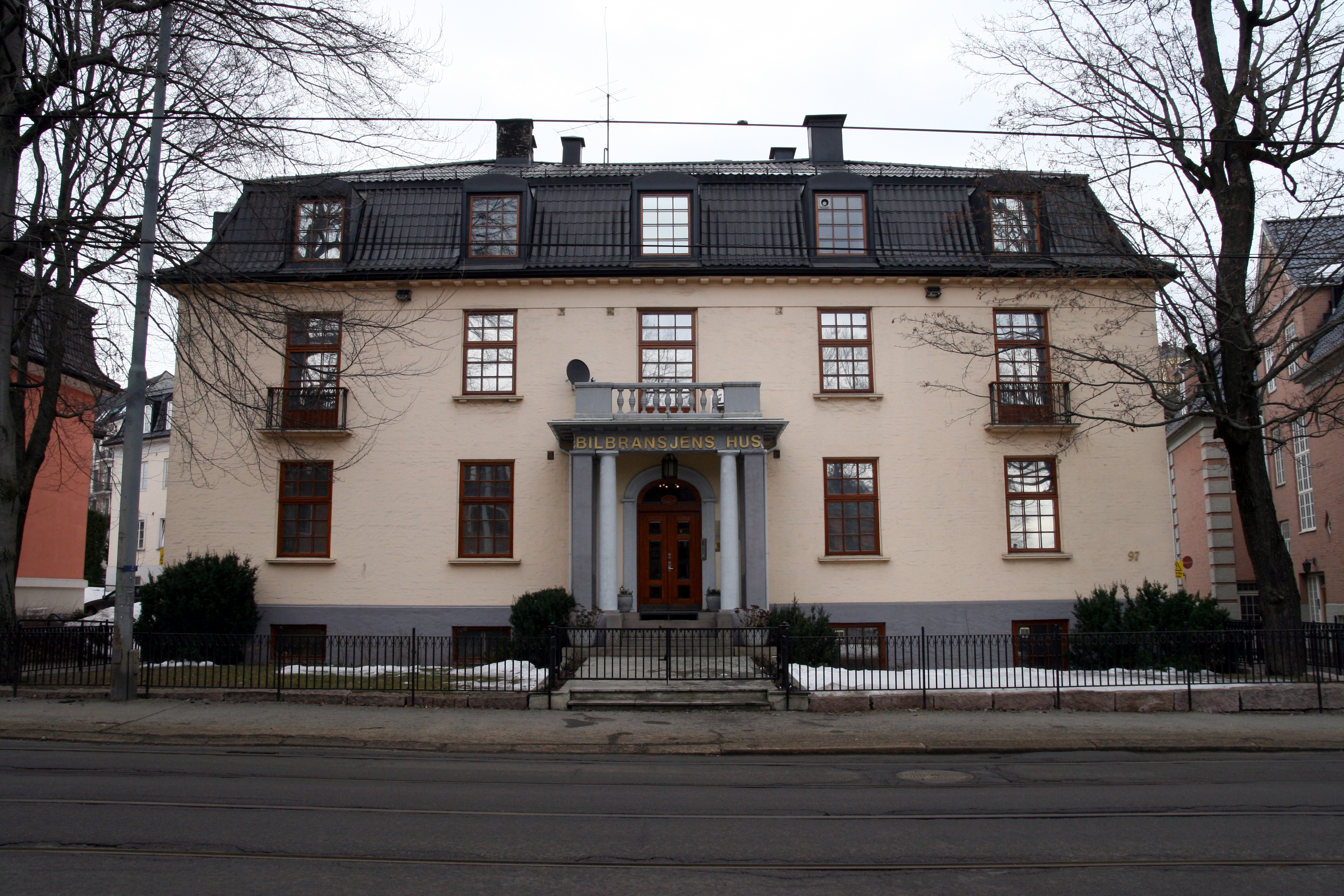
- Headquarters in Frogner borough, Oslo
- Type: Voluntary association
- Location: Oslo, Norway

Opplysningsrådet for Veitrafikken (OFV, 'Norwegian Road Federation') is a Norwegian transportation interest group, established in 1948. The organization is a member of the International Road Federation.
