= Hvalstad =

Village in Asker Municipality, Norway

Coordinates: 59°51′32″N 10°27′43″E

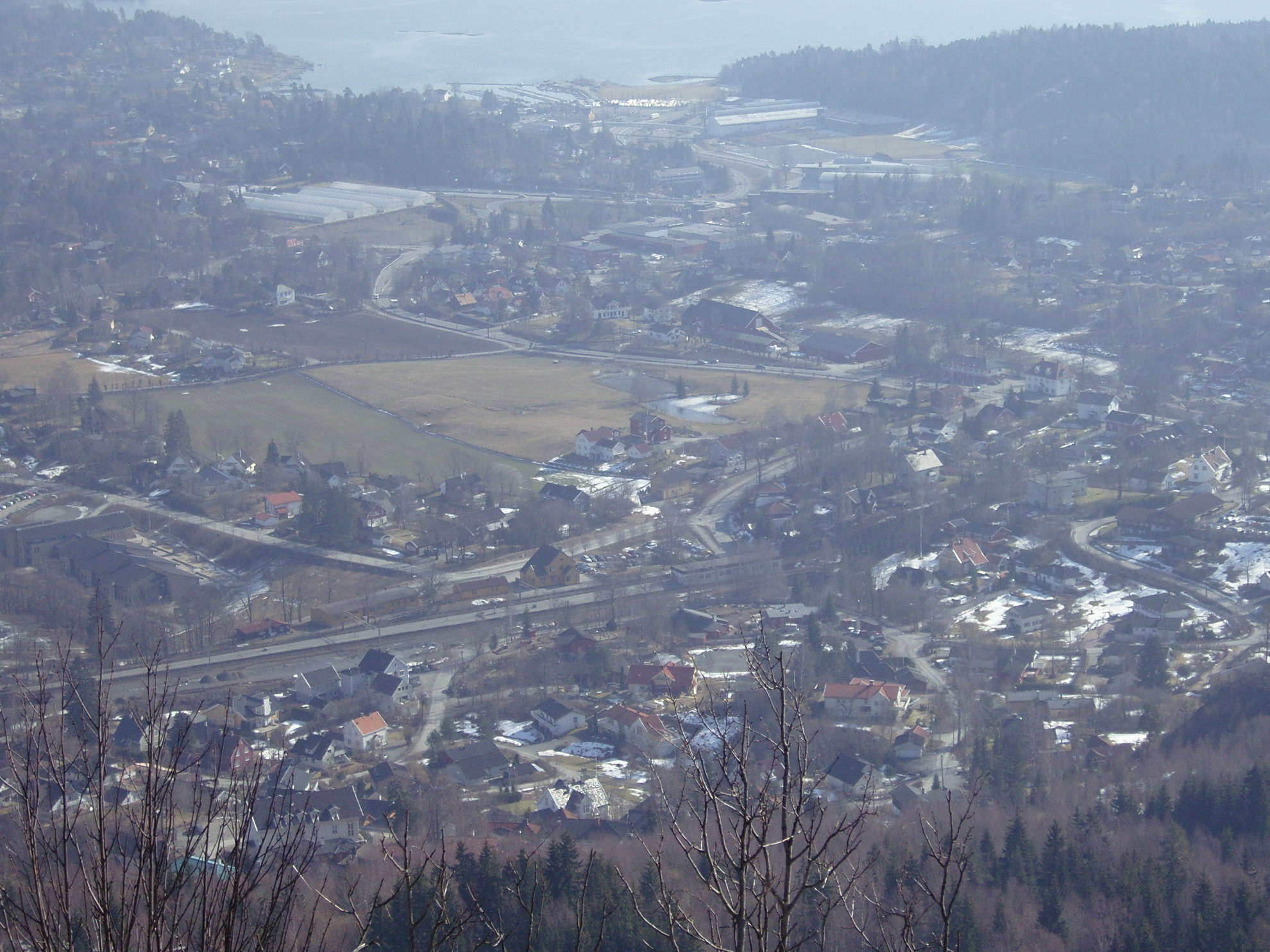
Hvalstad seen from Skaugumsåsen

Hvalstad is a village and a small part of the municipality of Asker. Hvalstad has slightly over 2,000 inhabitants, a number that has doubled since the 1970s. Hvalstad lies 20 kilometres from the centre of Oslo.

Hvalstad Station is on the Drammen Line, which opened on October 7, 1872.

== Asker Museum ==
Asker Museum is located in Hvalstad. The museum primarily shows the audience art of many kinds. It's a source to knowledge, understanding and inspiration. This Museum was the home of Otto and Tilla Valstad. They are related to the family that Hvalstad got its name from. When they died in the forties they gave their properties including their house to the Municipality of Asker and in this way it became a museum.

== Hvalstad school ==
The school in Hvalstad is relatively new; its construction was finished in 1999. Hvalstad School has a basket court and a grass football pitch. The school was reopened in March 2026 after several years of renovation.

== Notable residents ==
Notable people that were born or lived in Hvalstad include:

- Johan Bojer (1872–1959), Norwegian novelist and dramatist
- Olav Eysteinson Fjærli (1883–1947), politician
