= Skaugumsåsen =

Mountain in Norway

Coordinates: 59.8611°N 10.4433°E

Geography
- Location: Akershus, Norway

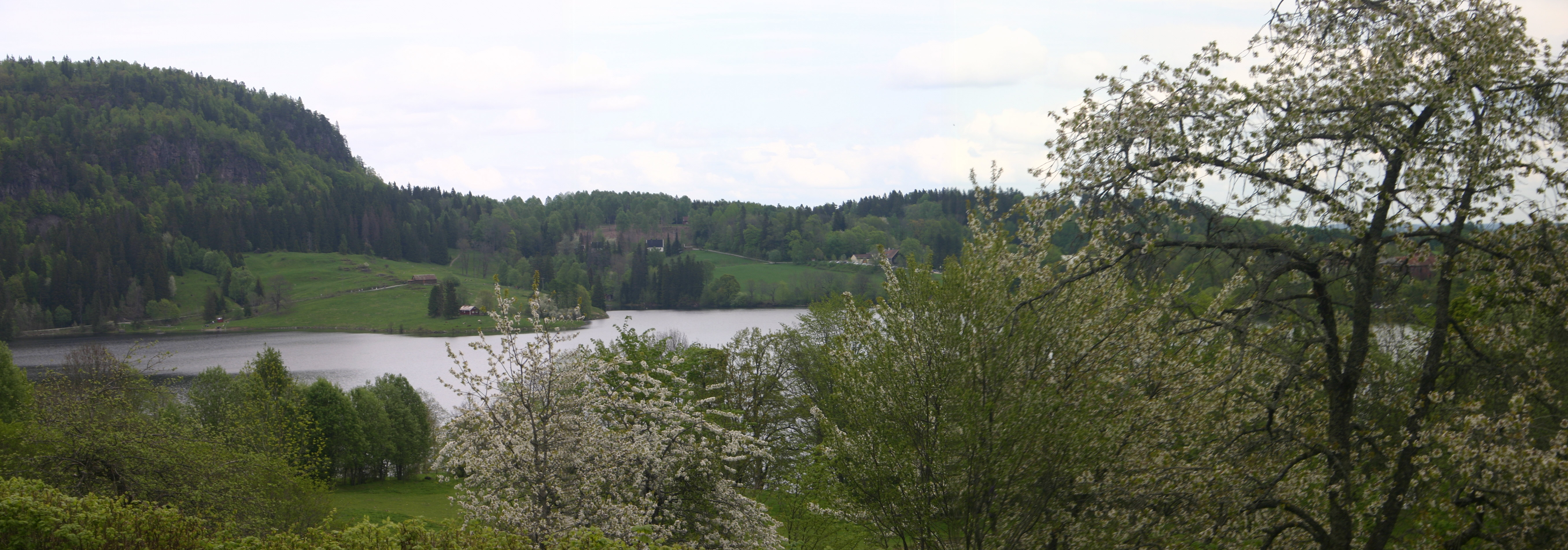
View of Skaugumsåsen, over Semsvannet and Tangen

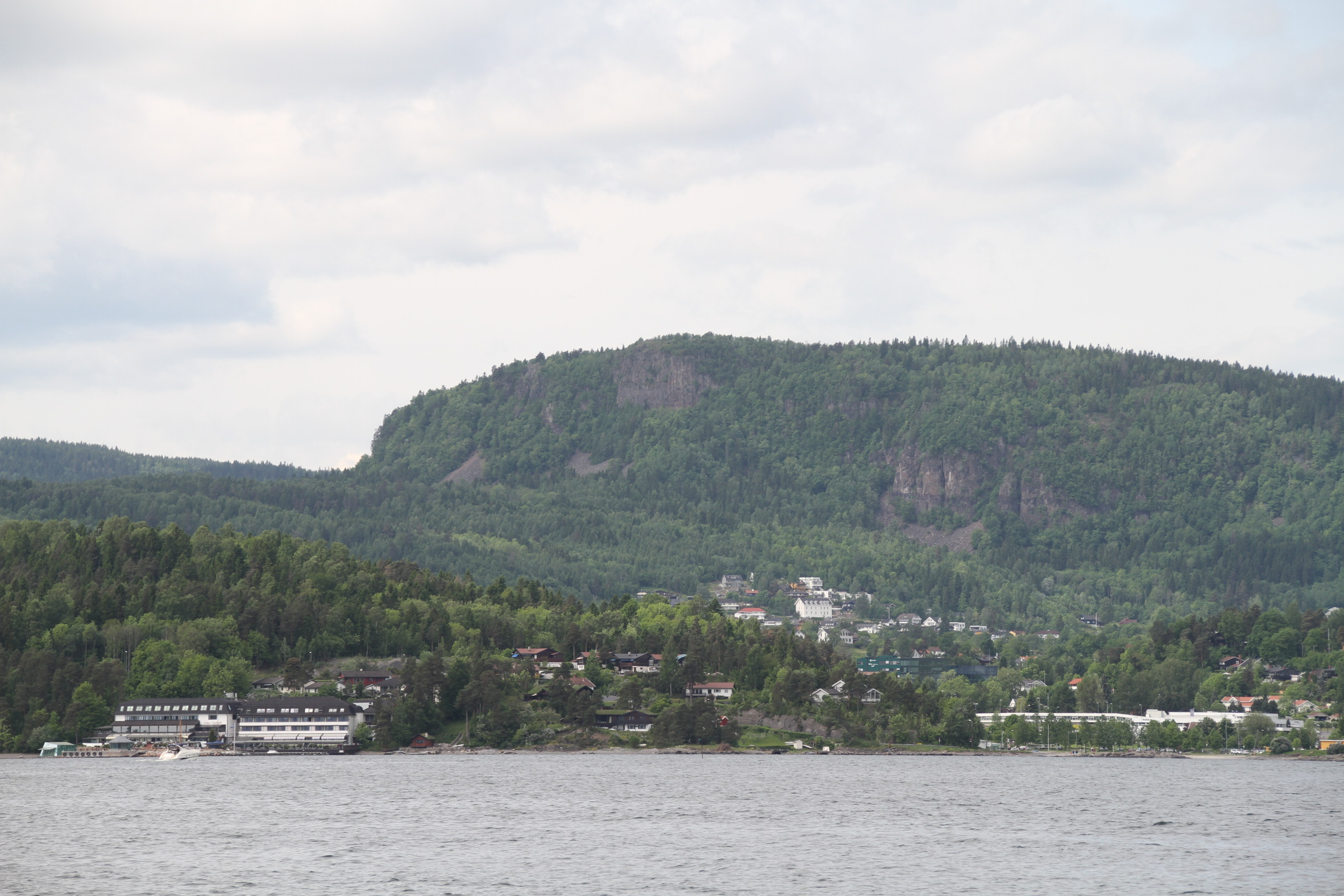
Skaugumsåsen seen from the Oslofjord.

Skaugumsåsen is a mountain in Asker in the county of Akershus, in southeastern Norway.

== See also ==
- Semsvannet and Vicinity - Elected the Place of the Millennium in Norway
