= Vollen, Asker =

Vollen, Akershus
- Village
- Location in Akershus Vollen, Akershus (Norway)
- Coordinates: 59°48′27″N 10°29′07″E
- Country: Norway
- Region: Østlandet
- County: Akershus
- Time zone: UTC+01:00 (CET)
  - Summer (DST): UTC+02:00 (CEST)

Vollen is a part of the Asker municipality in Akershus county, Norway. For statistical purposes, it is usually treated as part of the Oslo urban area. It is mainly a residential area, though the area has a café, a restaurant, several art galleries, a primary school and secondary school.

== Location ==
Vollen is situated about 10 km (6.2 mi) south of the main settlement of Asker. Vollen lies next to the western coast of the Oslofjord. Vollen itself lies around 100 m (330 ft) above sea level at the top, and next to the sea at the bottom. Slemmestadveien goes directly through Vollen centre.

The Vollen postal code is 1390 and 1391.

== Politics ==
Although the municipality of Asker is traditionally a conservative stronghold, with Høyre (Conservative Party) having a strong position in the local government, Arbeiderpartiet (Labour Party) got the most votes in both the 2005 and the 2001 elections. Fremskrittspartiet (Progress Party) was the second largest party in 2005, recording 22.6% of the votes, while Høyre got 19.2%. No other parties had anywhere above 8% in the recent election, though the Sosialistisk Venstreparti (Socialist Left Party) was the fourth-largest party in 2001 with 14.1%. Their decline in 2005 reflected a nationwide trend. Both in 2001 and 2005, the result of the nation and the results in Vollen were quite similar, although the Conservatives were stronger in Vollen and the Kristelig Folkeparti (Christian Democratic Party) and the Senterpartiet (Centre Party) were weaker.

== Infrastructure ==
The most famous place in Vollen is perhaps the local bakery "Café Oscar", run by the local people. Vollen has also Mats and Martin (restaurant), Galleri Pink (art gallery), Hebbe Lilles (art gallery), Søstrene Sagen (interior shop), Herligheten (gift shop) and Kroa (a large dock and dining place). There is no local library (the nearest is in Slemmestad, Heggedal or Asker).

The local school, Arnestad barneskole, was built in 1992, and expanded several times. As of June 2006, it had 500 pupils aged from 6 to 13 (first to seventh grade), and does not split the pupils into classes which they keep for the whole seven-year period in the school; instead, they are in working groups which may change from year to year or even more frequently. Arnestad school has almost 80 employees.

The local secondary school, Vollen Ungdomskole, was built in 2001. As of June 2006, it had 379 pupils aged from 13 to 16 (eight to tenth grade), and does not split the pupils into classes which they keep for the whole three-year period in the school; instead, they are in working groups which may change from year to year or even more frequently.

== Transport ==
A boat service (Hurtigbåten, or "speed boat") operates from the western coast of Oslo to the east coast of the Oslofjord. There are also bus services to the centre of Vollen.

== Sports ==
Vollen Ungdomslag (VUL), the local sports club, was founded in 1914. It currently has a football division with junior teams up to the age of 19. The men's football currently plays on the fifth highest level of the Norwegian league system.

Vollen is also host to a lot of sailing, especially during the summer.

== The Maud ==
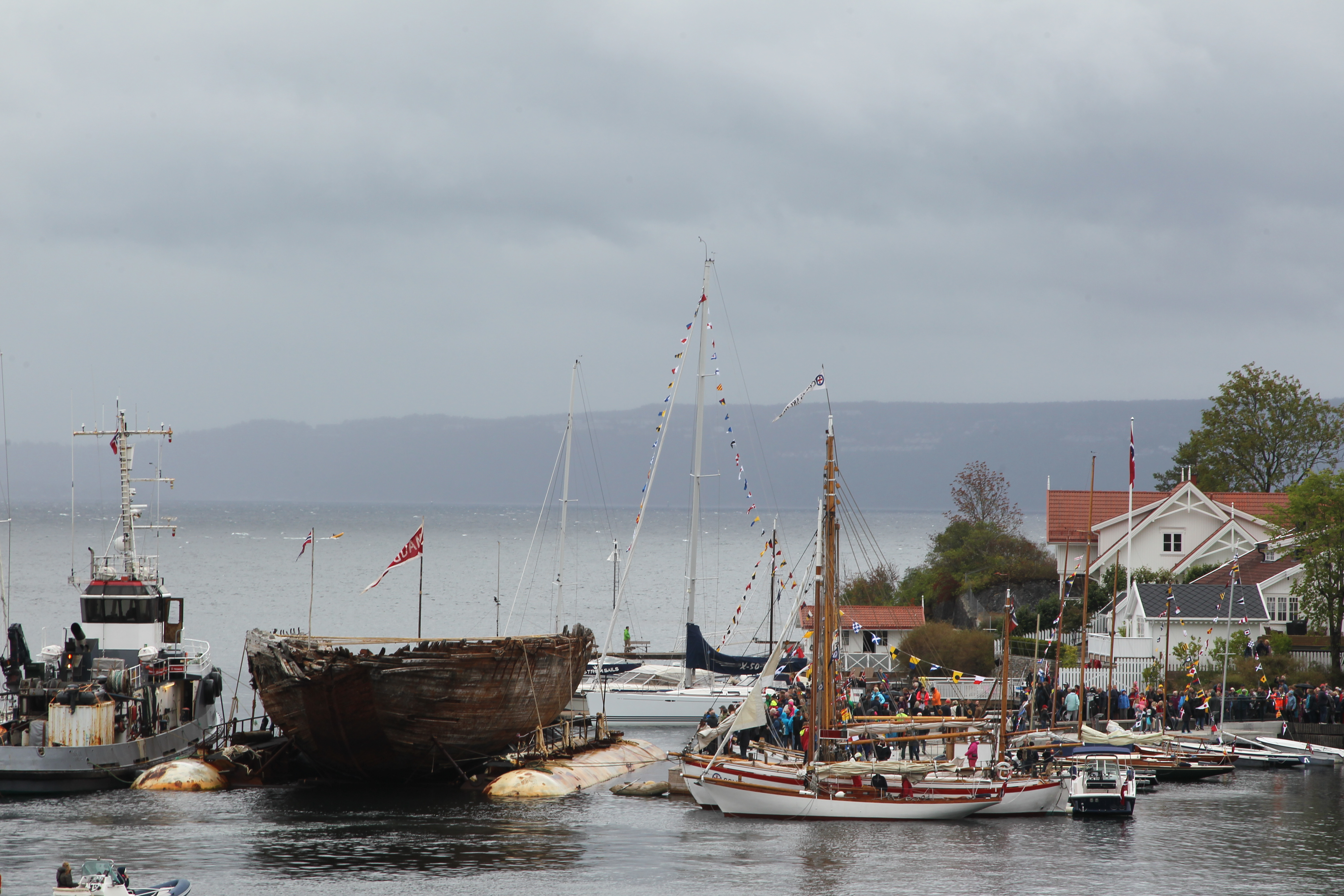
Maud at Vollen on 18 August 2018

In 1916 (or 1917) the Arctic expedition ship Maud was built here and launched into Oslofjord. The ship was designed and built especially for Roald Amundsen and sailed through the Northeast Passage between 1918 and 1924. Sold to the Hudson's Bay Company as the supply vessel Baymaud she sank at Cambridge Bay, Northwest Territories (now Nunavut), Canada in 1930. In 1990, the ship was sold by the Hudson's Bay Company to Asker town with the expectation that she would be returned there; however the export permit expired due to the 230 million kroner ($43,200,000) cost to repair and move the ship. In 2011 a new project was commenced to salvage Maud and transport her to a new museum to be built at Vollen.

On 31 July 2016 it was reported that the hull of Maud had been raised to the surface and placed on a barge in preparation for shipment to Norway. In August 2017 Maud began the journey back to Norway; she was towed through the Northwest Passage. In September 2017 she arrived in Greenland to stay for the winter. Maud arrived in Bergen on 6 August 2018, finally returning to Norway nearly a century after her departure with Amundsen. She was then towed along the Norwegian coast, and arrived at Vollen on 18 August.
