= Enterprise Federation of Norway =

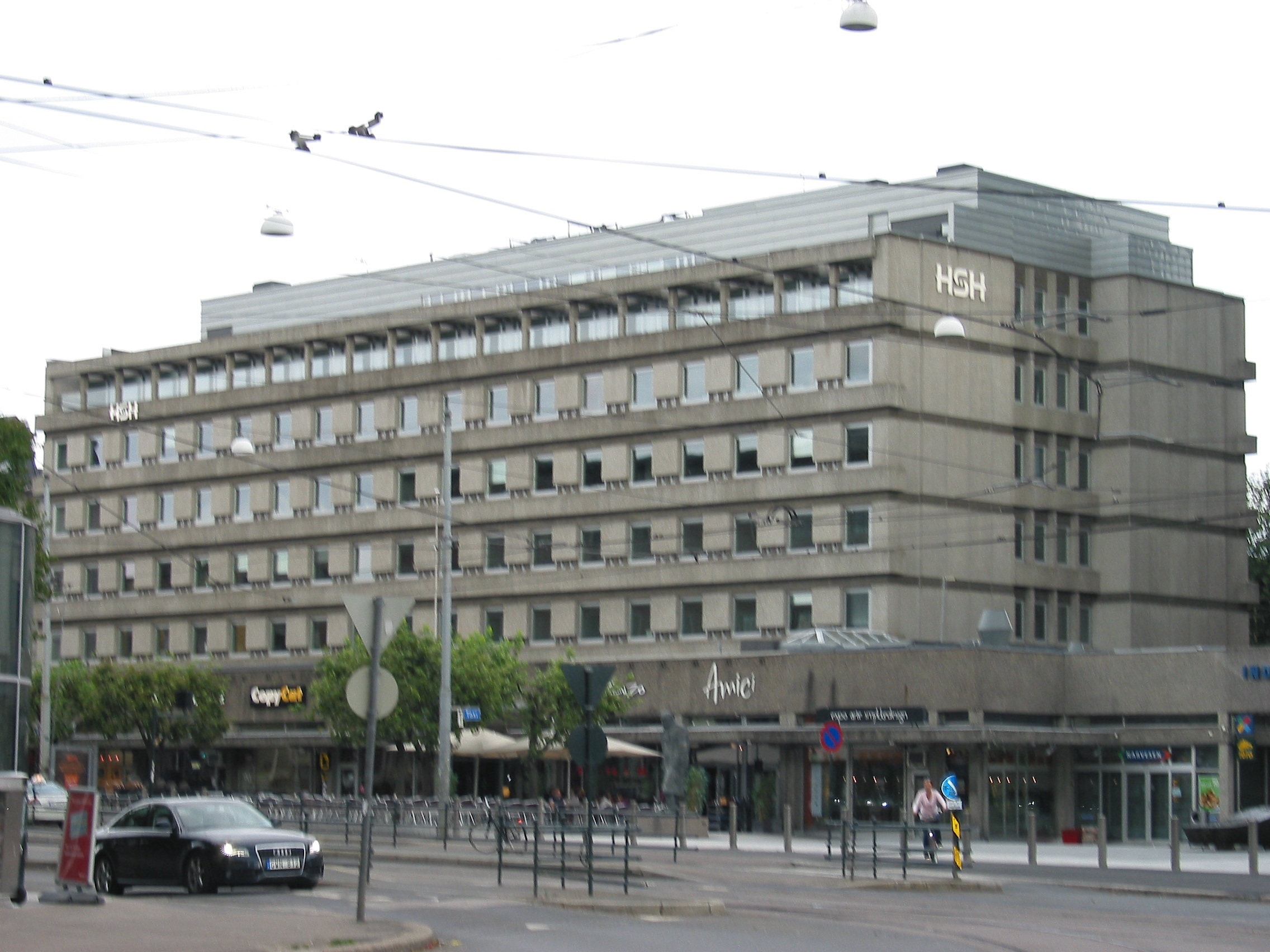
Headquarters, 2009.

The Federation of Norwegian Enterprise (Norwegian: Virke, formerly Handels- og Servicenæringens Hovedorganisasjon (HSH)) is an employers' organisation in Norway with more than 25,000 member companies.

It was established 1 of January 1990 through a merger. The headquarter is located at Solli plass in Frogner, Oslo.

The current chief executive is Bernt Gudmund Apeland. Chairman of the board is Margrethe Sunde.
