= List of Swedish politicians =

This is a list of Swedish politicians.

== 12th century ==
- Earl Birger Brosa (1174–1202)
- Folke the Fat

== 13th century ==
- Earl Birger (1210–1266)

== 14th century ==
- Saint Bridget of Sweden (1303–1373)

== 15th century ==
- Karl Knutsson Bonde (1409–1470)
- Engelbrekt Engelbrektsson (~1390–1436)
- Sten Sture the Elder (1440–1503)

== 16th century ==
- Christina Gyllenstierna (1494–1559)
- Gustav Vasa (1496–1560)
- Svante Nilsson Sture (1460–1512)
- Jöran Persson (1530–1568)
- Sten Sture the Younger (1492–1520)

== 17th century ==
- Gustav Bonde (1620–1667)
- Per Brahe (1602–1680)
- Magnus Gabriel De la Gardie (1622–1686)
- Axel Oxenstierna (1583–1654)
- Bengt Oxenstierna (1623–1702)
- Gabriel Oxenstierna (1587–1640)
- Johan Oxenstierna (1611–1657)
- Nils Brahe the younger (1633-1699)
- Johann Patkul (1660–1707)
- Anders Torstenson (1641–1686)

== 18th century ==
- Axel von Fersen, Sr. (1755–1810)
- Arvid Horn (1664–1742)
- Gustaf Adolf Reuterholm (1756–1813)
- Göran Magnus Sprengtporten (1740–1819)
- Jacob Magnus Sprengtporten (1727–1786)

== 19th century ==
- Nils Magnus Brahe (1790–1844)
- Axel von Fersen, Jr. (1755–1810)
- Louis De Geer (1818–1896)
- Carl Gustaf Nordin (1749–1812)
- Johan Gabriel Richert (1784–1864)

== 20th century ==
- Sven Aspling (1912–2000)
- Leif Bergdahl (born 1941)
- Leif Blomberg (1941–1998)
- Thorwald Bergquist (1899–1972)
- Carl Bildt (born 1949)
- Gösta Bohman (1911–1997)
- Anitha Bondestam (born 1941)
- Ingvar Carlsson (born 1934)
- Reidar Carlsson (born 1957)
- Birgitta Dahl (born 1937)
- Jerzy Einhorn (1925–2000)
- Birger Ekstedt (1921–1972)
- Tage Erlander (1901–1985)
- Thorbjörn Fälldin (1926–2016)
- Johan Forssell (1855-1914)
- Johan Friggeråker (1872–1959)
- Hans Gustafsson (1923–1998)
- Sture Henriksson (1917–1957)
- Sven Hulterström (born 1938)
- Johan Fredrik Kjellén (1881-1959)
- Kjell Larsson (1943–2002)
- Henning Leo (1885–1953)
- Märta Boman (1902–1986)
- Torsten Nilsson (1905–1997)
- Bengt Norling (1925–2002)
- Olof Palme (1927–1986)
- Ove Rainer (1925–1987)
- Gösta Skoglund (1903–1988)
- August Spångberg (1893–1987)
- Arvid Taube (1853–1916)
- Ola Ullsten (1931–2018)
- Lars Werner (1935–2013)

== 21st century ==
- Magdalena Andersson - former Prime minister
- Jan Björklund
- Gustav Kasselstrand - leader of Alternative for Sweden
- Inger Davidson
- Peter Eriksson
- Rickard Falkvinge
- Laila Freivalds (born 1942) - former Minister for Foreign Affairs
- Göran Hägglund
- Bo Holmberg
- Peter Hultqvist - former Defence minister
- Lars Leijonborg
- Ann Linde - former Foreign minister
- Anna Lindh (1957–2003) - Minister for Foreign Affairs (1998–2003); assassinated in 2003
- Bo Lundgren (born 1947)
- Mats Odell
- Maud Olofsson
- Marit Paulsen
- Göran Persson (born 1949)
- Fredrik Reinfeldt - former leader of the Moderate Party
- Bosse Ringholm
- Tomas Rudin
- Gudrun Schyman
- Jonas Sjöstedt
- Alf Svensson
- Björn von Sydow
- Per Westerberg - former speaker of the Parliament
- Maria Wetterstrand
- Stefan Löfven - former Prime minister
- Jimmie Åkesson
- Ulf Kristersson - Prime Minister
- Annie Lööf
- Nyamko Sabuni

== See also ==
- County Governors of Sweden
- Governor-General in the Swedish Realm
- List of political parties in Sweden
- List of Swedish monarchs
- List of Swedish Ministers for Foreign Affairs
- List of Swedish Prime Ministers
- Oxenstierna, (1583–1654), Sture
- Politics of Sweden
- Viceroy of Norway
