= Kjellén =

Kjellén is a surname. Notable people with the surname include:

- Johan Fredrik Kjellén (1881–1959), Swedish politician
- Lillebil Kjellén (1921–1994), Swedish actress
- Rudolf Kjellén (1864–1922), Swedish political scientist, geographer and politician
