= Viceroy of Norway =

Office during the Swedish-Norwegian Union (1814–1891)

- Vice-Konge
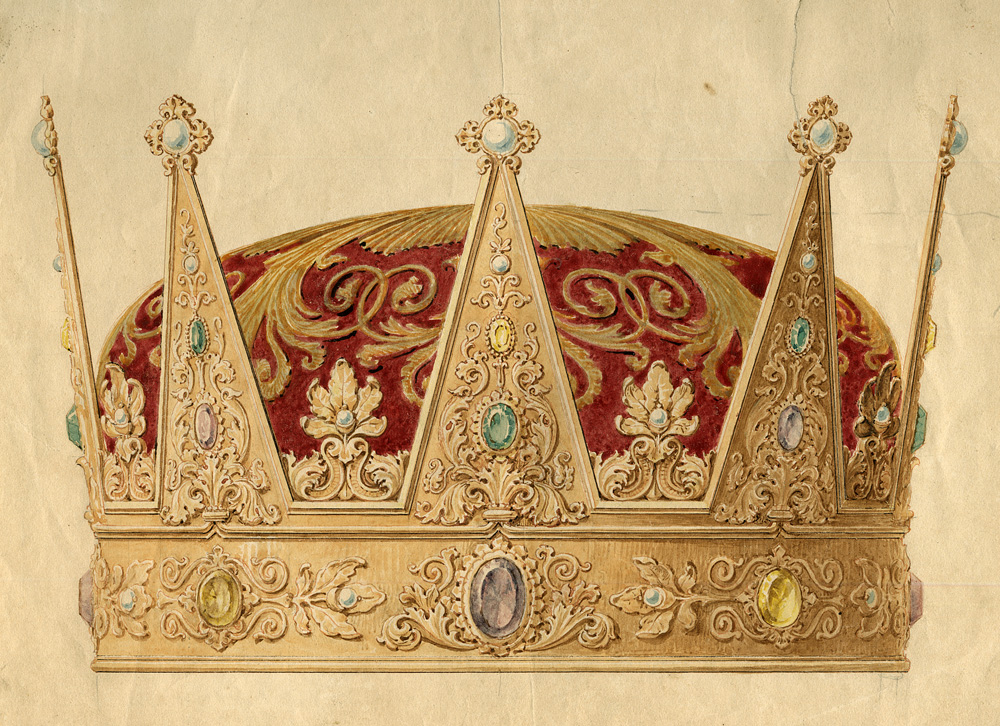
- Painting of the Norwegian Crown Prince's Crown, by Johannes Flintoe
- Residence: The Royal Palace
- Appointer: King of Norway
- Formation: 4 November 1814
- First holder: Charles John
- Final holder: Gustav
- Abolished: 30 June 1891
- Succession: Appointment

The Viceroy of Norway (Constitutional Danish: Vice-Konge) was the appointed head of the Norwegian Government in the absence of the King, during the union between Sweden and Norway (1814–1891). The role was essentially the same as that of the Governor-general, which has led to confusion as to who filled which office. Decisive, however, is that the title of Viceroy could only be held by the crown prince, or his oldest son, when he had come of age. Commoners with a similar mandate were merely styled Statholder (Governor-general).

== History ==
On 9 November 1814 the King appointed Crown Prince Carl Johan to the office, but it was vacated eight days later. Crown Prince Carl was the longest-serving Viceroy, sitting for about a year. The office was vacant most of the time, and it was ultimately abolished on 30 June 1891.

During the Kalmar Union, Christian II was viceroy from 1506 to 1513.

== List of Viceroys (Sweden-Norway) ==
Name	Portrait	Term start	Term end	Term length
Crown Prince Charles John		9 November 1814	17 November 1814	8 days
Crown Prince Charles John		10 June 1816	16 July 1816	36 days
Crown Prince Oscar		11 April 1824	1 November 1824	204 days
Crown Prince Oscar		17 June 1833	3 September 1833	78 days
Crown Prince Charles		17 June 1856	22 June 1857	370 days
Crown Prince Gustav		19 March 1884	26 March 1884	7 days

== See also ==
- Governor-general of Norway
- List of Norwegian monarchs
- List of Norwegian Prime Ministers

== Sources ==
- The Norwegian government: Viceroy in Norway
- The National Library of Norway: The Constitution of Norway, as of 4 November 1814 (in Danish)
