= Coronations in Norway =

Crowning of Norwegian monarch

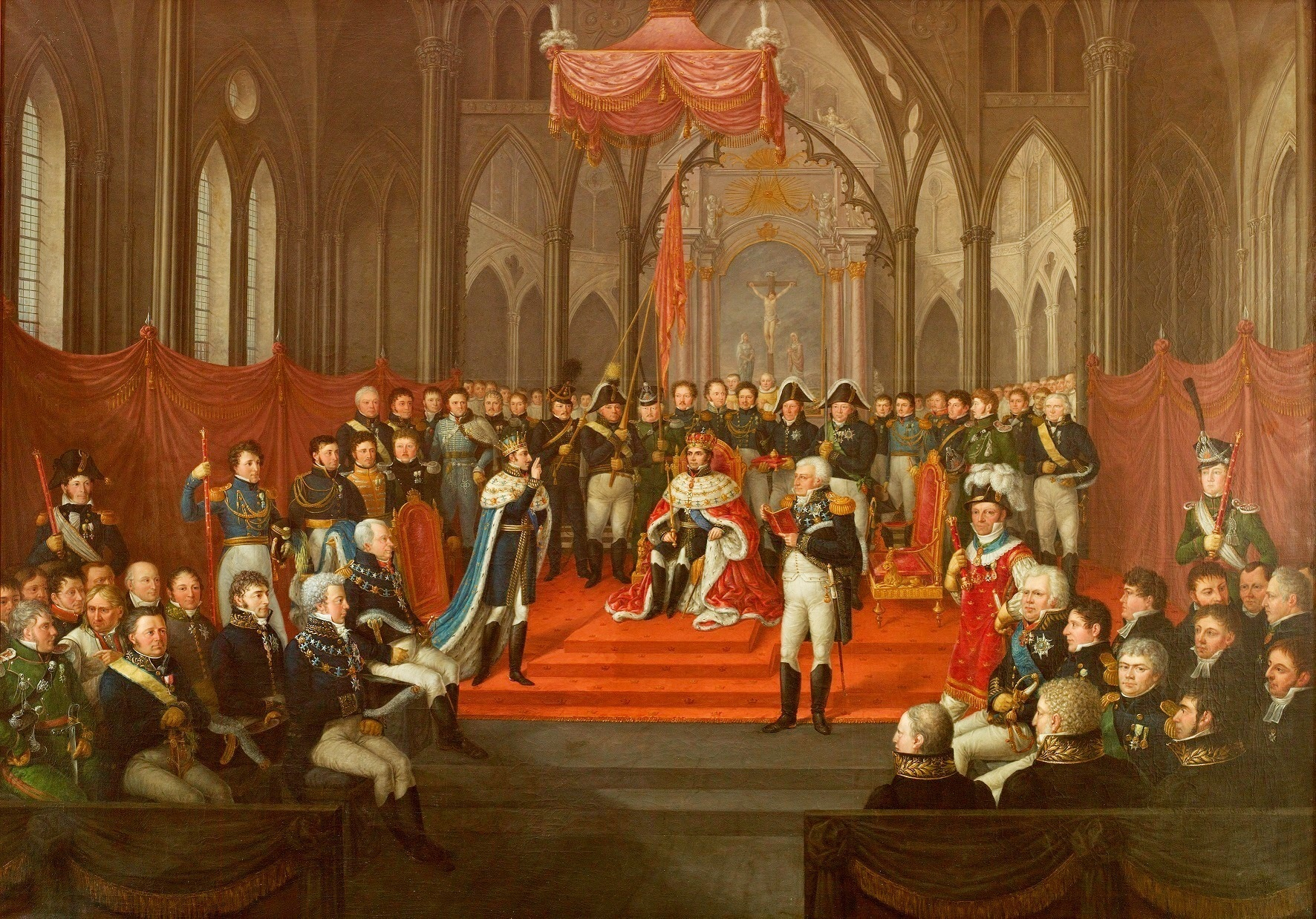
Coronation of Charles III John in Nidaros Cathedral 1818, by Jacob Munch

Coronations were held in Norway from 1164 to 1906, mostly in the Nidaros Cathedral in Trondheim. Although a crowning ceremony was formerly mandated by the nation's constitution, this requirement was eliminated in 1908. However, Norwegian kings have since chosen voluntarily to take part in a ritual of "benediction" to mark their accession to the throne, during which the crown is present, but not physically bestowed upon the sovereign. The new ceremony retains some of the religious elements of earlier rites, while eliminating other features now considered to be "undemocratic". There is no law preventing a coronation from occurring so any future monarch of Norway can choose to have one.

== History ==
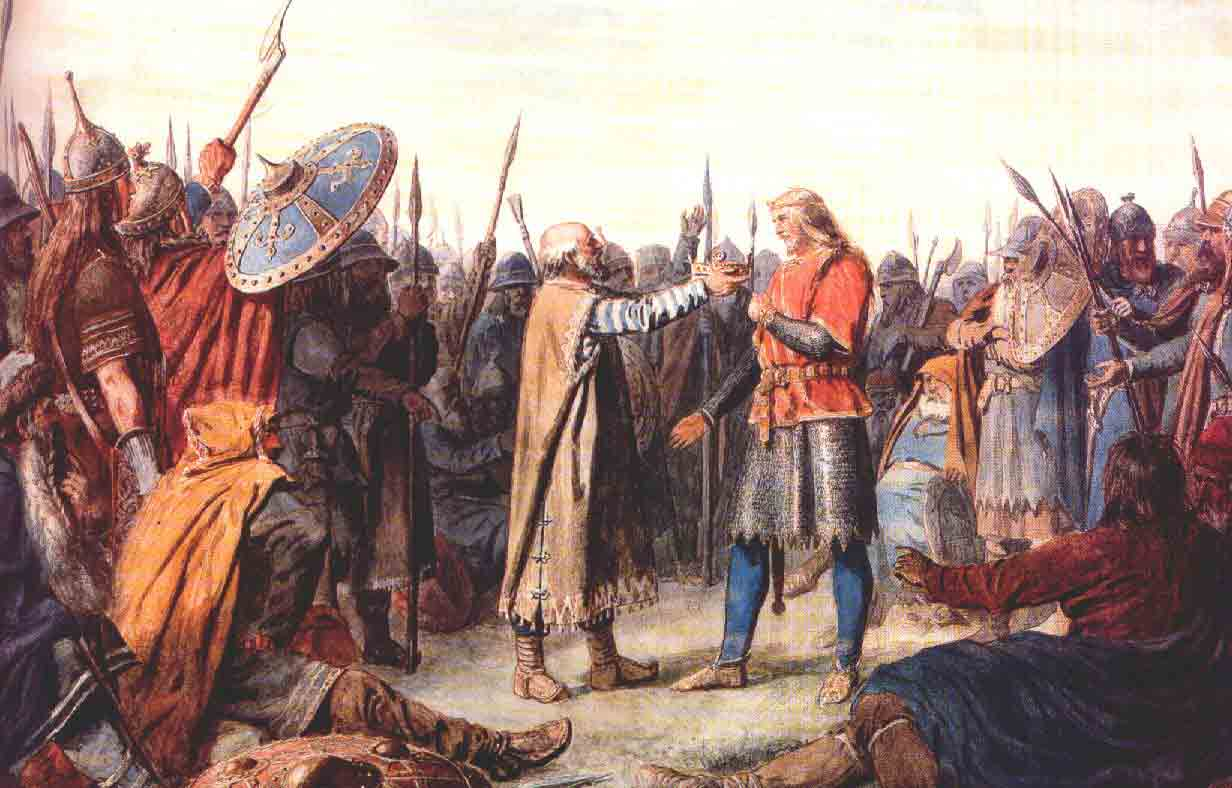
Crowning of Olav I of Norway

=== Early coronations ===
The first coronation in Norway—and in all of Scandinavia—took place in Bergen in 1163 or 1164. These rites continued in the Old Cathedral there until the capital was moved to Oslo under Haakon V of Norway. While some crownings were held in Oslo thereafter, most took place at Nidaros Cathedral, in Trondheim. Norwegian kings had historically been proclaimed (konungstekja in Old Norse) at the Øyrating in Trondheim, starting with Harald Fairhair or Haakon the Good in the 10th century; this continued even after the tradition of coronations began. Sometimes this led to competing claims: King Sverre, for example, was hailed as king at Øyrating in 1177, but not crowned until well after the death of King Magnus V in 1184. Ultimately, the coronation rite replaced the konungstekja ceremonies altogether until the resurrection of the latter in the modern benediction service.

=== Under the Danish union ===
In the late 14th century, Norway, Sweden, and Denmark were united in the Kalmar Union. During this era, monarchs were crowned in all three countries consecutively. After the federation was dissolved, Norway remained unified with Denmark under the Danish king until 1814. After the introduction of autocracy in Denmark in 1660, no further coronations took place in Norway until after the advent of the Constitution of Norway in 1814 and the Swedish Union, which took place during that same year. Throughout the Danish Union, the king of Denmark-Norway only went through one ceremony, in Denmark, in which he placed the crown upon his own head and was anointed.

=== During the Swedish union ===
The current constitution of Norway (1814) originally required the monarch to be crowned in Nidaros Cathedral in Trondheim. No coronation took place in the few months Christian Frederick was king of Norway, and Charles II, the first Swedish king of Norway under the new union, never visited the country during his reign and thus was never crowned. Once Charles III had ascended the throne, this rite resumed in accordance with the new constitution. While the Norwegian ritual closely followed the Swedish rite, the anointing of the king on the forehead and right wrist corresponded more closely to the Danish usage.

In September 1818, Charles III John was crowned in the first Norwegian coronation since 1660, providing a set of regalia for this purpose. His son Oscar had a Swedish coronet set upon his head and took the oath as crown prince. His wife, Désirée Clary, was in France at this time. Regalia for the queen was commissioned in 1830 for Desirée's intended coronation in Norway, but the ceremony never occurred. When Oscar and his wife, Josephine of Leuchtenberg, became king and queen, they were crowned in Sweden. Oscar's separate Norwegian coronation ceremony was delayed several times and ultimately never occurred, as the Bishop of Nidaros refused to crown the Queen unless she first abandoned her Roman Catholic faith and converted to Norway's official religion, Evangelical Lutheranism. The next coronation was that of Charles IV and Louise of the Netherlands in 1860. This was the first coronation of a Norwegian queen in several centuries. Oscar II and Sophia of Nassau were crowned in 1873.

=== Independence restored ===
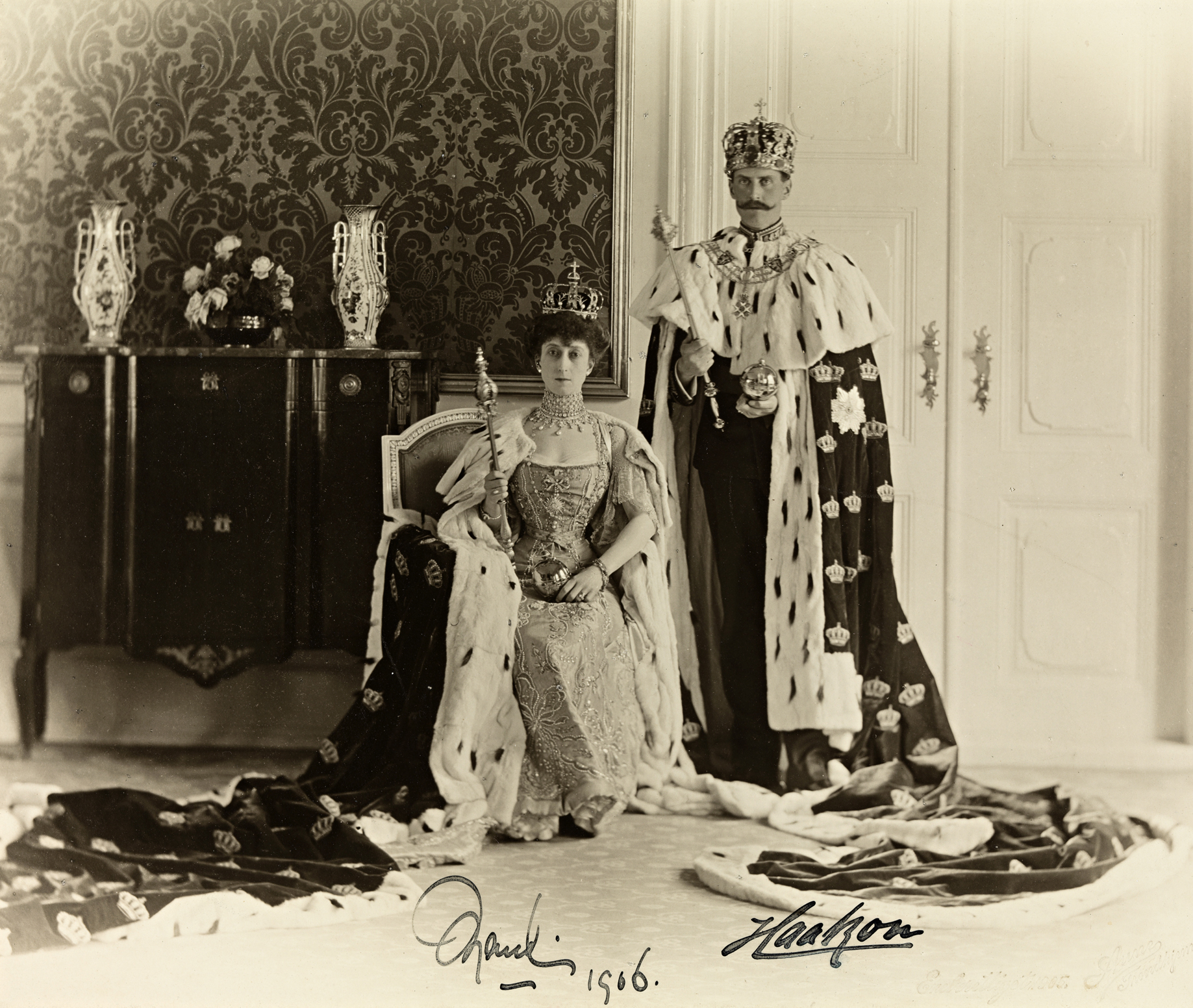
King Haakon VII and Queen Maud of Norway in 1906. Theirs was the last Norwegian coronation, to date.

The Swedish union was abolished in 1905, at which time Norway elected Prince Carl of Denmark, who took the name Haakon VII, as its new king. Haakon and his wife, Maud of Wales, were crowned at Trondheim on 22 June 1906, in keeping with the constitutional mandate. However, since many Norwegian statesmen had come to regard coronation rites as "undemocratic and archaic", this provision was repealed in 1908. Currently a new monarch is only required to take a formal accession oath in the Council of State, and then at the Parliament, the Storting.

Although coronations are not expressly banned under current Norwegian legislation, none have been held since 1906. Instead, the two sovereigns who followed Haakon VII have chosen to create a "benediction" ceremony to mark the beginning of their reigns. This new rite is held at Nidaros, and retains some of the religious elements of earlier coronation rituals while harking back to the old konungstekja rites held prior to the initial institution of coronations in the 12th century. The crown jewels are displayed, but not bestowed, during this ceremony.

== The Norwegian coronation ritual from 1818 to 1906 ==
=== Entrance procession ===
From 1818 to 1906, the Norwegian coronation ritual commenced with the king and queen making a procession to the Nidaros Cathedral preceded by the Norwegian Regalia. Once there, they were greeted by the Bishops of Trondheim, Kristiania (now Oslo) and Bergen and their attendant clergy with the words: "The Lord bless your going out and your coming in now and forevermore". Entering the cathedral, the monarchs seated themselves upon two canopied thrones in the choir.

=== The ceremony begins ===
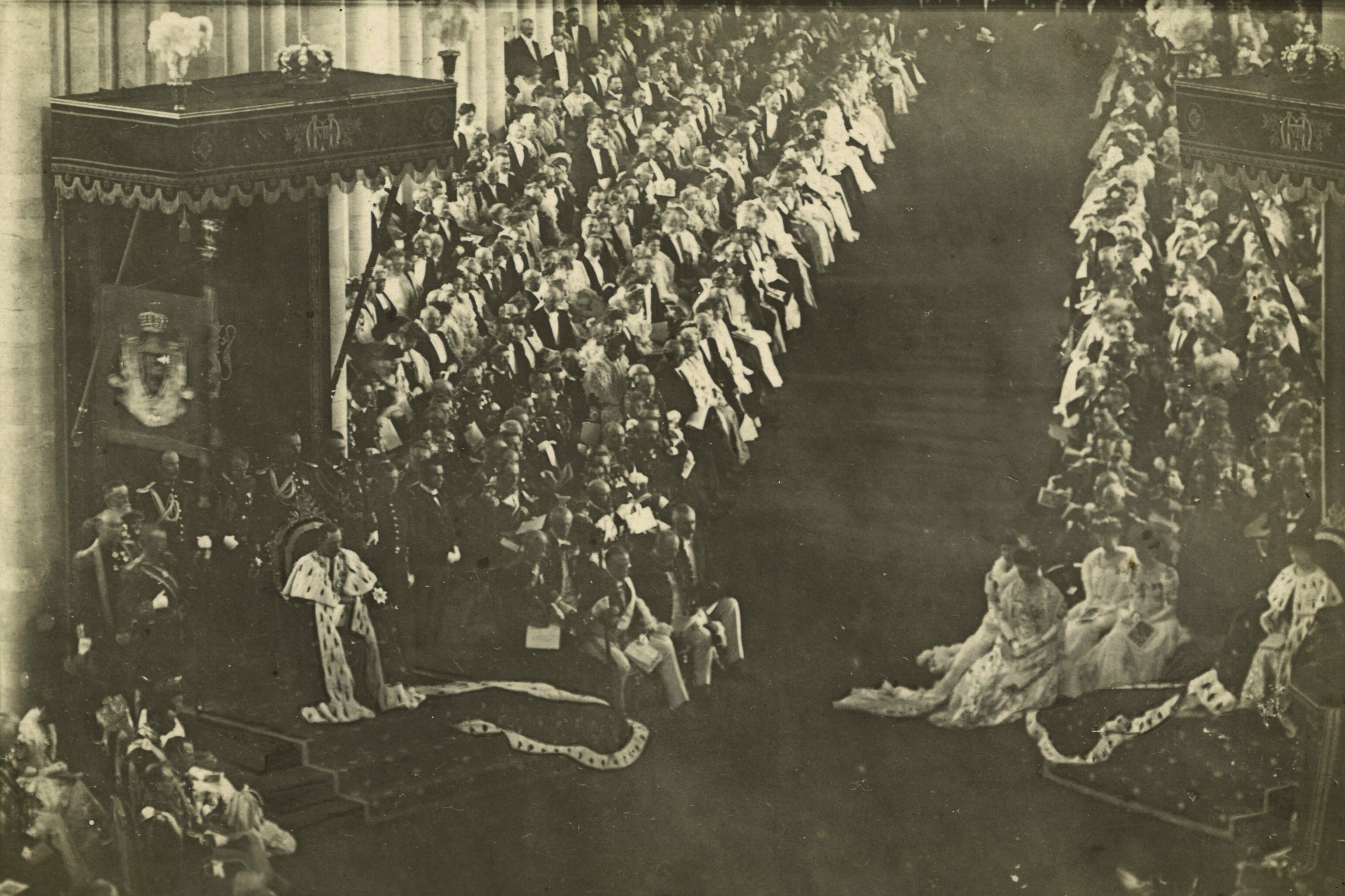
Haakon VII and Maud of Wales seated on their thrones during their coronation in 1906

Once the king and queen were seated, the Bishop of Trondheim began the ceremony by intoning the first line of the Introit hymn, which was then sung by the choir and the people. Next, the Bishop of Kristiania recited the Nicene Creed following which the Bishop of Bergen intoned the first six verses of the Te Deum. This was followed by a sermon, given by the Bishop of Kristiania. A priest and the choir sang a verse of a hymn, each singing alternate lines in turn. The choir next sang the first part of the Anthem, while the king proceeded to a throne set up for him on a dais before the altar, with the standard being held at his right. The king removed the mantle he had worn during the procession into the church, and it was laid on the altar as the royal mantle was taken from the altar and placed over his shoulders by the Bishop of Trondheim and the Chief Justice.

=== Anointing and crowning the king ===
After receiving his royal mantle, the king knelt before the altar as the Bishop of Trondheim anointed his right forearm and forehead with holy oil using a formula unique to the Norwegian rite. Following this, the king seated himself upon his throne and the bishop of Trondheim and the prime minister conjointly crowned him. The bishop of Trondheim and the foreign minister then handed the king the scepter; this was followed by the orb, which was handed to the king by the bishop of Trondheim and a Councilor of State. The bishop of Trondheim and another Councilor of State next handed the king the royal sword. Each item of the regalia was presented using a uniquely Norwegian formula. Once all of the crown jewels had been given to the sovereign, the choir sang the second part of the Anthem and a part of another hymn, after which the bishop of Trondheim said a prayer for the newly crowned king and gave him his blessing. The king then returned to his throne in the choir wearing his crown and bearing his scepter and orb.

=== Anointing and crowning the queen ===
Now the queen left her canopied throne in the choir and proceeded to her throne before the altar, as the choir sang the third part of the Anthem and part of yet another hymn. She was robed in the royal mantle and then knelt as the bishop of Trondheim anointed her on her right forearm and forehead. She then seated herself on her throne, and was in turned crowned and given her scepter and orb by the bishop using formulas appropriately modified from those used for the king. Afterwards, the fourth part of the anthem was sung by the choir, together with portions of another hymn. The bishop of Trondheim said a prayer for the queen and blessed her, using a form similar to those used for the king. The queen then returned to her throne in the choir bearing her regalia.

=== Conclusion ===
After the crowning of the queen, the President of the Storting stood up and proclaimed the coronation act to have been duly performed. Following this, two verses of the hymn "God bless our dear Fatherland" were sung, and then the fifth part of the Anthem was sung by the choir while the bishops and clergy left the sanctuary. The king and queen then proceeded out of the cathedral wearing their coronation mantles and regalia, thus concluding the ceremony.

== The modern "benediction" rite (after 1906) ==
At the beginning of the 20th century the act of coronation had become widely viewed as an anachronism by Norwegian politicians, and two years after King Haakon VII and Queen Maud were crowned the provision requiring a coronation was removed from the Constitution with only two votes against in the Parliament. When Olav V became king in 1957 he introduced a new tradition of benediction (or consecration) in the Nidaros Cathedral. He was followed in this by his son, Harald V, in 1991.

=== Olav V ===
External videos
- Images of Olav V's benediction may be viewed here

When Olav V ascended the throne in 1957, he felt the need for a religious ceremony not only to commence his reign, but also to enter upon his duties as the new head of the Church of Norway. Understanding why a coronation ceremony was no longer mandated, Olav proposed the creation instead of a ritual of royal consecration, to be known as Signing til kongsgjerning (i.e., 'Blessing the King for his Reign'), to be held on 22 June 1958. Although the government of Prime Minister Einar Gerhardsen was initially open to this idea, several ministers and members of the Storting ultimately chose to attend what became a major national event. Carried by radio throughout the kingdom, the ceremony saw the king seat himself upon the 1818 coronation throne in Nidaros Cathedral, where he listened to a sermon. Following this, he knelt before the high altar, where Bishop Arne Fjellbu laid his hand on the king's head and recited a special prayer of consecration and blessing which formed the climax of the ritual:

Eternal, Almighty God, Heavenly Father, we thank thee whose grace in need has always gone over our land in woeful and good times to this day. Hear, today, our king's and our prayer. We pray thee, send thy grace to King Olav the Fifth, assist him by thy Spirit and give him wisdom and peace from thee that his reign be a benefit and a blessing on Norway's land and people. Deceitful and burdensome days will come; may truth and goodness from thee be his power and gladness. Eternal, powerful God, bless our king, be thou always his Lord and his King and grant his House all good days in time and eternity. Amen.

Olav would later refer to this event as the high point of his life.

=== Harald V ===
Upon Olav's death in 1991, his successor Harald V and his wife Sonja expressed their wish to be consecrated as Olav had been. Accordingly, on 23 June 1991, they attended a service of consecration at Nidaros Cathedral, presided over by Bishop Finn Wagle, assisted by the Bishop of Oslo, Andreas Aarflot. The Crown Jewels of Norway had been placed inside the cathedral prior to the ceremony, with the king's and queen's crowns arranged each on their respective side of the high altar.

External image
- A video of a portion of Harald V's benediction may be viewed here.

On entering the cathedral the king and queen were met by bishops Wagle and Aarflot and Bishop Wagle greeted them with the words: "May the Lord bless your going in and your coming out now and for evermore." The king and queen proceeded through the nave and seated themselves on the 1818 coronation thrones. After scriptural readings and a sermon, King Harald came forward and knelt before the high altar, where Bishop Wagle put his right hand on his head and said the consecration prayer, including the petition, "Bless King Harald the Fifth, strengthen him and in the exercise of his solemn responsibilities." Queen Sonja then came forward and knelt beside the king and Bishop Wagle lay his right hand on her head and said a prayer asking God to help her use her talents to benefit the Norwegian people and land. The bishop then said a prayer over both the kneeling king and queen and turned and knelt at the high altar as the Royal Anthem was sung. He then rose and turned to pronounce a concluding blessing on the kneeling king and queen: "The grace of our Lord Jesus Christ, the love of God and the fellowship of the Holy Spirit, be with you. Amen." The Lord Chamberlain then came forward, as the king and queen rose and turned, and conducted them back to their coronation thrones.

=== Haakon VIII ===
Following Harald's death in 2026, the Royal House of Norway announced that the consecration of Haakon VIII and his wife Mette-Marit would be held on 22 August 2027.

== Historical list of coronations ==
The following is a list of royal coronations in Norway from the 12th century through the modern era. For kings reigning before the independent Norway of 1905 the modern Norwegian name forms are given in parentheses where relevant.

=== Christ Church (Old Cathedral), Bergen ===
The first coronation in Norway, and Scandinavia, took place in Bergen in 1163 or 1164. The Christ Church (Old Cathedral) in Bergen remained the place of coronations in Norway until the capital was moved to Oslo with King Haakon V.

Coronation	Picture	Name	Reign	Other regnal titles
1163/1164		Magnus V	1161 – June 15, 1184	
June 29, 1194		Sverre Sigurdsson	1184 – March 9, 1202	
July 29, 1247		Haakon IV with Margaret Skulesdatter	1217 – December 16, 1263	
September 14, 1261		Magnus VI (Magnus VI Lagabøte) with Ingeborg of Denmark	December 16, 1263 – May 9, 1280	
1280		Eric II	May 9, 1280 – 1299	
1281		Margaret of Scotland (consort of Eric II Magnusson)		

=== Oslo ===
When King Haakon V succeeded his brother, the capital of Norway was moved from Bergen to Oslo, where it has remained. The other coronations in Oslo took place during the Kalmar Union (note the overlap with Trondheim).

Coronation	Picture	Name	Reign	Other regnal titles
1299		Haakon V with Euphemia of Rügen	November 1, 1299 – May 8, 1319	
July 2, 1442		Christopher of Bavaria	1442 – January 5, 1448	King of Denmark; King of Sweden
July 29, 1514		Christian II	July 22, 1513 – January 20, 1523	King of Denmark; King of Sweden

=== Nidaros Cathedral, Trondheim ===
With King Charles I in 1449 the Nidaros Cathedral in Trondheim became the place of coronations in Norway, and, with the exception of King Christian II, has remained so. The first three took place during the Kalmar Union, and later the tradition was re-established with the Constitution of Norway of 1814 and the Union between Sweden and Norway. In the intermediate period, during the time of the double monarchy of Denmark–Norway, a joint coronation was held in Copenhagen with both a Norwegian and a Danish bishop present.

Coronation	Picture	Name	Reign	Other regnal titles
November 20, 1449		Charles I	November 20, 1449 – June, 1450	King of Sweden
August 2, 1450		Christian I	1450 – May 21, 1481	King of Denmark; King of Sweden
July 20, 1483		John	1483 – July 22, 1513	King of Denmark; King of Sweden
September 7, 1818		Charles III John	February 5, 1818 – March 8, 1844	King of Sweden
August 5, 1860		Charles IV with Louise of the Netherlands	July 8, 1859 – September 18, 1872	King of Sweden
July 18, 1873		Oscar II with Sofia of Nassau	September 18, 1872 – October 26, 1905	King of Sweden
June 22, 1906		Haakon VII with Maud of Wales	November 18, 1905 – September 21, 1957	

== List of benedictions ==
Benediction	Picture	Name	Reign	Other regnal titles
June 22, 1958		Olav V	September 21, 1957 – January 17, 1991	
June 23, 1991		Harald V with Sonja Haraldsen	January 17, 1991 – August 28, 2026	
August 22, 2027		Haakon VIII with Mette-Marit Tjessem Høiby	August 28, 2026 – present	

== See also ==
- Norwegian monarchy
- List of Norwegian monarchs
- Throne Chairs of Norway
- Throne Chair of Denmark
- Norwegian Royal Regalia

== Sources and external links ==
- Riksregaliene: Kroninger og signinger (in Norwegian)
- Histos forlag: Historical Bergen
- Norwegian Coronations
- NRK Trøndelag: Kroninger i Nidarosdomen (in Norwegian)
- Consecration of Harald, 1991. NRK.
- Aftenposten: Første folkekonge, siste kroning (in Norwegian)
- Kongehuset: Dagens monarki - Signing (in Norwegian)
