= Johan Friggeråker =

Swedish politician

Johan Friggeråker (1872–1959), called Johan Johansson i Friggeråker in the Swedish Parliament (Swedish: Riksdag), was a Swedish politician and farmer. He was a member of the Centre Party.

Friggeråker was born 28 August 1872 in Valunda, Norra Åsarps parish, Sweden. He was a member of the First Chamber of Parliament 1919–1947 in the constituency of Älvsborg County and a member of the Banking Committee in 1920. He was elected as a county councillor in Skaraborg County in 1930.

Friggeråker died 1 February 1959 in Falköping, Sweden.

== Family ==
His parents were Anders Petter Johansson (1837–1916), a farmer, and Josefina Albertina Johansson (1844–1889). Friggeråker was married to Ester Josefina, née Thorstensson (1875–1956) and the couple had twelve children.
