= Queen of Norway's Crown =

Crown belonging to the Queen of Norway

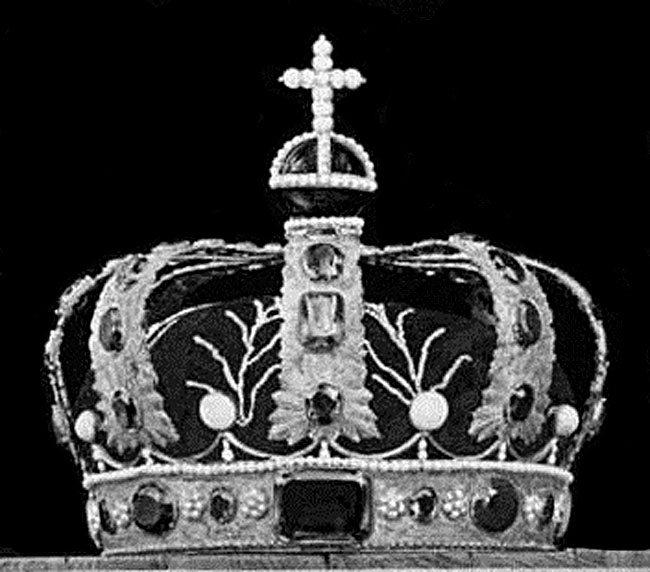
- The Queen's Crown of Norway

Details
- Country: Norway
- Made: 1830
- Material: Silver-gilt, gold

The Queen's Crown of Norway is part of the Norwegian royal regalia. It was made in 1830 for the intended coronation of Désirée Clary as Queen consort of Norway. Her coronation did not take place, and the crown was first used in 1860 for the coronation of Louise of the Netherlands.

The crown was made in Stockholm. Its maker is uncertain, although it has traditionally been attributed to the royal jeweller Marc Giron. Erik Lundberg has also been suggested as its maker, while another possibility is that both were involved in its production. The design was probably based on the Swedish queen consort's crown.

The crown is made of silver-gilt and gold and is decorated with multicoloured gemstones and pearls, including violet amethysts, yellow citrine and topaz, and green chrysoprase. It weighs approximately 530 g (19 oz).

== See also ==
- Regalia of Norway
