= Gustaf Bonde (1620–1667) =

Swedish statesman (1620–1667)

Baron Gustaf Bonde the Elder
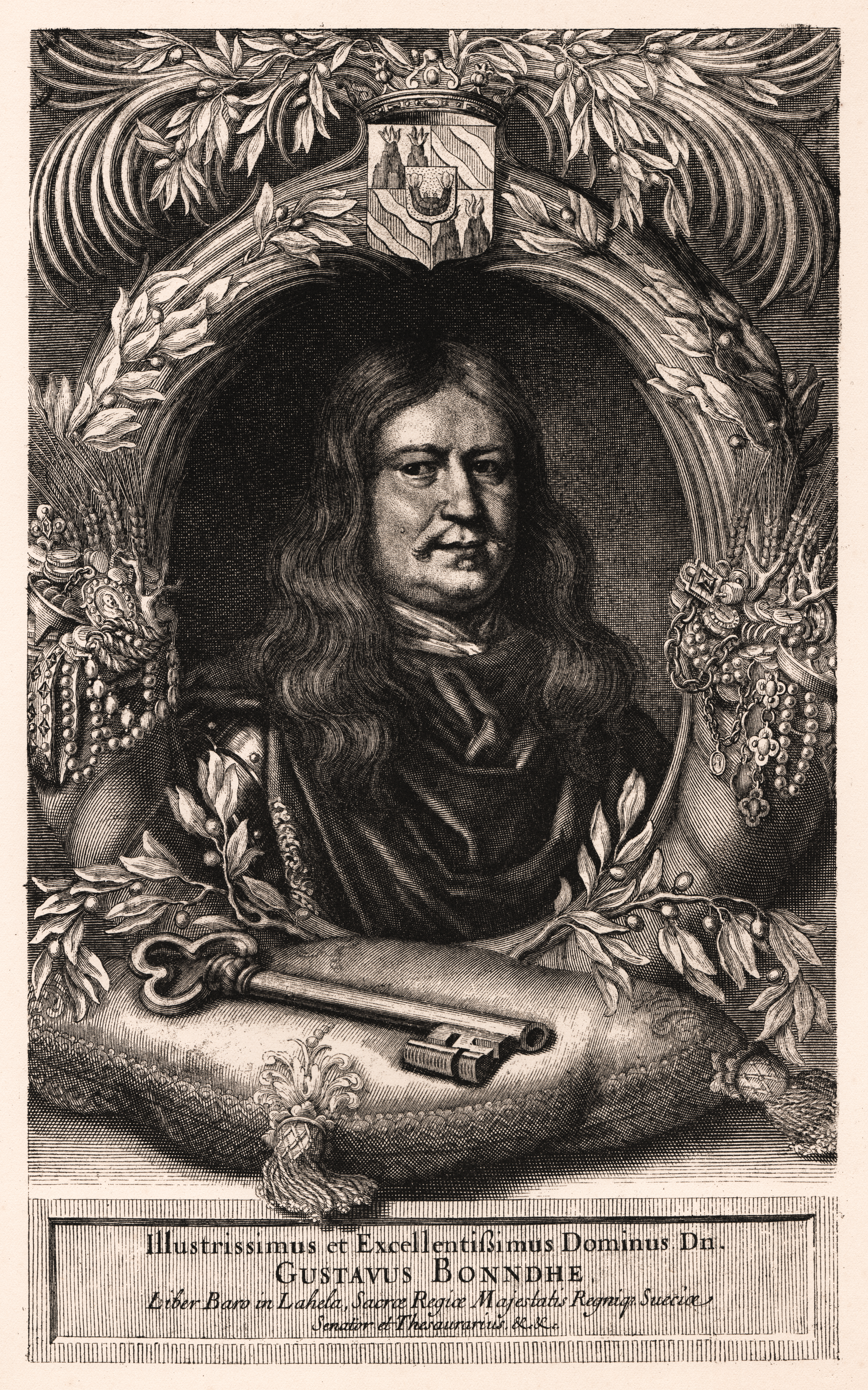
- Gustaf Bonde on a contemporary engraving

Lord High Treasurer of Sweden
- In office 1660–1667
- Preceded by: Herman Fleming
- Succeeded by: Seved Bååt

5th Governor of Södermanland County
- In office 1648–1653
- Preceded by: Hans Rotkirch
- Succeeded by: Göran Bengtsson Sparre

Personal details
- Born: 1 February 1620 Pargas, Finland
- Died: 25 May 1667 (aged 47) Hamburg
- Spouses: Maria Elisabet Ulfsparre; Anna Kristina Natt och Dag

Baron Gustaf Bonde (4 February 1620 – 25 May 1667) was a Swedish statesman. He was a persistent advocate of a pacifist policy at a time when war on the slightest provocation was the watchword of every Swedish politician.

Even the popular Polish adventure of Charles X Gustav of Sweden was strenuously opposed by Bonde, though when once it was decided upon he materially assisted the king to find the means for carrying it on. He was also in favour of strict economy coupled with the recovery of the royal domains which had fallen into the hands of the nobles, though his natural partiality for his fellow-peers came out clearly enough when in 1655 he was appointed a member of Charles X Gustav's land-recovery commission. In 1660 he succeeded Herman Fleming as Lord High Treasurer, and was one of the council of regency appointed to govern Sweden during the minority of Charles XI of Sweden.

In 1661 he presented to the Privy Council a plan which aimed at rendering Sweden altogether independent of foreign subsidies, by a policy of peace, economy and trade-development, and by further recovery of alienated estates. His budget in the following year, framed on the same principles, subsequently served as an invaluable guide to Charles XI. Bonde's extraordinary tenacity of purpose enabled him for some years to carry out his programme, despite the opposition of the majority of the senate and his co-regents, who preferred the more adventurous methods of the chancellor Magnus Gabriel De la Gardie, ultimately so ruinous to Sweden. But the ambition of the oligarchs, and the fear and jealousy of innumerable monopolists who rose in arms against his policy of economy, proved at last too strong for Bonde, while the costly and useless expedition against Bremen in 1665, undertaken contrary to his advice, completed the ruin of the finances.

In his later years Bonde's powers of resistance were weakened by sickness and mortification at the triumph of reckless extravagance, and he practically retired from the government some time before his death.

== See also ==
- List of Swedish politicians
- List of Södermanland Governors
