= Regalia of Norway =

Items symbolising the Norwegian monarch's power and majesty

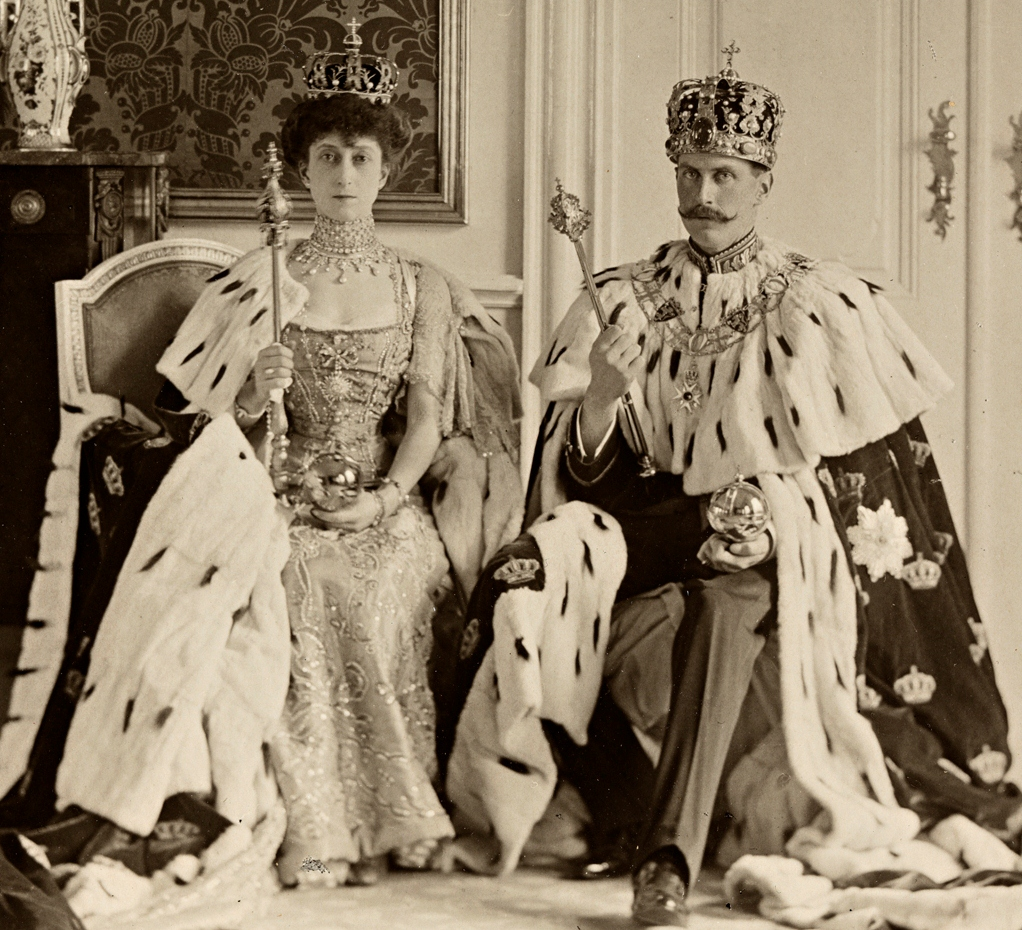
Haakon VII and Maud of Wales with the regalia on the occasion of their coronation

The regalia of Norway are objects that symbolise the power and majesty of the Norwegian monarch. Little is known about the old Norwegian regalia, which have since been lost. Most of the present regalia date from 1818 and were made for the coronation of Jean-Baptiste Bernadotte as King Carl III Johan of Norway.

The Norwegian royal regalia comprise nine principal items: the king's crown, the sword of the realm, the king's sceptre, the king's orb, the queen's crown, the queen's sceptre, the queen's orb, the crown prince's coronet, and the anointing horn. The collection also includes several mantles, two banners of the realm, and coronation thrones.

The last Norwegian king and queen to be crowned were Haakon VII and his wife, Maud of Wales, in 1906. Since then, the regalia have not been used to crown or be worn by succeeding monarchs. Certain items are nevertheless still used on ceremonial occasions. During the monarch's consecration, for example, the crown is displayed, while at the monarch's funeral it may be placed on the coffin.

== History ==
During Norway's union with Denmark, the king underwent a coronation ceremony in Denmark. When this union was dissolved in 1814, Norway declared its independence and adopted its own constitution. However, total independence was short-lived as Norway would be compelled to enter into a personal union with Sweden and sharing the same monarch and foreign policy.

A coronation was required among the provisions in Norway's 1814 constitution. The old Norwegian regalia had been lost and no Norwegian regalia was available for use when preparations were made for the coronation of King Carl Johan in 1818. The king would pay for the essential regalia himself. The regalia of the king and the anointing horn were made for this coronation. The regalia of the queen were acquired in 1830 for the planned coronation of Carl Johan's wife, Désirée Clary. This coronation never took place. All the regalia were made in Sweden except the crown of the crown prince which was made in Norway in 1848 and the sword of state which was a gift from Charles John to the Norwegian state. The coronet of the crown prince was ordered for use in the planned coronation of Oscar I and Josephine of Leuchtenberg, as the Norwegian parliament wanted the heir apparent to the throne, the future Charles IV to take part in the ceremony. However Oscar I was never to be crowned in Norway because the bishop of Nidaros refused to crown the Catholic Josephine. The sword of state was initially a gift from Napoleon Bonaparte to Charles III John, then known as Jean-Baptiste Bernadotte, when he was appointed Marshal of France. Charles III John carried the sword during the Battle of Leipzig; when he acquired the Norwegian regalia in 1818, he had the blade of the sword refashioned, in order that its symbolic language might correspond better to its new function.

The coronation that followed Charles III John's was that of Charles IV and his wife, Louise of the Netherlands, in 1860. Oscar II and Sophie of Nassau were crowned in 1873.

Following the dissolution of the union with Sweden in 1905, Norway elected a Danish prince to serve as its own king. King Haakon VII, his wife Maud, and their son Olav arrived in Norway on 25 November and Haakon took the required oath as King two days later. As required by the constitution, Haakon (along with his wife) was subsequently crowned and anointed the following year on 22 June 1906 at the Nidaros Cathedral in Trondheim. This was the last time the regalia were to be used for a coronation as the provision in the Norwegian constitution requiring the monarch's coronation was repealed in 1908. The coronet of the crown prince has never been used: Crown Prince Olav was too young to participate in the ceremony in 1906.

The regalia are now on display in the Archbishop's Palace, next to the Nidaros Cathedral. Certain items from the regalia collection are still used occasionally such as during the monarch's consecration, where the crown is displayed; or during the monarch's funeral service, where it is placed atop the casket.

In 2006, Harald V made a speech where he emphasised that the Norwegian Crown symbolises a free, independent and democratic nation.

== Individual items in the regalia ==
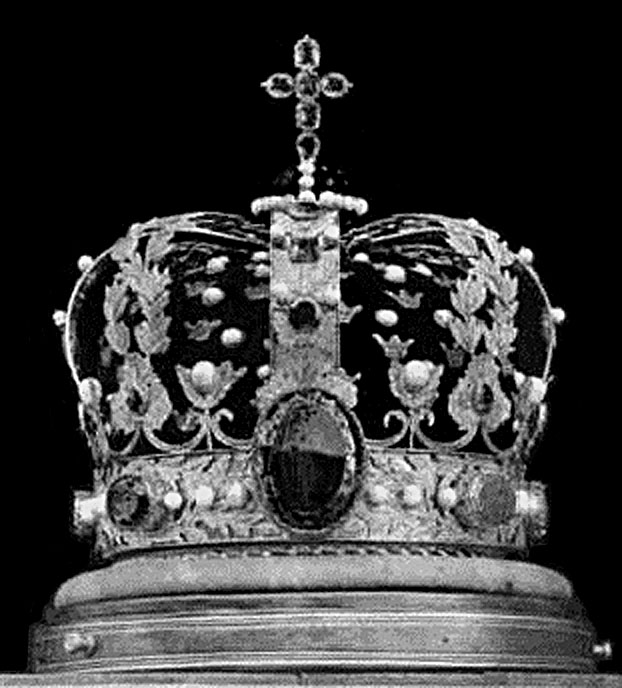
King's crown of Norway

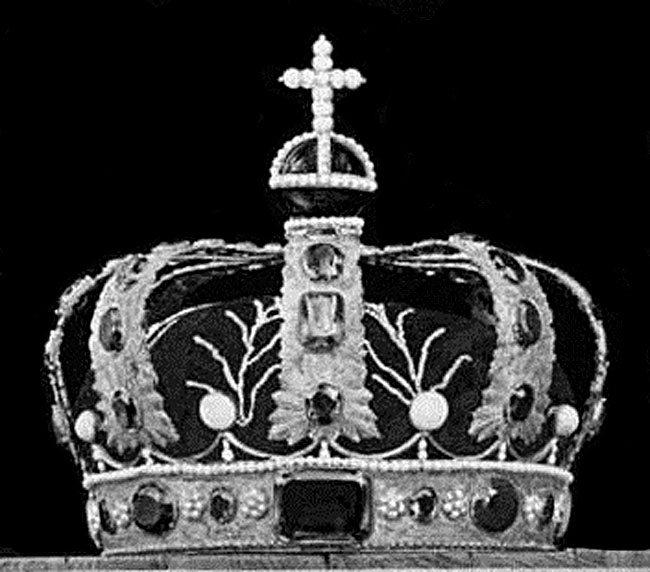
Queen's crown of Norway

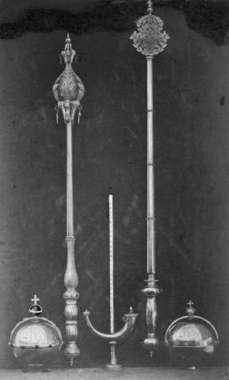
The sceptres and orbs of the King and the Queen with the anointing horn

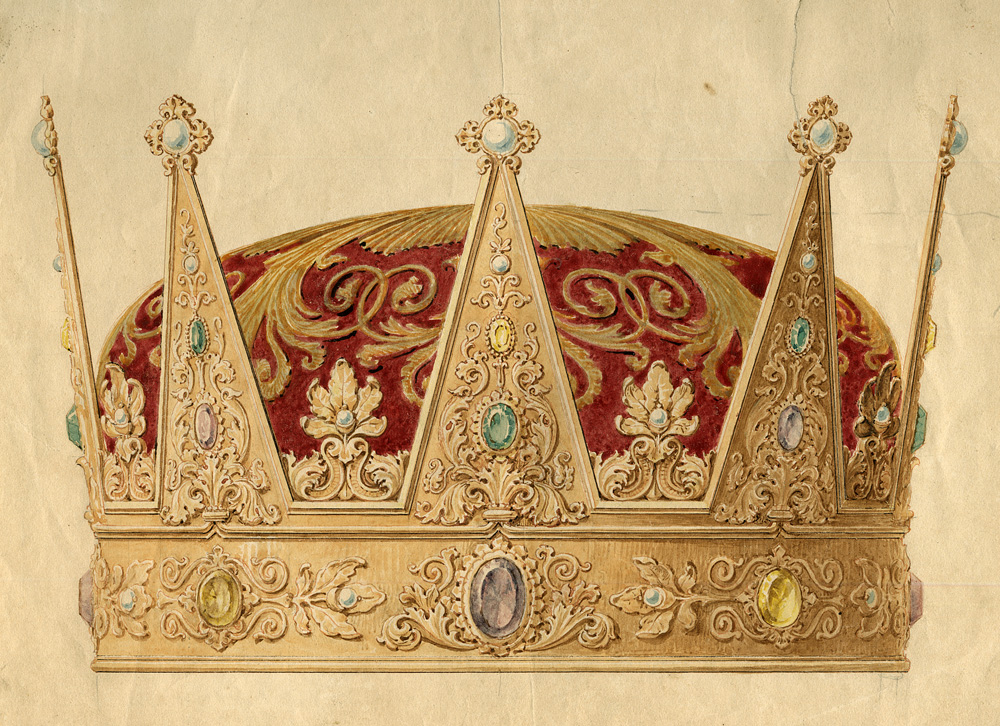
Crown Prince's coronet, by Johannes Flintoe

- The King's Crown: made in Stockholm in 1818 by goldsmith Olof Wihlborg, the crown is a gold corona clausa (closed crown) decorated with amethysts, chrysoprases, pearls and other gemstones. Its most prominent stone is a large green tourmaline, presented to King Charles III Johan by the Brazilian consul in Stockholm. Eight half-arches rise from the circlet and support a blue enamelled monde topped by a Latin cross set with amethysts. The crown is lined with red velvet decorated with pearls and gold embroidery.
- King's orb: made in Stockholm in 1818 by goldsmith Adolf Zethelius (1781–1864) is a 10 cm sphere of gilt silver and with a 1 cm wide equator and meridian decorated with small roses. The King's orb is footed and at the top the meridian bears a miniature orb and cross.
- King's sceptre: made in Stockholm in 1818 by goldsmith Adolf Zethelius is a 75 cm rod of gilt silver. At the top of this rod is a diminutive orb and cross, immediately below which it is surrounded with open work foliage of oak leaves, while the knobs on either side of the grip are decorated with the roses similar to those found on the King's orb.
- Anointing horn: made in Stockholm in 1818 by goldsmith Adolf Zethelius of gilt silver and has the form of upturned and footed bull's horn with the open end closed with a chained lid topped with an acorn and with a miniature royal crown on the tip of the horn. It was obviously inspired by the anointing horn in the Swedish regalia, which also has the form of an upturned and footed bull's horn.
- Sword of the Realm: Made in the early 19th century. Tradition has it that it was a gift from Napoleon Bonaparte to the future king of Sweden and Norway, Jean-Baptiste Bernadotte, when he was made Marshal of France, and which he carried as Swedish Crown Prince at the battle of Leipzig. He had a new hilt, grip and scabbard in gilt bronze made for this sword, appropriate to its new use as the Norwegian Sword of the Realm. Inlaid panels of mother of pearl decorate the grip and scabbard. Engravings of oak leaves on the scabbard, hilt and grip and an acorn at the tip of the grip correspond to the oak leaves and acorns also found on the crown and sceptre.
- The Queen's Crown: made in Stockholm in 1830 by goldsmith Erik Lundberg and modelled on the Swedish queen consort's crown. The gold corona clausa is decorated with amethysts, topazes, chrysoprases, and pearls. Eight half-arches rise from the circlet and support a blue enamelled monde topped by a pearl cross. The crown is lined with red velvet embroidered with seed pearls and topped with a gold button set with a large pearl.
- Queen's orb: made in Stockholm in 1830 is a 10 cm sphere of gilt silver with a 1 cm equator and meridian set with faceted amethysts. The Queen's orb is footed and on the top the meridian bears a miniature blue enamelled orb with an equator and meridian band set with small pearls bearing at its top a cross also set with small pearls.
- Queen's sceptre: made in Stockholm in 1830 is a 70 cm rod of gilt silver. At its head the rod is set with four rows of five faceted oval amethysts, diminishing in size from bottom to top, encased between four acanthus leaves. From each of four large scrolls below this head and from four smaller scrolls above it hang drop shaped pendant each set with a drop-shaped amethyst, the scrolls, pendants and their amethysts below being significantly larger than those above. The grip of the Queen's sceptre has a banister-like shape embossed with design of acanthus leaves.
- The Crown Prince's Coronet: made in Norway in 1846 by goldsmith Herman Colbjørnsen Øyset and modelled on the Swedish crown prince's coronet. The gold corona aperta (open coronet) is decorated with amethysts, citrines, peridots, and rare Norwegian freshwater pearls. It has eight triangular points decorated with gemstones and pearls and is lined with red velvet richly embroidered in gold thread.

== See also ==
- Crown jewels
- Royal coronations in Norway
- Norwegian monarchy
- Coat of arms of Norway
