= Monarchy of Norway =

King of Norway
- Norges konge (Bokmål); Noregs konge (Nynorsk)
- Royal coat of arms of Norway

Incumbent
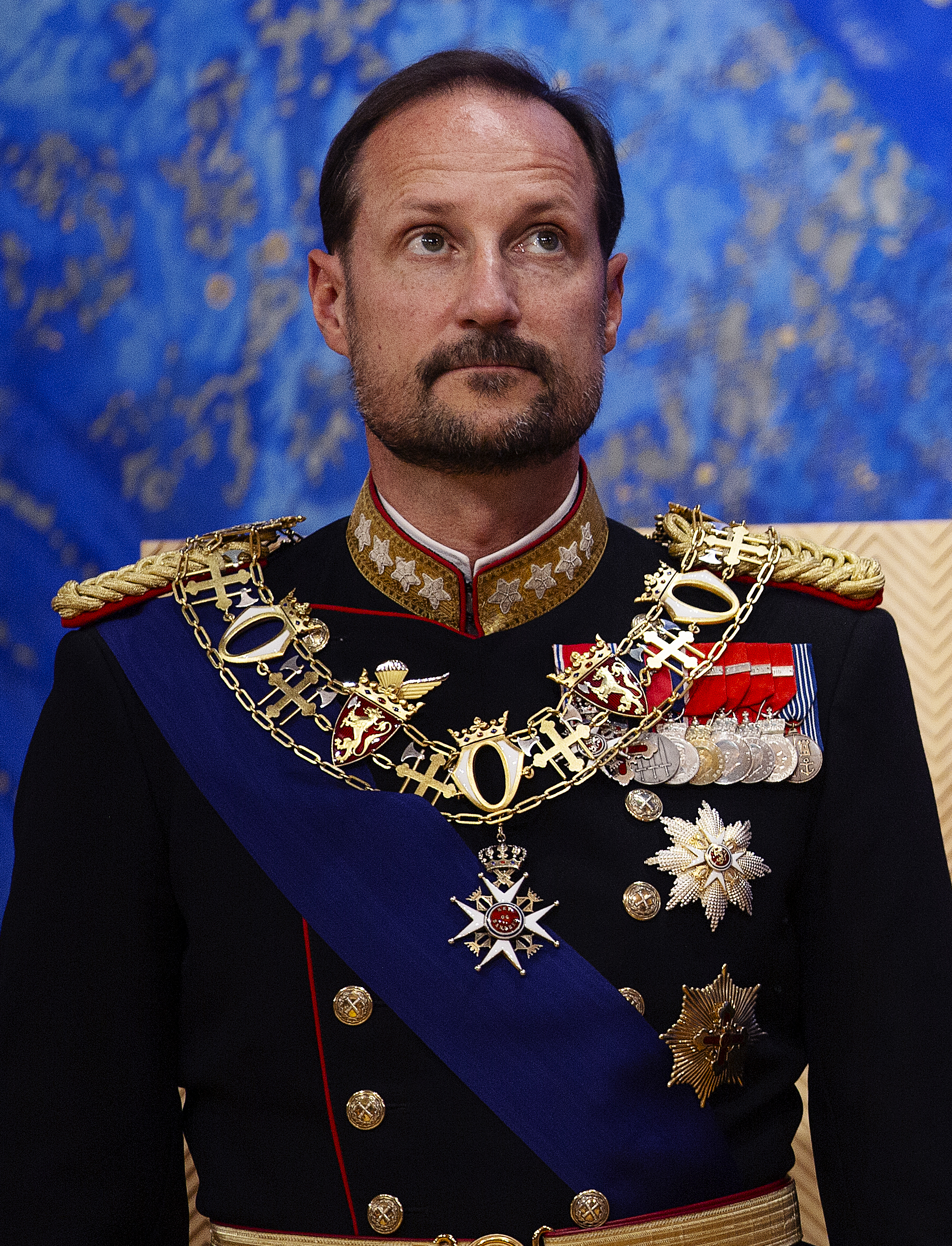
- Haakon VIII since 28 August 2026

Details
- Style: His Majesty
- Heir apparent: Crown Princess Ingrid Alexandra
- First monarch: Harald Fairhair
- Formed: c. 872; 1154 years ago
- Residence: Royal Palace, Oslo
- Website: The Norwegian Monarchy

The monarchy of Norway is the system used in Norway by which a hereditary monarch reigns as head of state under a constitutional monarchy with a parliamentary system. The Norwegian monarchy can trace its line back to the reign of Harald Fairhair and the previous petty kingdoms which were united to form Norway; it has been in unions with both Sweden and Denmark for long periods.

The present monarch is King Haakon VIII, who has reigned since 28 August 2026, succeeding his father, Harald V. The heir apparent is his firstborn daughter, Crown Princess Ingrid Alexandra, who undertakes various public ceremonial functions along with several other members of the royal family. Since the dissolution of the union between Norway and Sweden and the subsequent election of a Danish prince as King Haakon VII in 1905, the reigning royal house of Norway has been a branch of the House of Glücksburg branch of the House of Oldenburg; originally from modern-day Schleswig-Holstein in Germany, agnatically (through Prince Philip) the same royal house as the British (since the accession of Charles III), Danish and former Greek royal families.

Whilst the Constitution of Norway grants important executive powers to the king, these are almost always exercised by the Council of State in the name of the king (King's Council, or cabinet). Formally, the king appoints the government according to his own judgment, but parliamentary practice has been in place since 1884. Constitutional practice has replaced the meaning of the word King in most articles of the constitution from the king personally to the elected government. The powers vested in the monarch are significant but are treated only as reserve powers and as an important security part of the role of the monarchy.

The king does not, by convention, have direct participation in government. He ratifies laws and royal resolutions, receives and sends envoys from and to foreign countries, and hosts state visits. He has a more tangible influence as the symbol of national unity. The annual New Year's Eve speech is one occasion when the king traditionally raises negative issues. The king is also the supreme commander of the Norwegian Armed Forces and Grand Master of the Royal Norwegian Order of St. Olav and of the Royal Norwegian Order of Merit. The king has no official role in the Church of Norway, but is required by the Constitution to be a member.

== History ==
The position of King of Norway has been in continuous existence since the unification of Norway in 872. Although Norway has officially been a hereditary kingdom throughout that time, there have been several instances of elective succession: most recently, the people of Norway electorally confirmed the accession of Haakon VII to the position of king through the 1905 plebiscite. In recent years members of the Socialist Left party have proposed the abolition of the monarchy during each new session of parliament, though without any likelihood of success. This gives the Norwegian monarchy the unique status of being a popularly elected royal family and receiving regular formal confirmations of support from the Storting.

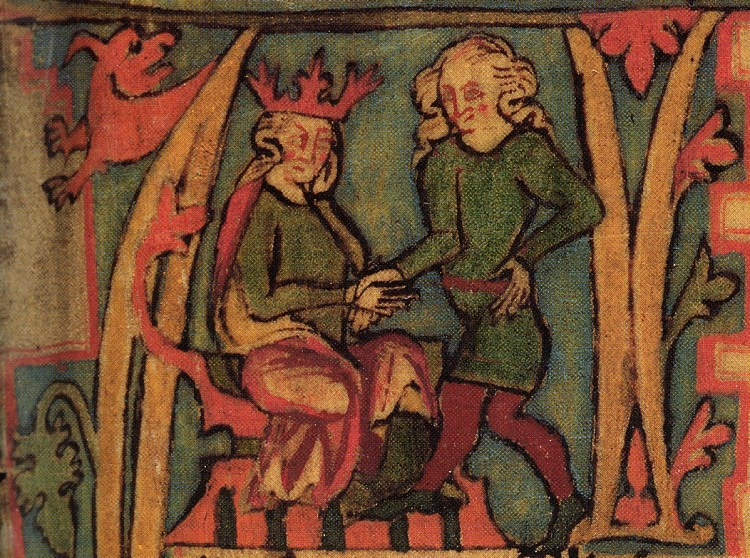
King Harald Fairhair receives Norway out of his father's hands in this illustration from the 14th-century Flateyjarbók.

=== Germanic kingdom ===
Prior to and in the early phase of the Viking Age Norway was divided into several smaller kingdoms. These are thought to have followed the same tradition as other Germanic monarchies of the time: the king was usually elected by the high-ranking farmers of the area and served mainly as a judge at popular assemblies, as a priest on the occasion of sacrifices, and as a military leader in time of war.

Harald Fairhair was the first king of Norway. The date of the first formation of a unified Norwegian kingdom is set as 872 AD when he defeated the last petty kings who resisted him at the Battle of Hafrsfjord; however, the consolidation of his power took many years. The boundaries of Fairhair's kingdom were not identical to those of present-day Norway, and upon his death, the kingship was shared among his sons. Some historians emphasise the actual monarchial control over the country and assert that Olaf II, alias Saint Olaf, who reigned from 1015 to 1028, was the first king to control the entire country. Olaf is generally held to have been the driving force behind Norway's final conversion to Christianity. Furthermore, he was in 1031 revered as Rex Perpetuus Norvegiae ("Eternal King of Norway"), and subsequently, the 1163 Succession Law stated that all kings after Olaf II's son, Magnus I, were not independent monarchs, but vassals holding Norway as a fief from Saint Olaf.

=== Middle Ages ===
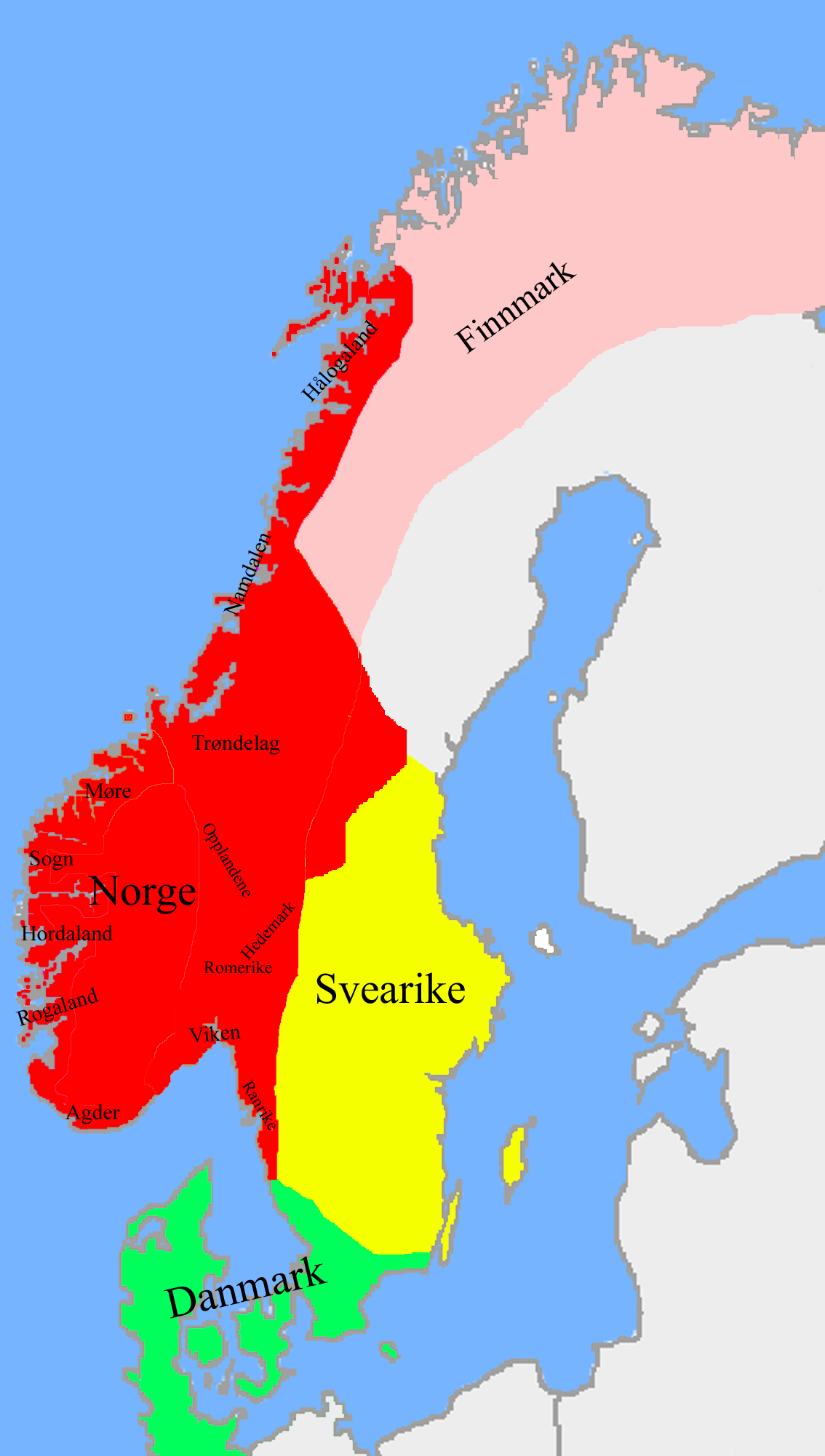
Mainland Norway during the reign of Saint Olav c. 1020 AD. The Finnmarken ("Marches of the Sami"), most of which paid tribute to the kings of Norway, are shown in pink.

In the 12th and 13th centuries the Norwegian kingdom was at its geographical and cultural peak. The kingdom included Norway (including the now Swedish provinces of Jemtland, Herjedalen, Særna, Idre and Båhuslen), Iceland, the Faroe Islands, Greenland, Shetland, Orkney and other smaller areas in the British Isles. The king had diplomatic relations with most of the European kingdoms and formed alliances with Scotland and Castile, among others. Large castles such as Haakon's Hall and cathedrals, the foremost being Nidaros Cathedral, were built.

In the tradition of Germanic monarchy the king had to be elected by a representative assembly of noblemen. Men eligible for election had to be of royal blood; but the eldest son of the previous king was not automatically chosen. During the civil war era the unclear succession laws and the practice of power-sharing between several kings simultaneously gave personal conflicts the potential to become full-blown wars. Over the centuries kings consolidated their power, and eventually a strict succession law made Norway a principally hereditary kingdom. In practice the king was elected by the Riksråd in a similar way to Denmark. He adhered to a håndfæstning and governed in the council of Norwegian noblemen according to existing laws.

After the death of Haakon VI of Norway in 1380, his son Olav IV of Norway succeeded to the thrones of both Norway and Denmark and was also elected King of Sweden. After his death at the age of 17 his mother Margrethe I united the three Scandinavian kingdoms in personal union under one crown, in the Kalmar Union. Olav's death extinguished the Norwegian male royal line; he was also the last Norwegian king to be born on Norwegian soil for the next 567 years.

The Black Death of 1349–1351 contributed to the decline of the Norwegian monarchy, as the noble families and the population in general were gravely affected. However, the most devastating factor for the nobility and the monarchy in Norway was the steep decline in income from their holdings. Many farms were deserted and rents and taxes suffered. This left the Norwegian monarchy weakened in manpower, noble support, defensibility and economic power.

=== Union with Denmark ===
The Kalmar Union was not only possible due to the complex history of the royal dynasties of Scandinavia but was also, among other things, a direct reaction to the expansive and aggressive policies of the Hanseatic League.

On 6 June 1523 Sweden left the union permanently with the new king Gustav Vasa, leaving Norway in an unequal union with a Danish king Frederick I already embarked on centralising the government of the union.

In the following centuries the Norwegian monarchs mostly resided abroad. This weakened the monarchical governing structures of Norway: the Riksråd, for example, was gradually undermined as the Norwegian nobles did not have the King's confidence to the same extent as their Danish counterparts. The King was also less able to govern according to Norwegian needs, as the distance meant he and his advisors had less knowledge of conditions in Norway.

Norway was one of few countries where the archdiocese was coterminous with the national territory. The church was an important factor in trying to maintain the separate Norwegian monarchy. In the 16th century the power struggle between the Norwegian nobles and the king culminated at the same time as the Protestant Reformation. This prompted a set of events in which the struggle against Danish dominance in Norway was coupled with the struggle against the Reformation. When both failed the effects were harsh. The Norwegian Catholic bishops were replaced with Danes and the Norwegian church was subdued and made wholly Danish. The Norwegian Riksråd was abolished in 1536, and increasingly more foreigners were appointed to important positions in Norway.

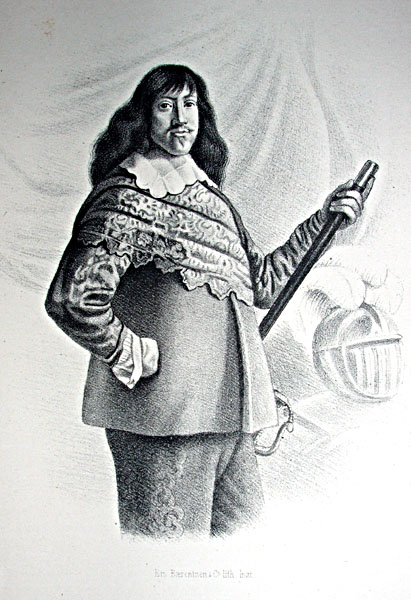
King Frederick III

The Danish nobles pushed the king to reduce Norway to a Danish province in order for them to gain more control in the election of future kings. However, the hereditary nature of the Norwegian monarchy meant that the King had to maintain the basic principle of Norway being a separate and extant kingdom. If the Danish nobles were to elect as king someone other than the next in line to the throne the Union would be dissolved. This gave the king the upper hand in the negotiations for the håndfesting. Potential heirs to Norway were present in both the royal dynasties of Sweden and Schleswig-Holstein, so if the King of Denmark did not assert his position as King of Norway they would.

During this time the Danish kings were more preoccupied with securing the traditionally Danish fringe territories, and therefore paid little attention to and made few attempts at maintaining Norwegian interests. As a result, Jemtland, Härjedalen, Båhuslän, Shetland and Orkney were lost to Sweden and Scotland. In addition all contact with Greenland ceased.

In 1661 Frederick III introduced absolute monarchy in Denmark and Norway and introduced new laws in both countries to that effect. Until then the law of Magnus the law-mender given in 1274 and 1276 had been the law of Norway. Christian IV's Norwegian law was in effect a translation into Danish of that older law. 1661 also marks the point when the last remnants of representational local government were removed and had to be rebuilt. However, that process started almost immediately when local men of means started putting pressure on local governors in order to gain or regain influence on local matters.

=== Emerging independence ===
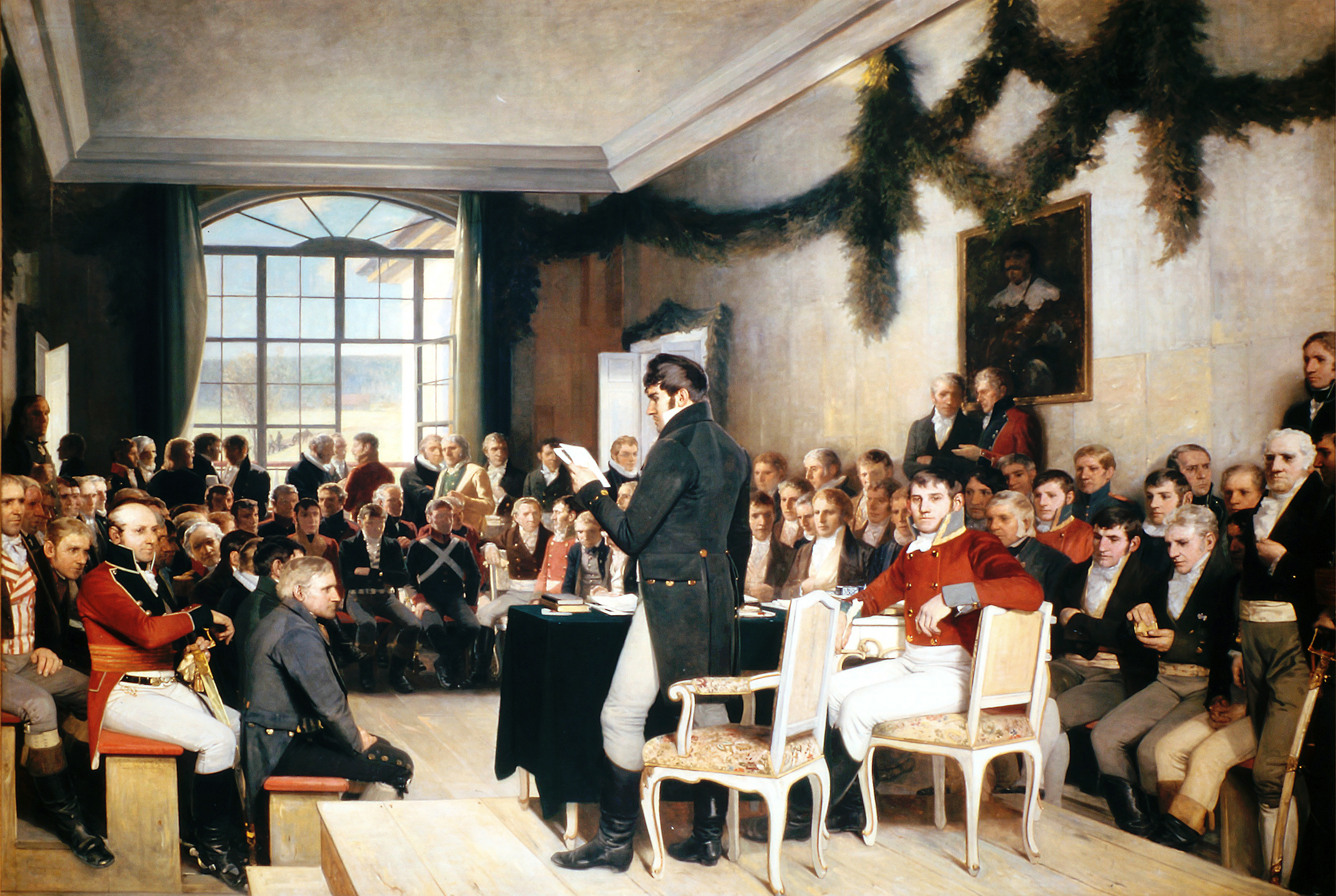
The Constituent Assembly at Eidsvoll in 1814.

During the Napoleonic Wars the King aligned Denmark–Norway with France. When Napoleon lost the war, the king was forced to cede Norway to the king of Sweden under the Treaty of Kiel in 1814. It was initially proposed that the Norwegian dependencies of Greenland, Iceland and the Faroes would remain with Norway, but that point was dropped during the negotiations, so they became Danish.

On hearing news of the treaty, the Prince of the Kingdom of Denmark-Norway, Christian Frederick, the resident viceroy in Norway, participated in founding a Norwegian independence movement. The independence movement was successful, partly due to clandestine support from the Danish Crown, but also because of the strong desire for independence in Norway. On 10 April, a national assembly met at Eidsvoll to decide on a constitution. Norway declared independence on 17 May 1814, electing Christian Frederick as King. A short war with Sweden later that year ended with the Convention of Moss. This led to the ousting of Christian Frederick, and the Norwegian Storting electing Charles XIII of Sweden as King of Norway, creating the union between Sweden and Norway. In turn the king recognised the Norwegian constitution, which was only changed to facilitate the union.

The end result was that the Norwegian monarchy became a constitutional monarchy. In this new union the King was much more a King of Norway than under the previous Danish system. The only area of policy not in the hands of the Norwegians was foreign policy.

Norway had been brought along into the new developments of the world as they arrived in Denmark. However, with the break the Norwegians were able to forge a more progressive political development than was the case in Denmark. Denmark introduced a constitutional monarchy 35 years after Norway. Parliamentarism was introduced in Norway 17 years before Denmark and 33 years before Sweden. The union with Denmark also had its adverse effects on the monarchy: among other things it resulted in the Crown of Norway losing territory which today amounts to 2,322,755 km^{2} (although most of this was uninhabited areas of Greenland). Very little royal activity had been relocated to Norway; the country thus lacks the monumental palaces of the period which can be seen in Copenhagen and other parts of Denmark.

=== Union with Sweden ===
Royal Standard of Norway during the Union with Sweden

The Treaty of Kiel stipulated that Norway was to be ceded by the king of Denmark–Norway to the king of Sweden. This was however rejected in Norway, where calls for self-determination were already mounting. A Norwegian constituent assembly was called, and a liberal constitution was adopted on 17 May 1814. A short war ensued, ending in a new agreement between the Norwegian parliament and the Swedish king.

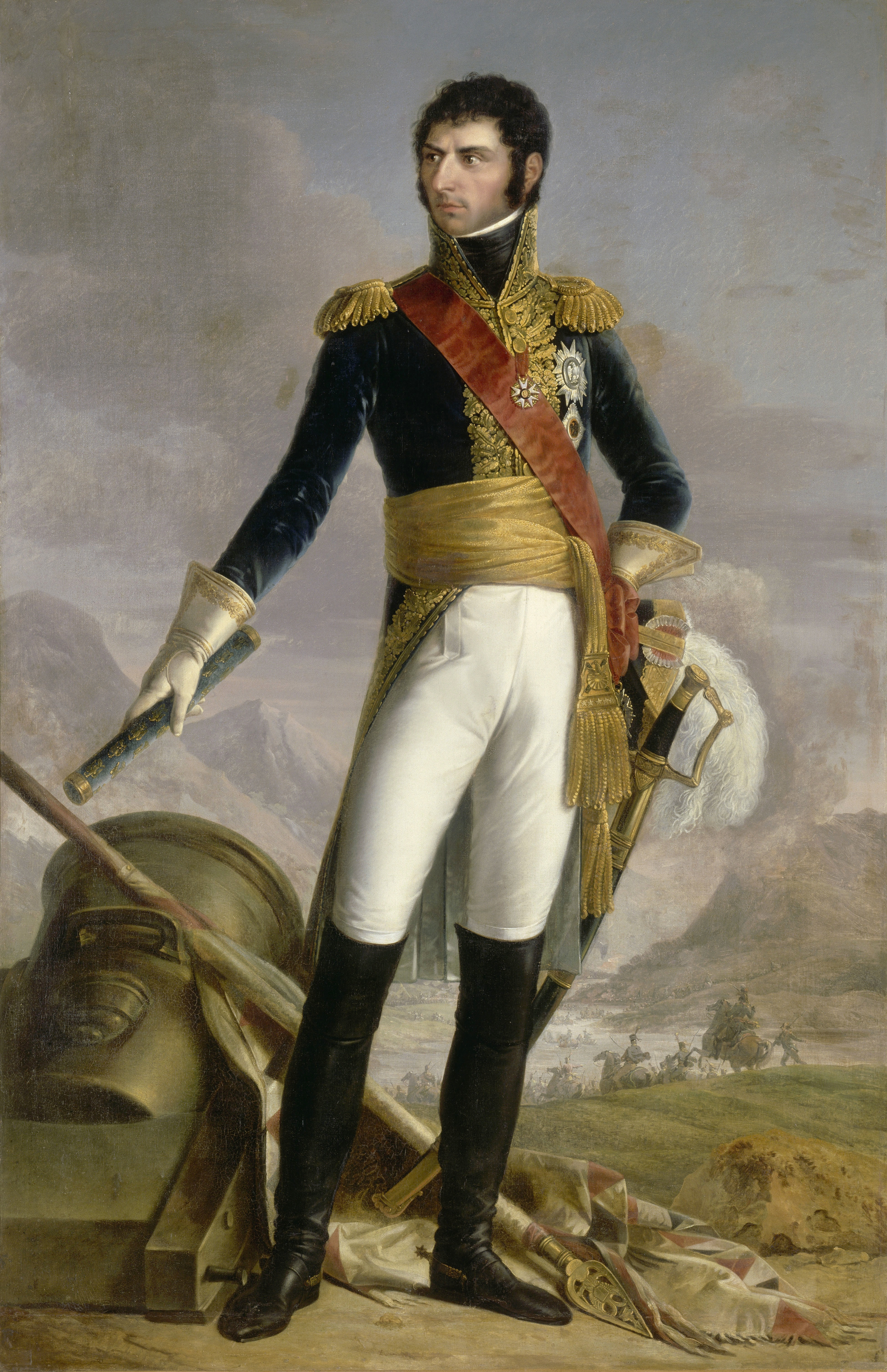
Jean Baptiste Bernadotte [a.k.a. King Charles XIV John], Marshal of France, King of Sweden (1818). Joseph Nicolas Jouy, after François Kinson. As Crown Prince, Jean Baptiste Bernadotte was primarily responsible for establishing the union.

The Convention of Moss was from a Norwegian point of view a significant improvement over the terms dictated to Denmark-Norway at the treaty of Kiel. Notably, Norway was no longer to be treated as a Swedish conquest but rather as an equal party in a personal union of two independent states. Both the principle and substance of the Norwegian Constitution were preserved, with only such amendments as were required to allow for the union with Sweden. Norway retained its own parliament and separate institutions, except for the common king and foreign service.

The Norwegian Storting would propose Norwegian laws without interference from Sweden, to be approved by the common King in his capacity as King of Norway. The King would occasionally enact laws unfavourable to Sweden. As the Norwegian movement towards full independence gained momentum, the King approved the building of forts and naval vessels intended to defend Norway against a Swedish invasion.

The union was nevertheless marked by the Norwegians' constant and growing discontent with being in a union of any kind. The Storting would propose laws to reduce the king's power or to assert Norwegian independence. These would most often be vetoed by the king, but as he only had the power to veto the same law twice, it would eventually be passed. The constitution of 1814 already specified that Norway would have a separate flag, and the present design was introduced in 1821. The flags of both kingdoms were defaced with the union mark in 1844 to denote their equal status within the union. Despite royal objections, this was removed from the Norwegian flag in 1898. In 1837 local self-government in certain areas of policy was introduced in rural areas as well as towns. A Parliamentary system was introduced in 1884.

The Royal House of Bernadotte tried hard to be a Norwegian royal house as well as a Swedish one. The Royal Palace in Oslo was built during this period. There were separate coronations in Trondheim, as stipulated in the Constitution. The royal princes even had a hunting lodge built in Norway so that they could spend more private time there. King Oscar II spoke and wrote Norwegian fluently.

=== Full independence ===
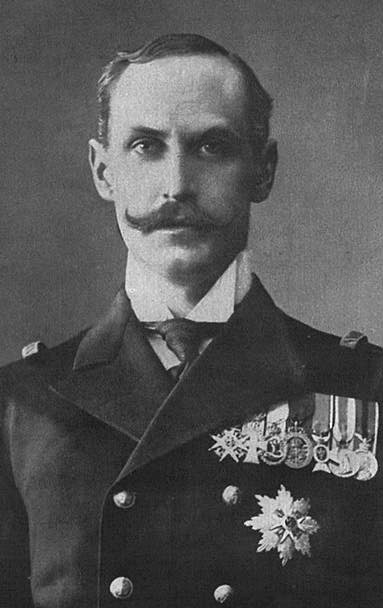
King Haakon VII early during his reign.

In 1905 a series of disputes between parliament and the King culminated with the matter of separate Norwegian consuls to foreign countries. Norway had grown into one of the world's leading shipping nations, but Sweden retained control of both the diplomatic and consulate corps. Although businessmen needed assistance abroad, the Swedes had little insight into Norwegian shipping, and consulates were not even established in several important shipping cities. The demand for separate Norwegian consuls was seen as very important by the Norwegian parliament and society. The Storting proposed a law establishing a separate Norwegian consulate corps. King Oscar II refused to ratify the law and subsequently the Norwegian cabinet resigned. The king was unable to form any other government that had the support of parliament, and so it was deemed on 7 June that he had failed to function as King of Norway.

In a plebiscite of the Norwegian people on 13 August, there were an overwhelming 368,208 votes (99.95%) in favor of dissolution of the Union, against 184 (0.05%) opposed, with 85% of Norwegian men voting. No women voted, as universal suffrage was not granted until 1913; however Norwegian feminists collected more than 200,000 signatures in favor of dissolution.

During the summer a Norwegian delegation had already approached the 33-year-old Prince Carl of Denmark, the second son of the Crown Prince Frederik of Denmark. The Norwegian parliament had considered other candidates but ultimately chose Prince Carl, partly because he already had a son to continue the line of succession, but more significantly because he was descended from independent Norwegian kings and Carl was also married to Maud of Wales, the daughter of King Edward VII. By bringing in a king with British royal ties, it was hoped that Norway could court Britain's support.

Prince Carl impressed the delegation in many ways, not least because of his sensitivity to the liberal and democratic movements that had led to Norway's independence. Though the Norwegian constitution stipulated that the Storting could choose a new king if the throne were vacant, Carl was aware that many Norwegians – including leading politicians and high-ranking military officers – favored a republican form of government. Attempts to persuade the prince to accept the throne on the basis of Parliament's choice failed; Carl insisted that he would accept the crown only if the Norwegian people expressed their will for monarchy by referendum and if the parliament then elected him king.

On 12 and 13 November, in the second constitutional plebiscite in three months, Norwegian voters decided by a nearly 79% majority (259,563 to 69,264) to keep the monarchy rather than establish a republic. The parliament, by an overwhelming majority, then offered Carl a clear mandate to the Norwegian throne on 18 November. The prince accepted the same evening, choosing the name Haakon, a traditional name used by Norwegian kings. The last king with that name had been Haakon VI, who died in the year 1380.

Thus the new king became Haakon VII, King of Norway. His two-year-old son Alexander, the heir apparent, was renamed Olav and became Crown Prince Olav. The new royal family arrived in the capital Kristiania (later Oslo) on 25 November. Haakon VII was sworn in as king of Norway on 27 November.

=== A new monarchy ===
Royal Standard of Norway since 1905

The early years of the new Norwegian monarchy were marked by a shortage of funds. The Norwegian state was poor and funds were needed elsewhere than in the upkeep of a large court. In that sense it was a stroke of good fortune that Prince Carl had set as a condition for accepting the throne that he would not be forced to keep a large court. However, the royal travels and the upkeep of the royal residences, after the initial refurbishment in 1905, were to some extent neglected. One example of the negative financial situation is that Prince Carl had been promised a royal yacht when he accepted the throne, but this was not fulfilled until 1947.

Under the 1814 constitution, while Haakon VII was nominally vested with executive power, he was not responsible for exercising it. In keeping with his democratic inclinations, Haakon largely limited himself to a ceremonial and representative role, while fully accepting the principles of parliamentary democracy. One important incident in the early years of the new monarchy was in 1928 when the king appointed the first government headed by the Norwegian Labour Party. At the time, the Labour Party was quite radical, and even had the abolition of monarchy as part of their programme. It was the custom for the king to rely on the advice of the previous prime minister in deciding whom to give the assignment as new prime minister. In this case, the previous conservative prime minister was opposed to giving power to Labour, and advised the appointment of someone else. However, the king adhered to the established practice of parliamentarism and decided to appoint Christopher Hornsrud as the first Labour prime minister. The Labour Party later dropped the abolition of monarchy from their programme.

During the German occupation of World War II, the king was an important symbol of national unity and resistance. His steadfast opposition to the German demands of surrender was important for the fighting spirit of the Norwegian population. When Germany demanded that Haakon VII appoint a government headed by Vidkun Quisling, head of the fascist Nasjonal Samling, Haakon refused. Haakon told his ministers that neither the people nor the Storting had confidence in Quisling, and was so strongly opposed to appointing a Quisling-led government that he would abdicate before doing so. This is one of the few known instances since the end of the union with Sweden that a Norwegian king directly intervened in the country's politics. The constitutional powers granted to the king in the Norwegian monarchial system made his position very important and enabled the government in exile to continue its work with the utmost legitimacy.

After the war, the Norwegian royal house succeeded in maintaining a balance between regality and approachability. After 52 years as crown prince, Olav V ascended the throne upon his father's death in 1957. Places was deemed the people's king and the spontaneous show of mourning from the population upon his death in 1991 demonstrated the high standing he had among the Norwegian people. Even republicans were among the masses lighting candles in front of the Palace.

In later years the marriages of the then crown prince Harald in 1968, and of Crown Prince Haakon in 2001 sparked considerable controversy, but the lasting effect on the popularity of the monarchy has been minimal. Although decreased from its level of above 90 percent after the war, support for the monarchy in 2004 seemed to remain stable, around and mostly above 70 percent. In an opinion poll in 2012, 93% of respondents agreed that the monarch was doing a good job for the country.

== Constitutional and official role ==
Although the 1814 constitution grants important executive powers to the King, these are almost always exercised by the Council of State in the name of the King.

Contemporary Norwegian constitutional practice has replaced the meaning of the word "king" in most articles from the meaning the King-in-person; apart from those dealing with the monarchy specifically, as opposed to those dealing with the apparatus of government and affairs of state at large; to the cabinet of the Prime Minister (also known as the King-in-Council when chaired by the King), which is accountable to the Storting, and thus ultimately to the electorate.

=== Immunity ===
Article 5 stated: The King's person is sacred; he cannot be censured or accused. The responsibility rests with his Council.

This article applies to the king personally. The king has legal sovereign immunity, though his status as sacred was dissolved on 8 May 2018.

Article 37 states: The Royal Princes and Princesses shall not personally be answerable to anyone other than the King, or whomever he decrees to sit in judgment on them.

This means that the Princes and Princesses also have immunity on the discretion of the king. He could decide to let them be judged by the regular courts or he could decide to judge them himself. This has never been tested in practice.

=== Council of State ===
The Council of State consists of the king, prime minister and other members, all of whom are appointed by the king on the advice of prime minister. The Council of State is the Government of Norway and is chaired by the King. It meets under the king's chairmanship at least once a week usually on Fridays. The king also orders the holding of extraordinary sessions of the council of state in situations that require urgent actions that cannot wait for the next scheduled meeting. Parliamentarism has been in place since 1884 and entails that the cabinet must not have the parliament against it, and that the appointment by the king is a formality. In practice, the monarch will ask the leader of a parliamentary block that has a majority in the Storting to form a government. The king relies on the advice of the previous prime minister and the president of the Storting in this question. The last time the king appointed a new prime minister contrary to the advice of the previous was in 1928 when he appointed the first Labour government.

Article 12 states: The King himself chooses a Council from among Norwegian citizens who are entitled to vote. [...] The King apportions the business among the Members of the Council of State, as he deems appropriate.

Article 30 states: [...] Everyone who has a seat in the Council of State has the duty frankly to express his opinion, to which the King is bound to listen. But it rests with the King to make a decision according to his own judgment. [...]

=== Veto of laws ===
The King has to sign all laws in order for them to become valid. He can veto any law. However, if two separate Stortings approve the law, it becomes valid even without the King's consent. The Crown has not vetoed any law since the dissolution of the union with Sweden.

Article 78 states: If the King assents to the Bill, he appends his signature, whereby it becomes law.

If he does not assent to it, he returns it to the Storting with a statement that he does not for the time being find it expedient to sanction it. In that case the Bill must not again be submitted to the King by the Storting then assembled. [...]

=== Church of Norway ===
Until 2012 the constitutional head of the Church of Norway, also known as the Evangelical Lutheran Church of Norway, was the King. The Church of Norway professes the Lutheran branch of Christianity, and is a member of the Porvoo Communion.

Since 2012 the Church has been self-governing, although it remains the established state church, of which 63.7% of the population are members. In accordance with the constitution, the Norwegian King as head of state must be a member of the Evangelical Lutheran Church of Norway.

=== Pardoning criminals ===
Article 20 states: The King shall have the right in the Council of State to pardon criminals after sentence has been passed.

A pardon is the forgiveness of a crime and the penalty associated with it. It may be given if new information on the crime or criminal has come to light after sentencing has begun. A pardon may entail a complete or partial withdrawal of punishment. The practical execution of this right has been delegated to the Ministry of Justice which may dismiss an application for a pardon. The formal approval of a pardon has to be done by the King in Council. In 2004 a total of 51 applications for pardon were approved and 274 were denied.

In impeachment proceedings, the King cannot pardon a defendant without the consent of the Storting.

=== Appointing senior officials ===
Article 21 states: The King shall choose and appoint, after consultation with his Council of State, all senior civil, and military officials. The appointment is made by the Monarch after having been advised by the council of state and having received its consent.

=== Dismissing the government ===
Article 22 states: The Prime Minister and the other Members of the Council of State, together with the State Secretaries, may be dismissed by the King without any prior court judgment, after he has heard the opinion of the Council of State on the subject.

=== Chivalric orders ===
Article 23 states: The King may bestow orders upon whomever he pleases, as a reward for distinguished services[...]

Norway has two chivalric orders: the Royal Norwegian Order of St. Olav and the Royal Norwegian Order of Merit. In addition the King awards several other distinguished medals for a wide range of accomplishments.

=== War ===
Article 25 states: The King is Commander-in-Chief of the land and naval forces of the Realm. The King is also Commander-in-Chief of the Norwegian Air Force: but it is not explicitly mentioned because there was no Air Force in 1814.

Article 26 states: The King has the right to call up troops, to engage in hostilities in defence of the Realm and to make peace, to conclude and denounce conventions, to send and to receive diplomatic envoys.

The King is treated by the armed forces as their highest commander, but there is, beyond legal fiction, no doubt that the complete control of the armed forces is actually held by the elected government of the day. The Kings of Norway have traditionally received an extensive military training and to some extent pursued a career within the armed forces before acceding to the throne. During World War II the King took a more active role in the decision-making and while the government still had the last word the King's advice was given much weight. On one occasion during the invasion the King was given an ultimatum by the Germans demanding Norway's surrender. King Haakon VII told the government he would abdicate if they decided to accept. In 1944 Crown Prince Olav was appointed Chief of Defence based on his military leadership abilities.

== Coronation ==
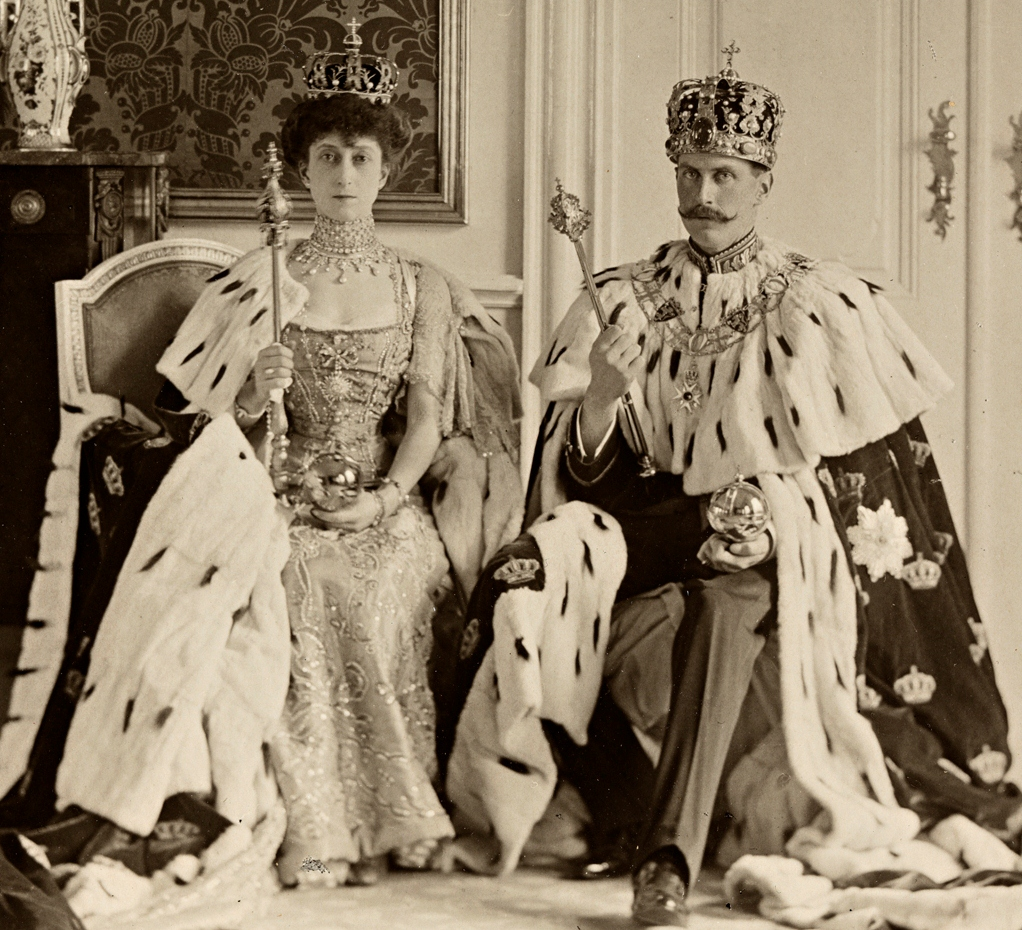
King Haakon VII and Queen Maud in full regalia in 1906.

From before recorded Norwegian history the monarch would be installed by acclamation, a ceremony held on the thing where the king swore to uphold the laws of the land and the assembled chieftains swore allegiance to him. The first coronation in Norway and in all Scandinavia took place in Bergen in 1163 or 1164. For a long time both ceremonies were used in Norway. That way the king was invested with powers both from the noblemen and from the church. The coronations also symbolised that the king would hold the kingdom in fief to St. Olav the eternal king of Norway. The last acclamation took place on Akershus Castle in 1648. The last medieval coronation in Norway took place 29 July 1514. During the age of absolute monarchy (1660–1814), Norway's kings were crowned in Copenhagen, using the Throne Chair. Today the king still goes through a ceremony similar to the acclamation when he takes the oath of allegiance to the Constitution in the Storting. The Norwegian Constitution of 1814 determined that any Norwegian coronations from that time onward were to take place in Nidaros Cathedral in Trondheim. This re-established the relationship to the sacred king's burial church. The constitutional article about the coronation was annulled in 1908. When King Olav V ascended the throne in 1957, he still wanted to receive the blessing of the church for his reign, so the Benediction of the King was introduced. The benediction is a much simpler ceremony, but it still takes place in Nidaros Cathedral and with the Royal Regalia at the high altar. The regalia is currently located in the old Archbishop's Palace in Trondheim. King Harald V and Queen Sonja also received the benediction in 1991.

The Constitution requires the new King to immediately take an oath before the Storting (or, if the Storting is not in session, before the Council of State and again before the Storting once it is in session). The oath is as follows: "I promise and swear that I will govern the Kingdom of Norway in accordance with its Constitution and Laws; so help me God, the Almighty and Omniscient."

== Succession ==
The order of succession to the Norwegian throne has followed absolute primogeniture since 1990, as is described in article 6 in the Constitution of Norway. Only people descended from the reigning monarch and their siblings are entitled to succeed to the throne. If the line of succession comes to an end then the Storting may elect a new king or queen.

== Finances ==
The King, Queen and Crown Princess are exempt from paying any taxes and their personal finances are not revealed to the public. Other members of the royal family have lost that privilege upon marriage. It is believed that only the King has a personal fortune of a notable size.

The royal farms generate some revenue, but this is always re-invested in the farms themselves.

In the Norwegian state budget of 2010 the sum of 142.5 million Norwegian kroner was allocated to the Royal Household. 16.5 million was also given to the monarchs as appanage. 20.9 million was in addition allocated to rehabilitation of royal property. In 2010, the Royal Household of Norway claimed that King Harald V's fortune was close to a 100 million Norwegian kroner. 500 million Norwegian kroner was in the late 1990s allocated to the extensive refurbishments of the royal residences that have been taking place and are still under way. The restoration of the Royal Palace in Oslo went far beyond budget because the structural state of the palace was much worse than expected. However, the large expense was criticised in the media.

== Residences ==
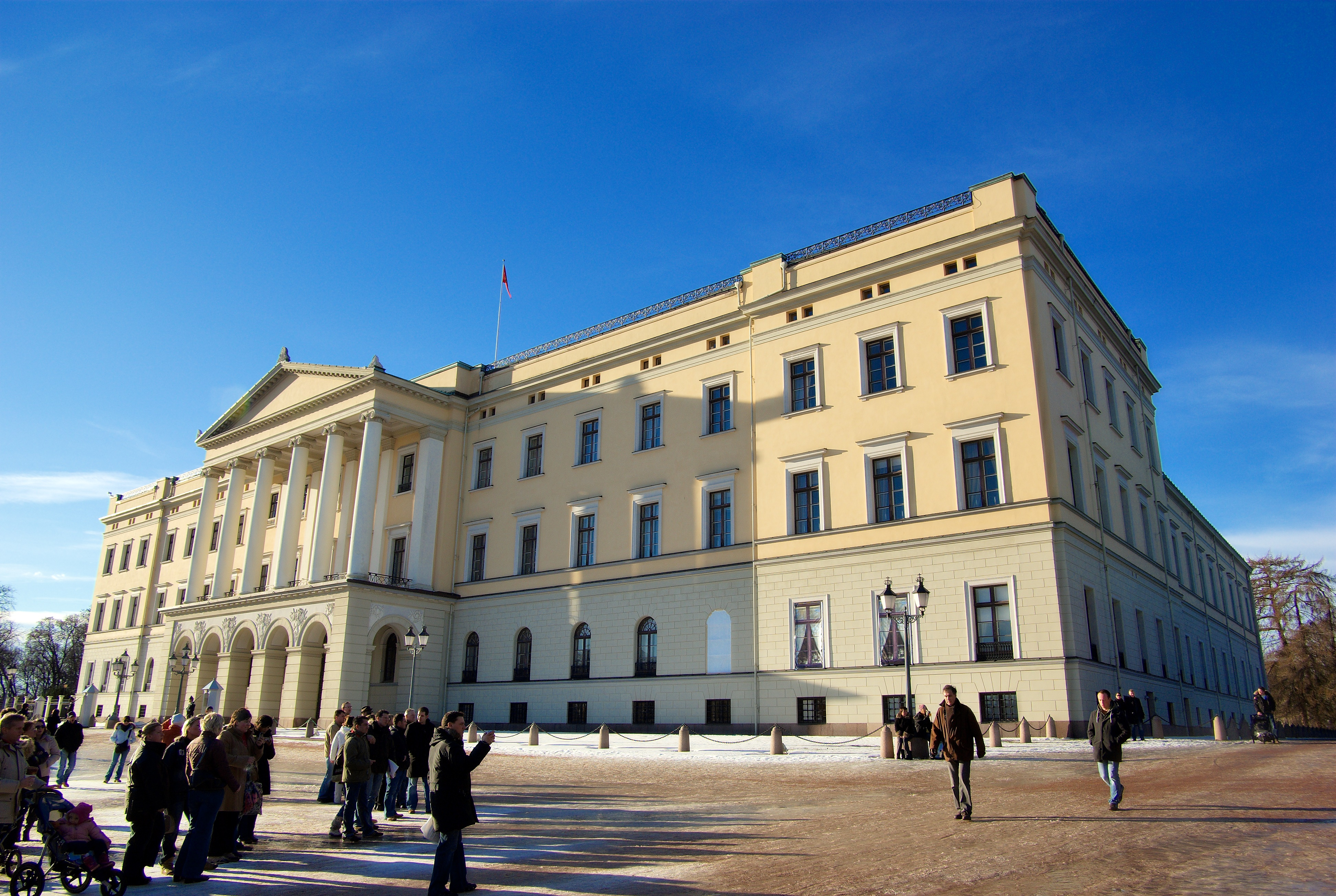
Main façade of the Royal Palace in Oslo

The royal family and the monarch have several residences at their disposal throughout the country. All of the official residences are partially open to the public.

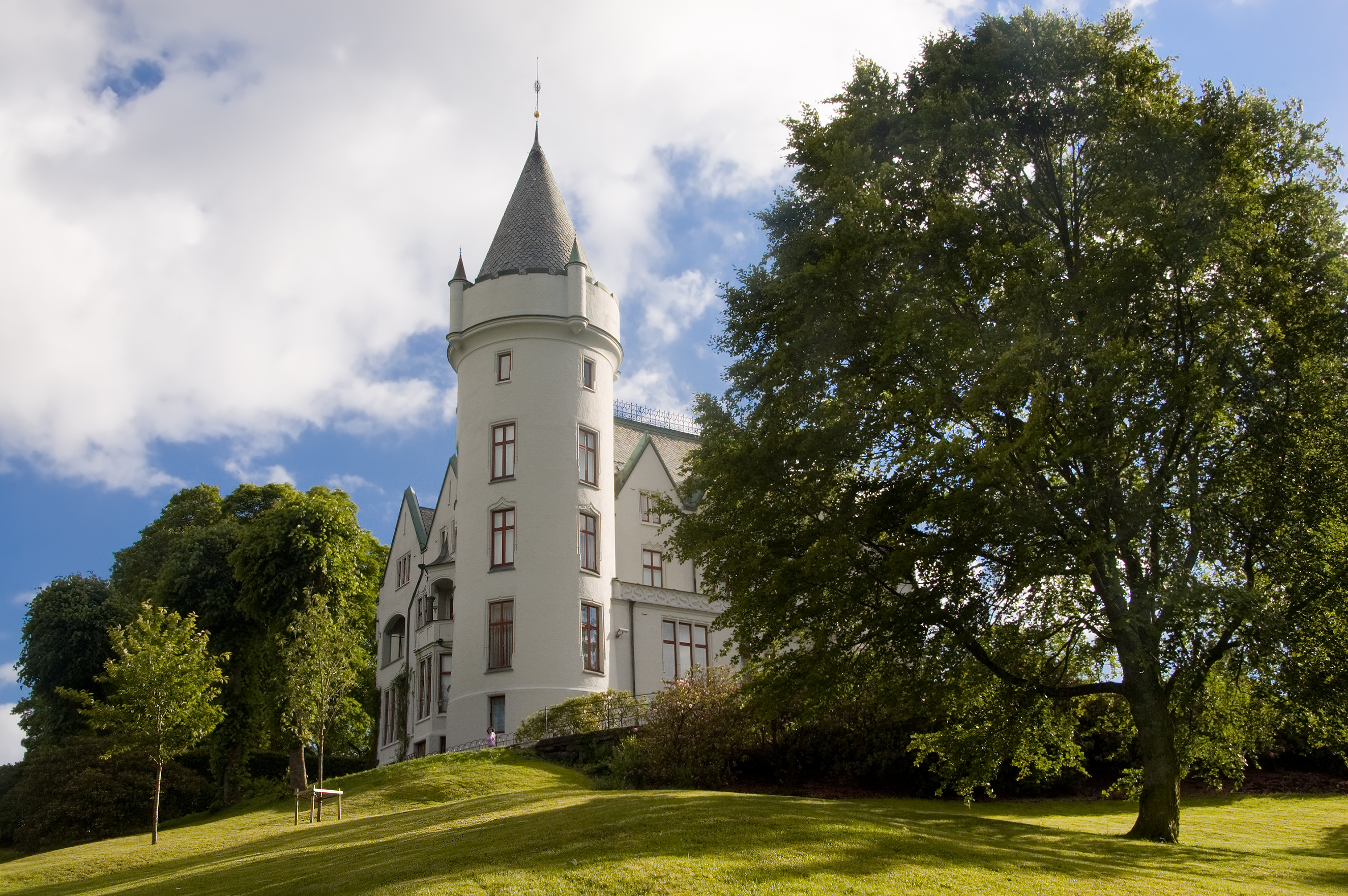
Gamlehaugen

=== Current residences ===
==== Royal Palace ====
The Royal Palace in Oslo functions as the main official residence of the monarch. Built in the first half of the 19th century as the Norwegian residence of Norwegian and Swedish king Charles III (Carl Johan, Charles XIV of Sweden, reigned 1818–1844), it serves as the official residence of the present Norwegian Monarch.

==== Gamlehaugen ====
Gamlehaugen is a mansion and estate which functions as the monarch's residences in Bergen. Originally the home of Prime Minister Christian Michelsen, the estate became the royal family's residence in 1927.

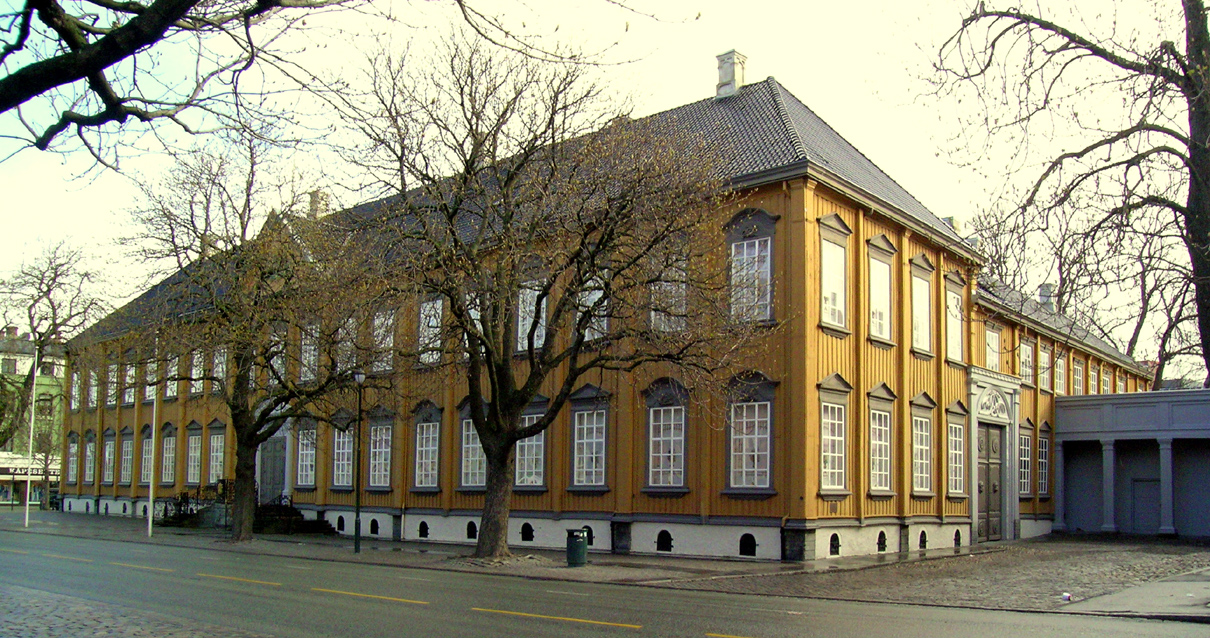
Stiftsgården in Trondheim

==== Stiftsgården ====
Stiftsgården in Trondheim is a large wooden townhouse which has been used by the royal family since the early 1800s. The building has been the setting for the main festivities during coronations, benedictions and weddings which traditionally have taken place in the Nidaros Cathedral.

==== Ledaal ====
Ledaal is a large manor house in Stavanger. The manor originally belonged to the influential Kielland family but has been the property of Stavanger Museum since 1936 and became a royal residence in 1949.

==== Other residences ====
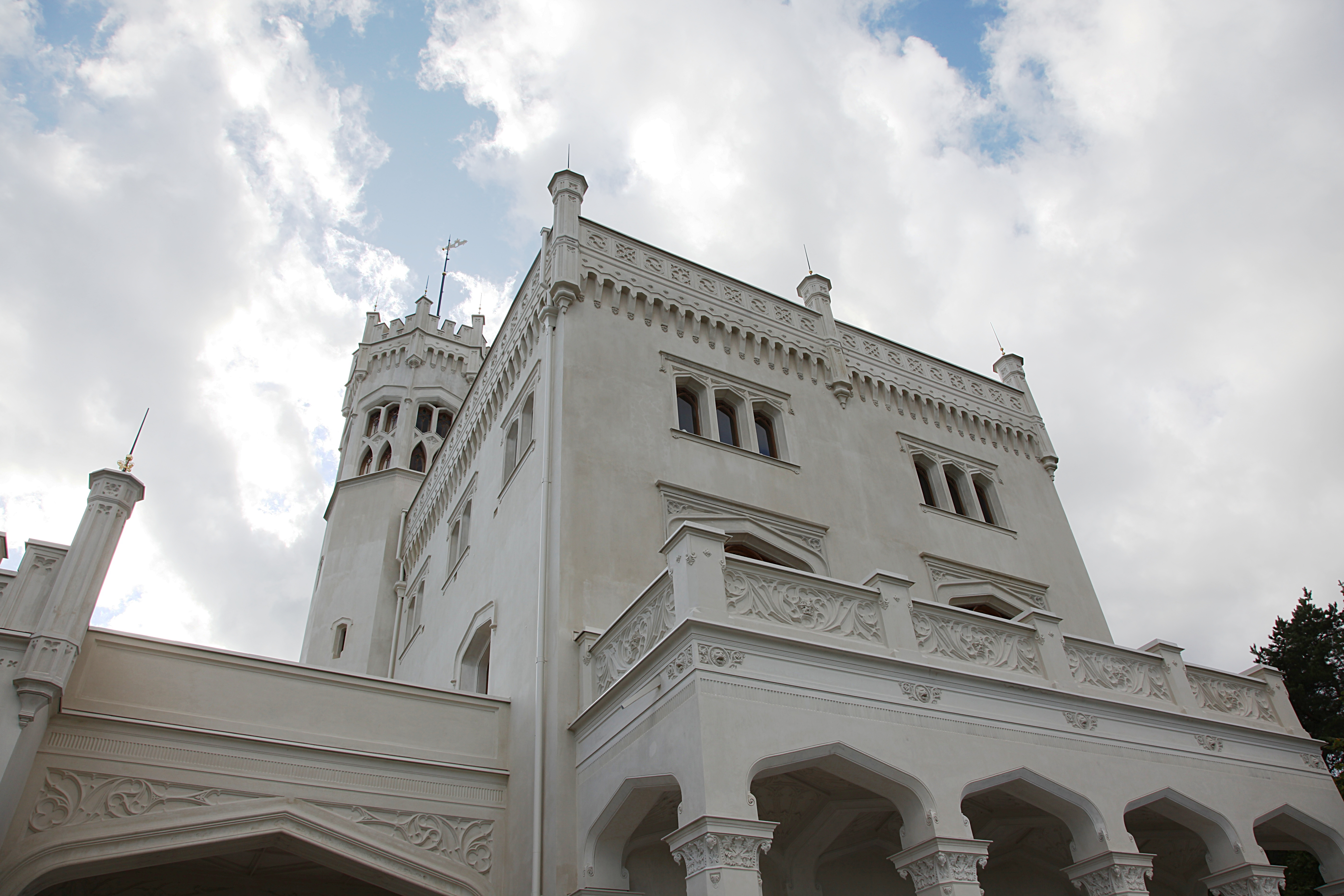
Oscarshall palace

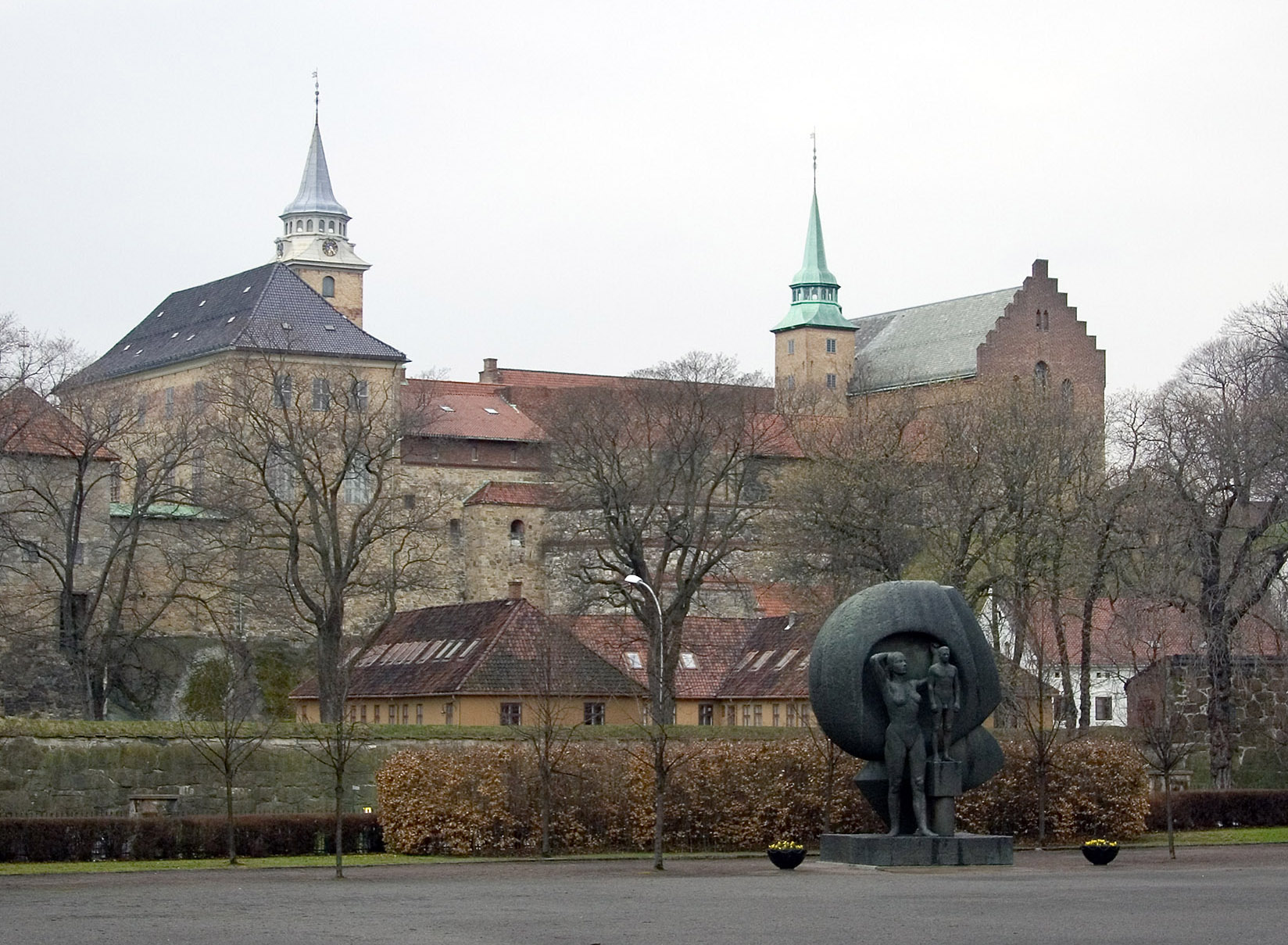
Akershus Castle and palace was often used as a royal residence by the Dano-Norwegian kings

Bygdøy Royal Estate, the official summer residence, is situated in Oslo. Bygdøy has been under extensive restoration and has therefore not been used regularly since the accession of King Harald V in 1991. The restoration was finalized in 2007 and has been frequently used by the royal family ever since. The Royal Lodge or Kongsseteren is located in Holmenkollen, and used by the Royal Family as a residence for Christmas and Holmenkollen Ski Festival each year. Oscarshall palace, a maison de plaisance, also situated in Oslo, but seldom used.

The crown princely couple resides at Skaugum Manor in Asker municipality outside of Oslo, while the three princesses of Norway live on estates in Oslo, Fredrikstad and Rio de Janeiro, Brazil. Both Skaugum and Bygdøy Royal Estate are working farms producing grain, milk and meat; the profits are re-invested in the farms themselves. In 2004 the King transferred management of the farming activities on Bygdøy to the Norwegian Museum of Cultural History.

The King owns a royal yacht bearing the name HNoMY Norge. Crewed and maintained by the Royal Norwegian Navy, it is used both for official and private travels in Norway and abroad. The Norwegian Railway Museum maintains a royal train carriage.

The royal family also possess several other holiday homes of a private nature.

=== Former and historic residences ===
- Paléet. A magnificent townhouse which was as a royal residence between 1801 and 1849 prior to the construction of the Royal Palace.
- Akershus Fortress. The castle in Oslo was converted into a palace by King Christian IV during the union between Denmark and Norway
- Bergenhus Fortress. Originally, the medieval castle was a residential palace while Sverresborg provided defence for the city.
- Tønsberg Fortress. The castle in Tønsberg was used as a residence by several kings, including Håkon V Magnusson who was the last king of Norway prior to the establishment of the Kalmar Union.
- Various Kongsgård estates were used by the Norwegian kings during the Viking Age and early Middle Ages. This includes significant estates like Alrekstad, Avaldsnes Kongsgård estate and the Oslo Kongsgård estate.

== Royal coat of arms ==
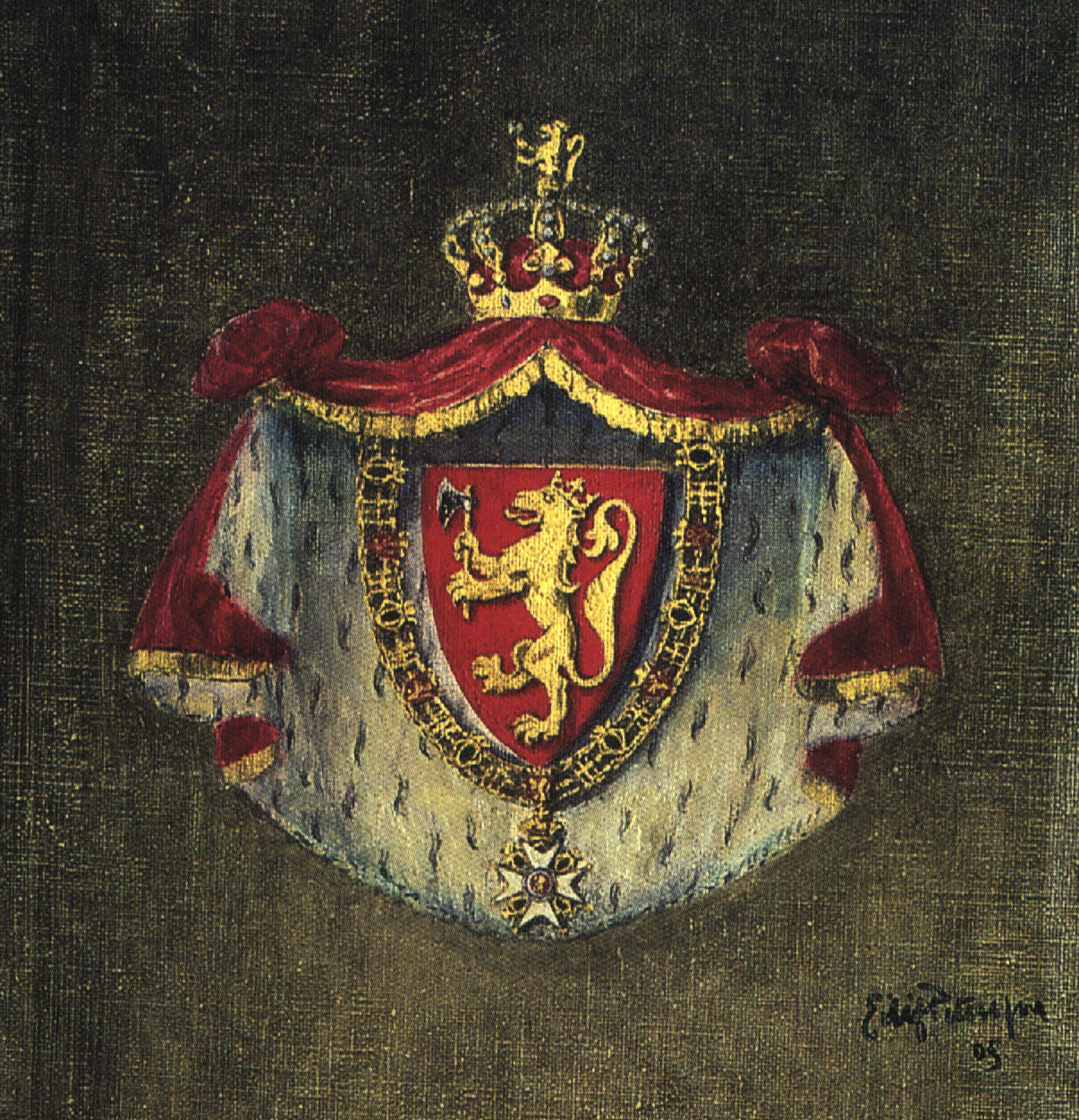
Painting of the Royal coat of arms of 1905 by Eilif Peterssen.

The Coat of arms of Norway is one of the oldest in Europe and serves both as the coat of arms of the nation and of the Royal House. This is in keeping with its origin as the coat of arms of the kings of Norway during the Middle Ages.

Håkon the Old (1217–1263) used a shield with a lion. The earliest preserved reference to the colour of the arms is the King's Saga written down in 1220.

In 1280 King Eirik Magnusson added the crown and silver axe to the lion. The axe is the martyr axe of St. Olav, the weapon used to kill him in the battle of Stiklestad in 1030.

The specific rendering of the Norwegian arms has changed through the years, following changing heraldic fashions. In the late Middle Ages, the axe handle gradually grew longer and came to resemble a halberd. The handle was usually curved in order to fit the shape of shield preferred at the time, and also to match the shape of coins. The halberd was officially discarded and the shorter axe reintroduced by royal decree in 1844, when an authorized rendering was instituted for the first time. In 1905 the official design for royal and government arms was again changed, this time reverting to the medieval pattern, with a triangular shield and a more upright lion.

The coat of arms of the royal house as well as the Royal Standard uses the lion design from 1905. The earliest preserved depiction of the Royal Standard is on the seal of Duchess Ingebjørg from 1318. The rendering used as the official coat of arms of Norway is slightly different and was last approved by the king 20 May 1992.

When used as the Royal coat of arms the shield features the insignias of the Royal Norwegian Order of St. Olav around it and is framed by a royal ermine robe, surmounted by the crown of Norway.

The Royal coat of arms is not used frequently. Instead, the king's monogram is extensively used, for instance in military insignia and on coins.

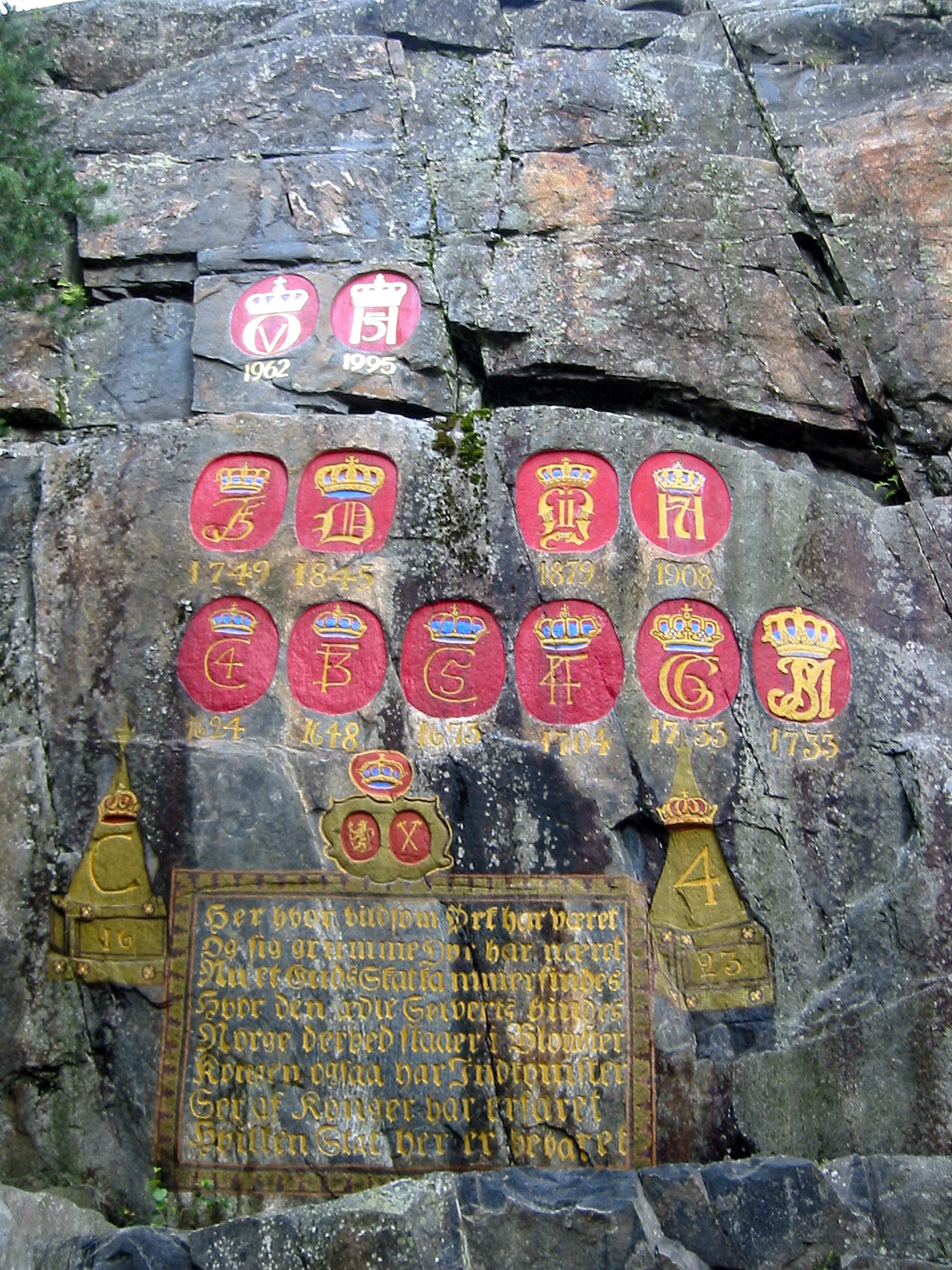
Royal monograms carved in a mountain side to mark royal visits to Kongsberg since 1623.

== See also ==
- List of Norwegian monarchs
- Norwegian royal family
- Royal coronations in Norway
- House of Glücksburg
- Politics of Norway
- Lèse majesté in Norway
- Abel Prize
- Republicanism in Norway
