= Tomas Rudin =

Swedish politician (born 1965)

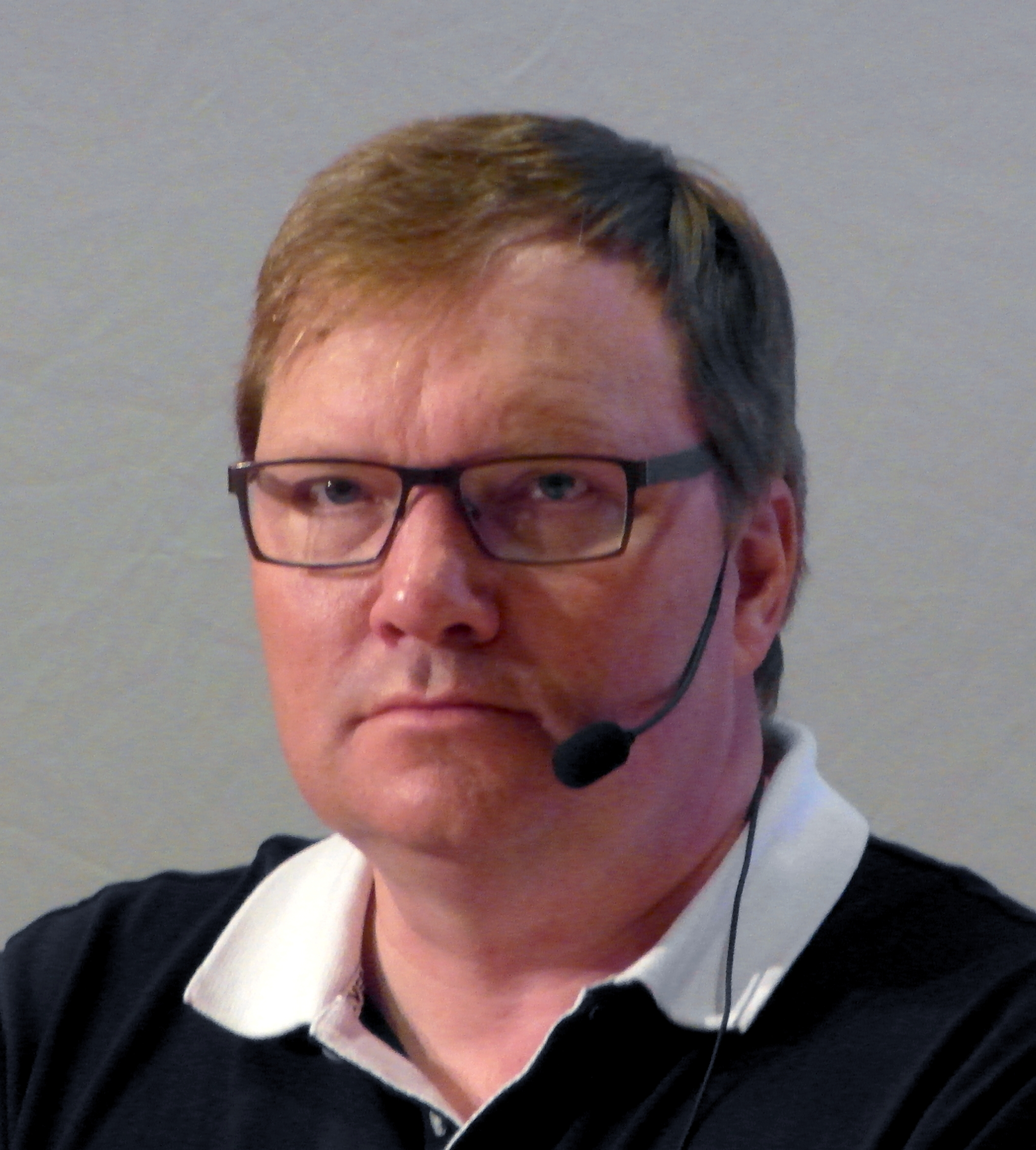
- Rudin in 2013
- Born: 1965 (age 59–60)
- Occupation: Politician

Tomas Rudin (born 1965) is a Swedish Social Democratic politician in the opposition in the Stockholm district. Between 2002 and 2010, Rudin was the secretary of the Stockholm Arbetarkommun, the municipal unit of Sveriges Socialdemokratiska Arbetareparti (Social Democratic Labour Party of Sweden). He was a member of the County Council in the Stockholm County Council. He also held the post of vice chairman of the board at Sveriges Radio.

In February 2014, Rudin was charged with shoplifting after taking a bottle of whisky without the intention of paying for it from a Systembolaget store in Farsta. He confessed and took sick-leave from his assignments and intended to seek help for his alcohol problems.
