= Norwegian Crown Prince's Coronet =

Coronet belonging to the Crown Prince of Norway

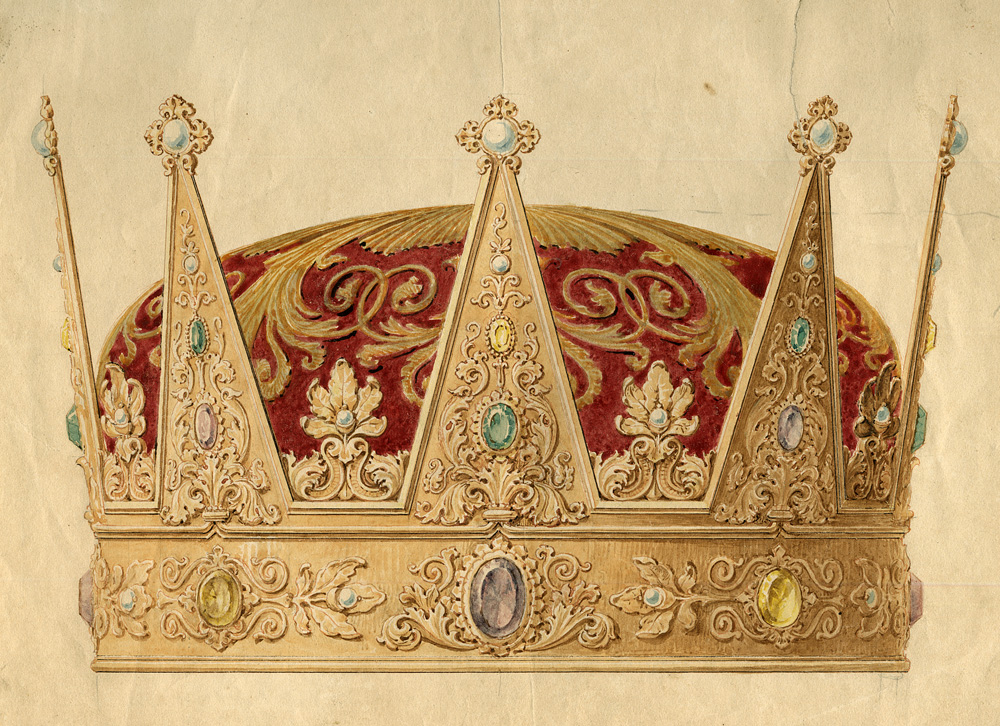
Painting of the coronet by Johannes Flintoe

The Crown Prince's Coronet is one of the Norwegian royal regalia.

The coronet was made in 1846 to a design by Johannes Flintoe, based on a crown dating from the Middle Ages. It was commissioned from the goldsmith Herman Colbjørnsen Øyset.

It was originally made for Crown Prince Carl, the future King Charles XV of Sweden. It was intended to be worn by Carl at the coronation of his parents, Oscar I and Josephine, but the ceremony never took place. It is the only piece of Norway's coronation regalia to have been made entirely in Norway, and it has never been worn.

The coronet is of the open type and is decorated with spikes. It weighs slightly more than 1 kg (2.2 lb) and is set with a green peridot, freshwater pearls, and an amethyst.

== See also ==
- Regalia of Norway
