= Crown of Norway =

Crown of the King of Norway

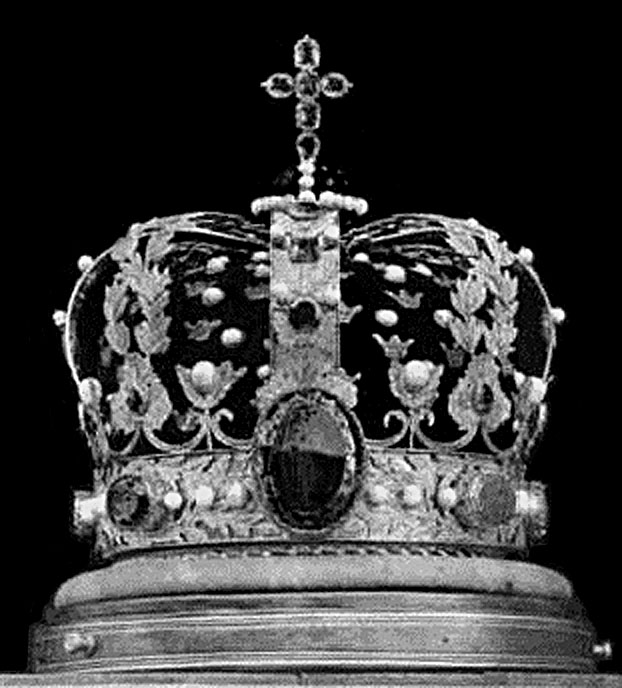
- King's Crown of Norway

Heraldic depictions

Details
- Country: Norway
- Made: 1818
- Arches: 8

The Crown of Norway is the crown of the King of Norway and was made in Stockholm in 1818 by goldsmith Olof Wihlborg. The crown is a corona clausa (closed model) consisting of a ring carrying eight hoops made of gold and surmounted by a monde of blue enamel and an amethyst cross on top of it. The crown is decorated with many pearls and gemstones including amethysts, chrysoprases, a topaz and an alexandrite. Its front is adorned with a huge green tourmaline, a gift of the Brazilian consul in Stockholm to King Charles III Johan. Its splendid colours and its richly elaborated ornaments make the crown typical of the Empire period. Although the goldsmith work was carried out by Olof Wihlborg, it is not known who designed the crown.

The Crown has a height of 24.5 cm, a diameter of 18.5 cm by 20.7 cm and a weight of 1500 grams.

The Crown has been used at four coronations and has had a prominent place at two benedictions. It has also been placed on the coffin of the deceased monarch since King Carl Johan's death in 1844.

The Royal Regalia of Norway is a collective term for three crowns, two orb and sceptres, the sword of state, the anointment horn, and a marshal's baton. When Carl III Johan of Norway (Charles XIV John of Sweden) came to the throne in 1818, it was clear he would be crowned in Trondheim as prescribed by the Norwegian Constitution. None of the medieval Norwegian crowns or other regalia had survived, so the King himself ordered and paid for the items. The coronation of King Haakon VII and Queen Maud in 1906 was the last to be held before the coronation requirement was removed from the Constitution. However, both the King's Crown and the Queen's Crown were placed on the altar during the Service of Consecration and Blessing for King Harald V and Queen Sonja in 1991.

The Regalia are kept in Nidaros Cathedral and are on display there.

== In heraldry ==
The Heraldic Crown of Norway

The official crown of Norway has its official heraldic rendition. This design has been changed over the years and is most commonly recognised sitting atop the coat of arms of Norway. However, many sections of government and especially the military are permitted to use the Crown of Norway on their shields. The use of the crown is heavily regulated and must always be displayed at the top of any page or other display.

The demi-lion on top of the crown was used by Norwegian governmental authorities from 1905, but was often omitted from about the year 1920, and officially omitted in the Royal Decree on the "arms of the realm" (Norwegian: riksvåpenet) from March 19, 1937. The demi-lion was omitted from the Royal Coat of Arms of Norway when it was redesigned for Harald V.

== See also ==
- Regalia of Norway

== External links and sources ==
- Official home page for the crown jewels, page on the Crown
- Home page of the Norwegian Royal Regalia
- Nidaros Cathedral | The Crown Jewels
- Royal House of Norway | The Regalia
