= Johan Fredrik Kjellén =

Swedish politician

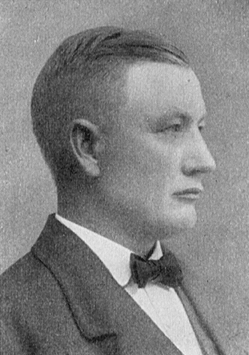
Image of Johan Fredrik Kjellén

Johan Fredrik Kjellén (1881–1959) was a Swedish politician. He was a member of the Centre Party.
