= Château de Compiègne =

Royal château built for Louis XV

Coordinates: 49°25′09″N 2°49′52″E

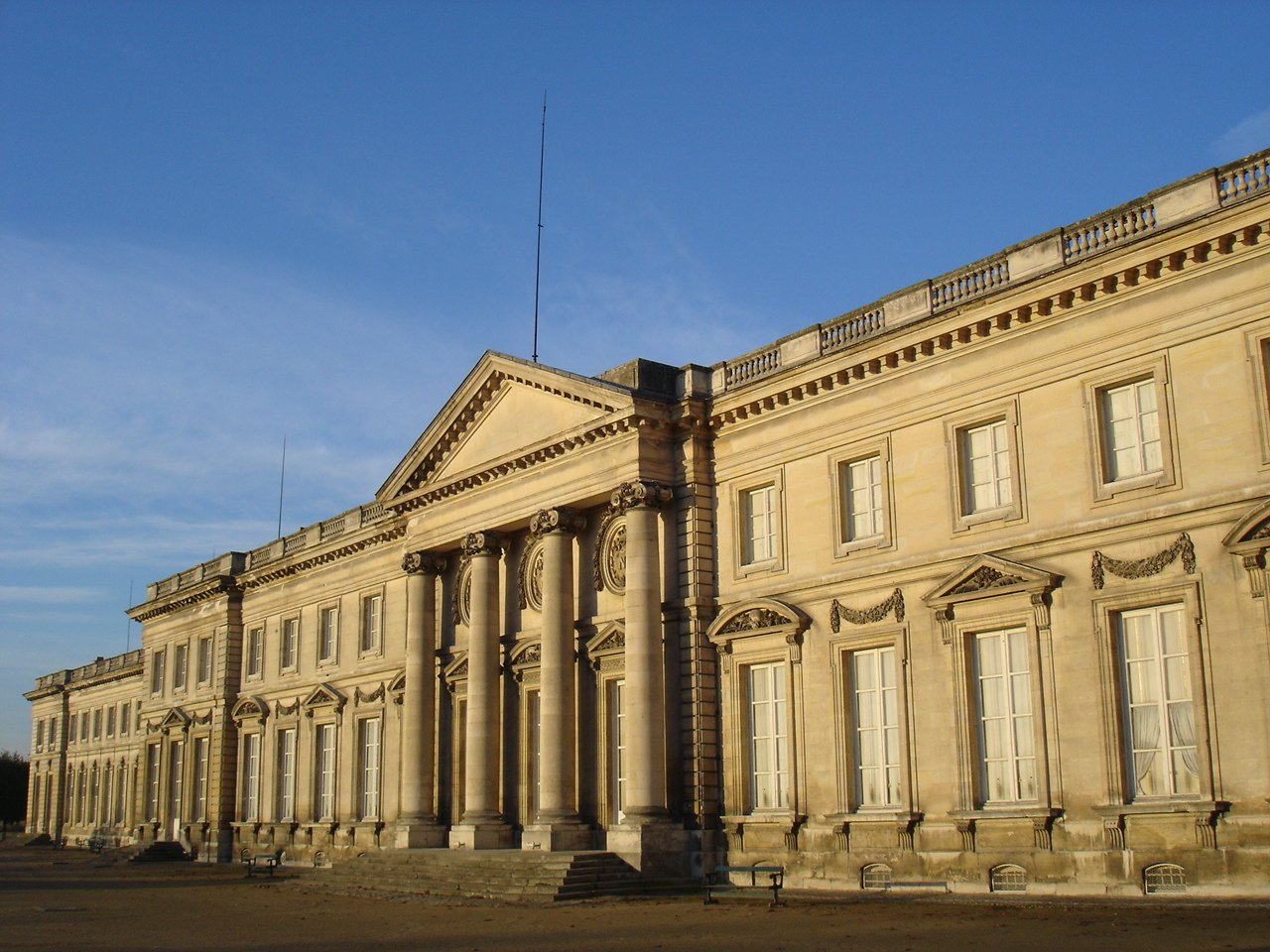
The Château de Compiègne seen from the garden

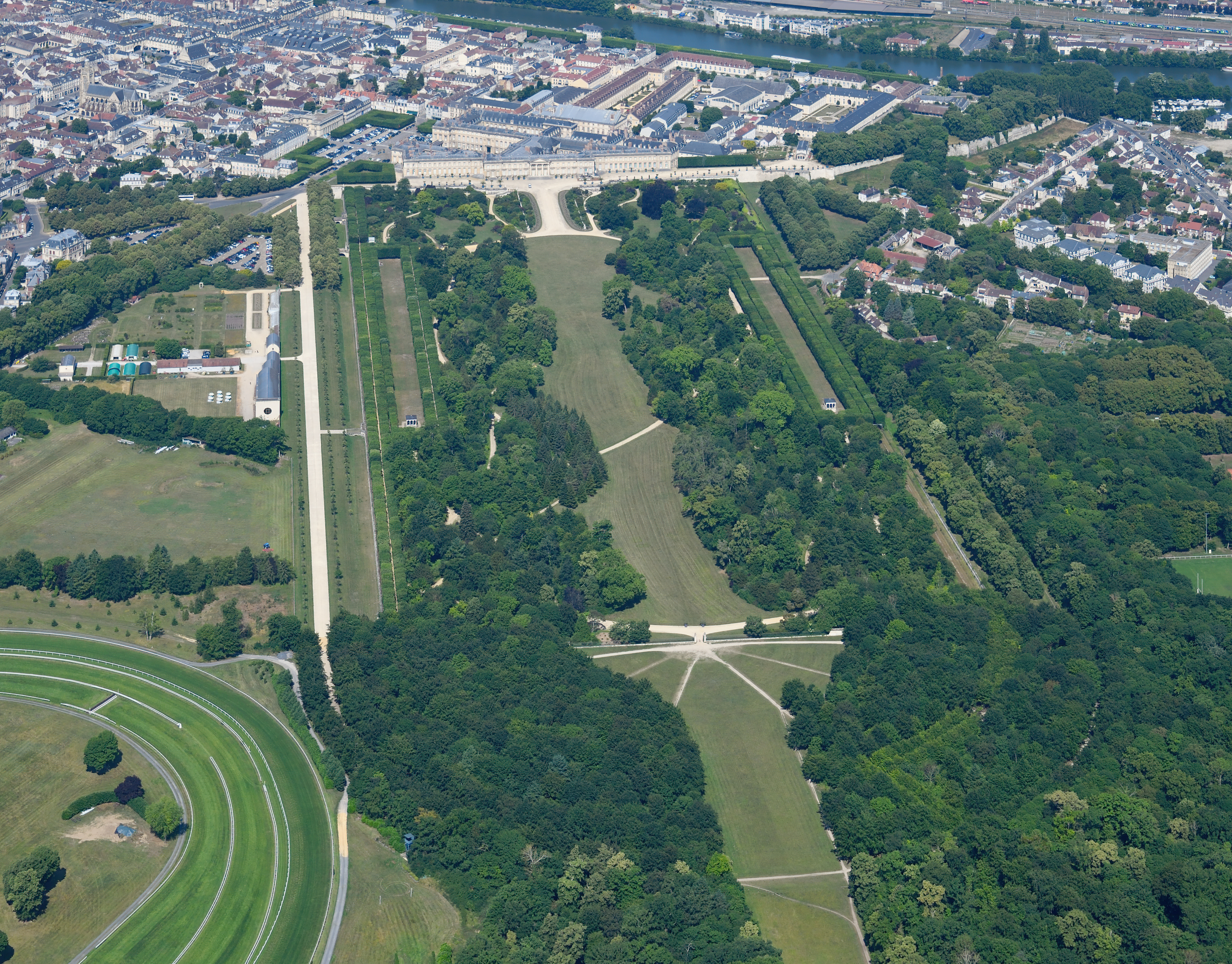
Aerial image of Château de Compiègne and its park

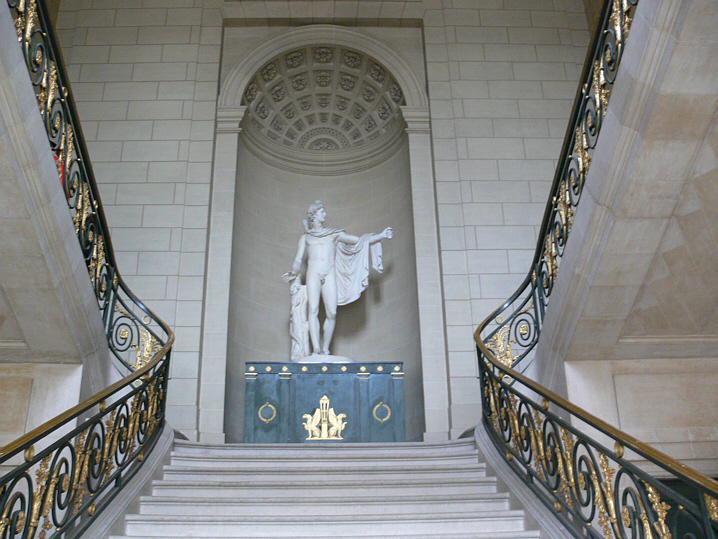
Main staircase at the château

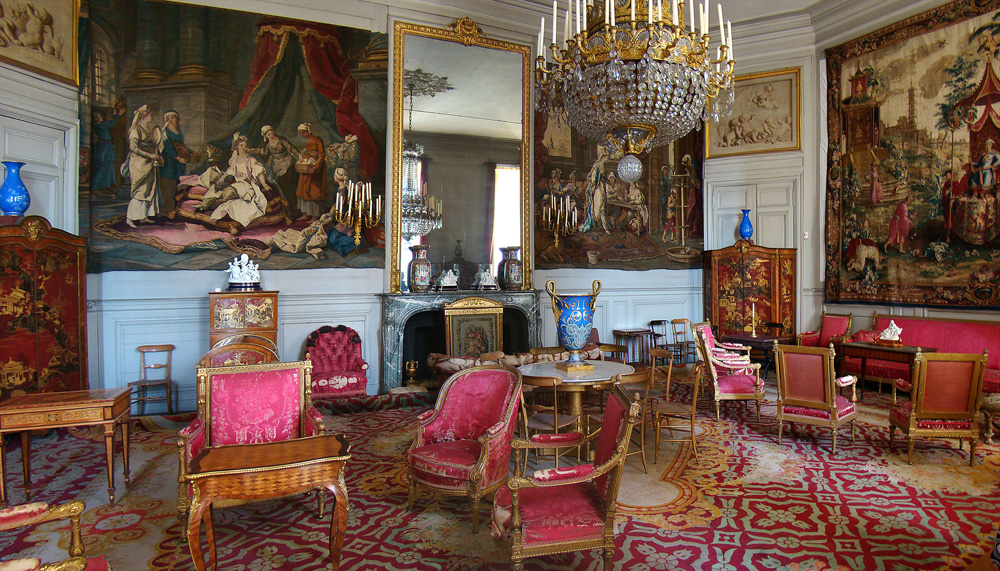
Music lounge

The Château de Compiègne is a French château, a former royal residence built for Louis XV and later restored by Napoleon. Compiègne was one of three seats of royal government, the others being Versailles and Fontainebleau. It is located in Compiègne in the Oise department and is open to the public.

== History ==
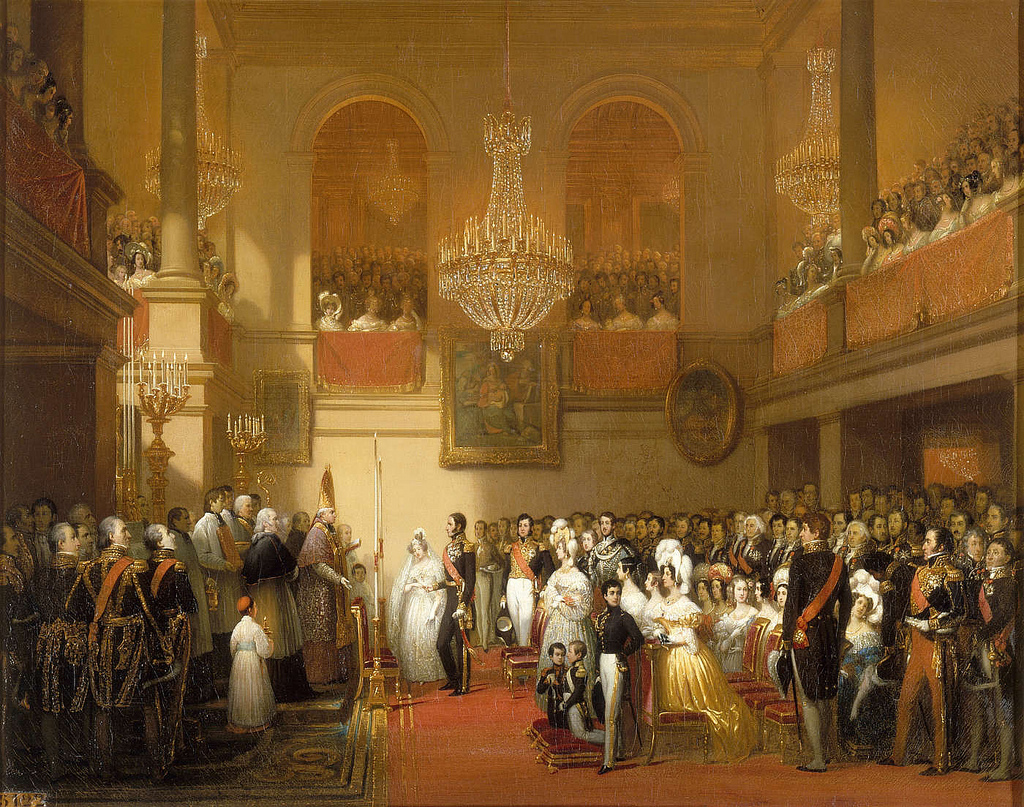
The Wedding of Leopold I of Belgium and Louise of Orléans by Joseph-Désiré Court, 1837

Even before the château was constructed, Compiègne was the preferred summer residence for French monarchs, primarily for hunting given its proximity to the Forest of Compiègne.

The first royal residence was built in 1374 for Charles V, and a long procession of successors both visited it and modified it. Louis XIV resided in Compiègne some 75 times. Louis XV was perhaps even more favorably impressed; the Comte de Chevergny described his infatuation:

Hunting was his main passion... and Compiègne, with its immense forest, with its endless avenues amongst the trees, with its stretches down which you could ride all day and never come to the end, was the ideal place to indulge that passion.

In 1750, the prominent architect Ange-Jacques Gabriel proposed a thorough renovation of the château. Work began in 1751 and was finished in 1788 by Gabriel's student Le Dreux de La Châtre. The ancient town ramparts dictated the château's triangular plan; the resultant building covers about 5 acres (20,000 m^{2}). It is neoclassical in style, with simplicity and clarity governing both its external and interior features.

During the French Revolution, the château passed into the jurisdiction of the Minister for the Interior. In 1795 all furniture was sold and its works of art were sent to the Muséum Central; it was essentially gutted.

=== 19th-century ===
Napoleon visited in 1799 and again in 1803. In 1804 the château became an imperial domain and in 1807, he ordered it to be made habitable again. Louis-Martin Berthault, Charles Percier and Pierre François Léonard Fontaine, decorators Dubois and Pierre-Joseph Redouté, and cabinetmakers François-Honoré-Georges Jacob-Desmalter and Marcion restored the château. Its layout was altered, a ballroom added, and the garden was replanted and linked directly to the forest.

The result is an example of Empire style (1808–1810), though some traces of the earlier décor survive. The writer Auguste Luchet remarked that "Compiègne speaks of Napoleon as Versailles does of Louis XIV". In 1832 the wedding of Leopold I of Belgium and Louise of Orléans, the daughter of the French king Louis Philippe I, took place at Compiègne. From 1856 on, Napoleon III and Eugénie made it their autumn residence, and redecorated some rooms in the Second Empire style.

=== Museums ===
Today's visitors can find three distinct museums within the château: the apartments themselves; the Museum of the Second Empire; and the National Car and Tourism Museum (Le Musée de la Voiture), founded in 1927, with a collection of carriages, bicycles, and automobiles.
