= Coronation Chair of Denmark =

Throne used by Danish monarchs since 1671

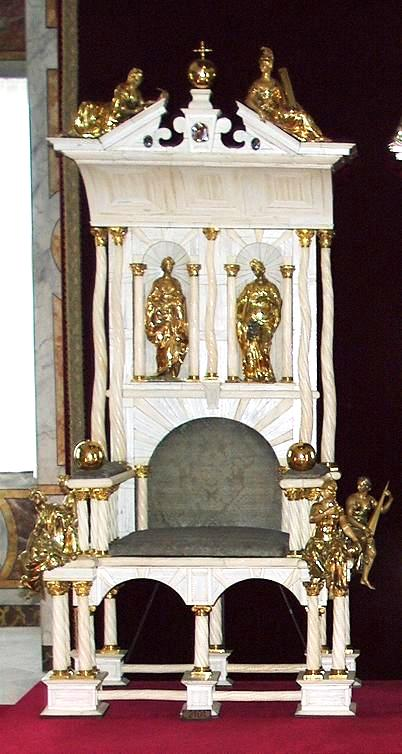
The Throne Chair today.

The Coronation Chair of Denmark (Danish and Norwegian: Danmarks tronstol; also: salvingsstol, kroningsstol) is the chair formerly used in the coronation of the Danish monarch.

According to legend, the Coronation Chair is made of the horn of unicorns. In reality, it is made from Norwegian narwhal tusks. It is guarded by three life-size silver lions, based on Biblical references, and was a symbol of the absolute monarchy of the Twin Kingdoms.

The Coronation Chair is located in the Castle of Rosenborg in Copenhagen.

== History ==
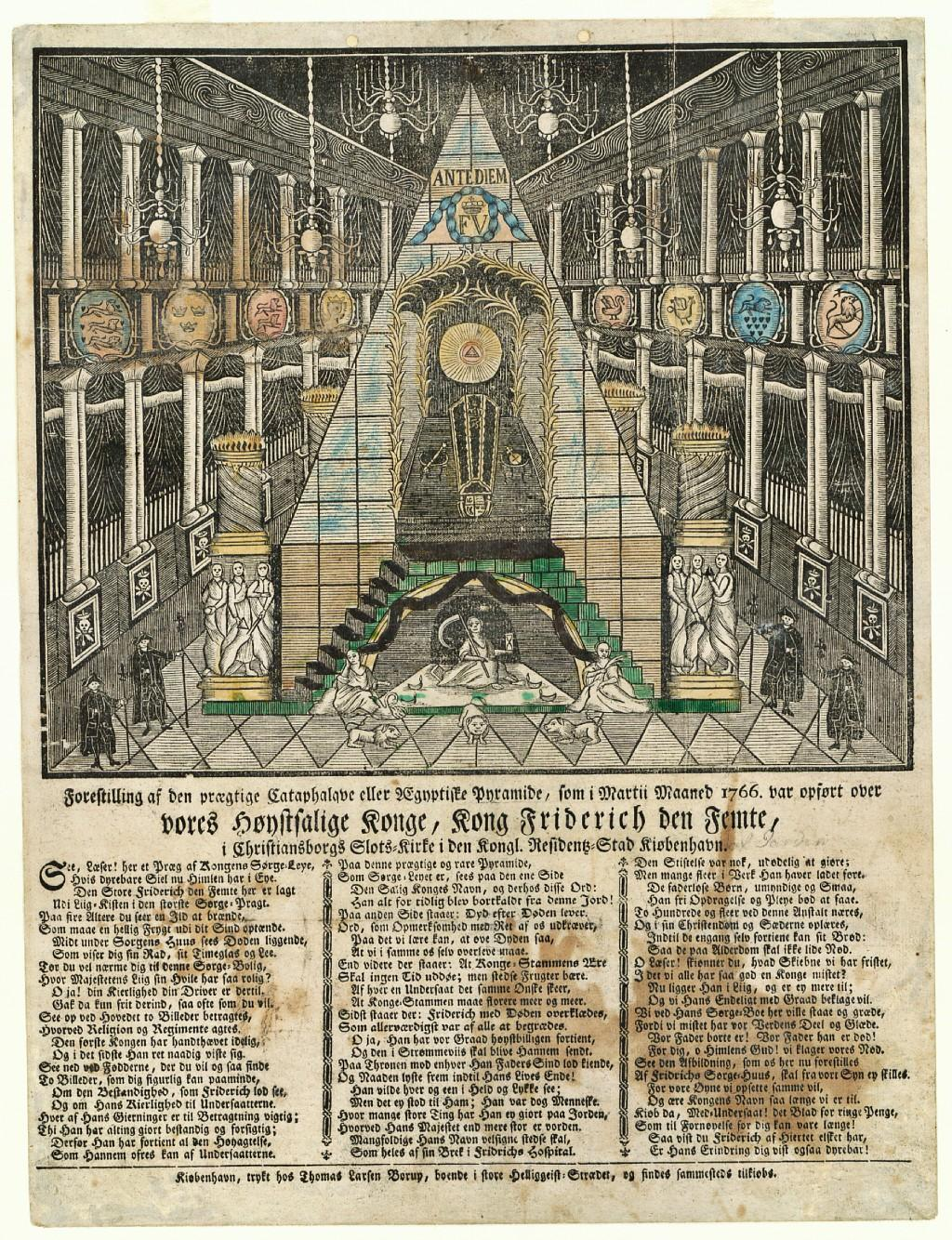
The silver lions in front of king Frederick V's castrum doloris in 1766. By unknown (1766?)

Following the 1660 introduction of absolute monarchy in Denmark and Norway, King Frederick III (r. 1648–1670) ordered a coronation chair to be created. The Coronation Chair was made between 1662 and 1671 by Bendix Grodtschilling. During the reign of King Christian V (r. 1670–1699), gilt figures were added to the chair.

Both the Coronation Chair and the silver lions were inspired by the Biblical throne of Solomon, which was guarded by fourteen lions, as described in I Kings 10:

18 Moreover the king made a great throne of ivory, and overlaid it with the finest gold. 19 There were six steps to the throne, and the top of the throne was round behind; and there were arms on either side by the place of the seat, and two lions standing beside the arms. 20 And twelve lions stood there on the one side and on the other upon the six steps; there was not the like made in any kingdom.

The Coronation Chair was used at coronations between 1671, for Christian V, and 1840. When absolute monarchy was replaced by constitutional monarchy in 1849, kings were no longer crowned or anointed, whereupon the Coronation Chair lost its practical function.

=== Lions ===
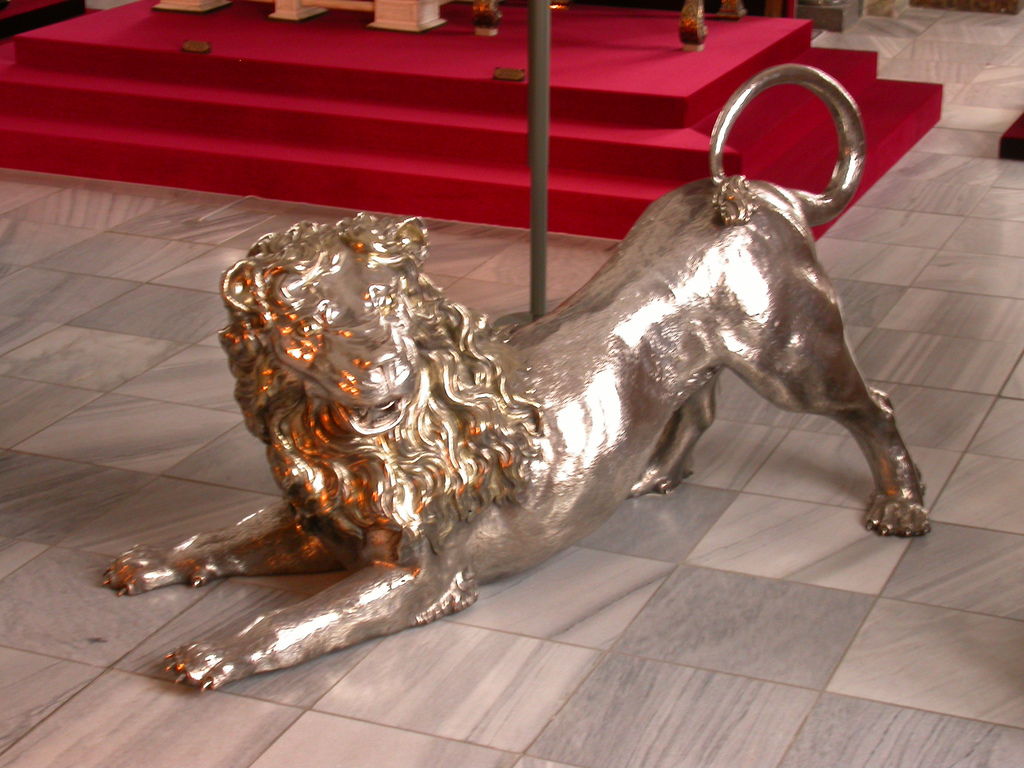
One of the three lions in Rosenborg Castle.

The Coronation Chair is guarded by three lions of silver. They are the same size as natural lions, and each weighs 130 kilos. Their eyes, manes, and rumps are covered with pure gold. They were made between 1665 and 1670 by Ferdinand Kübich.

The silver lions are still used outside Rosenborg, mainly when protecting the castrum doloris of kings.

== In art ==
On 20 November 1905, when delegates of the Norwegian parliament entered the Christian VII Palace in Copenhagen in order to offer the throne of Norway to Prince Carl, they were met—and stopped—by the lions. This moment was immortalized by photographer Peter Elfelt. Based on Elfelt's photograph, painter Paul Fischer made a famous painting. Several versions of this painting have existed, and one is included in the art collections in the Castle of Oslo.

The three silver lions are seen in one of Bjørn Nørgaard's chronological tapestries ("Early Absolutism") in Christiansborg Palace. They are also seen in Michael Melbyes's portrait of Margrethe II in Christiansborg Palace.

== Gallery ==
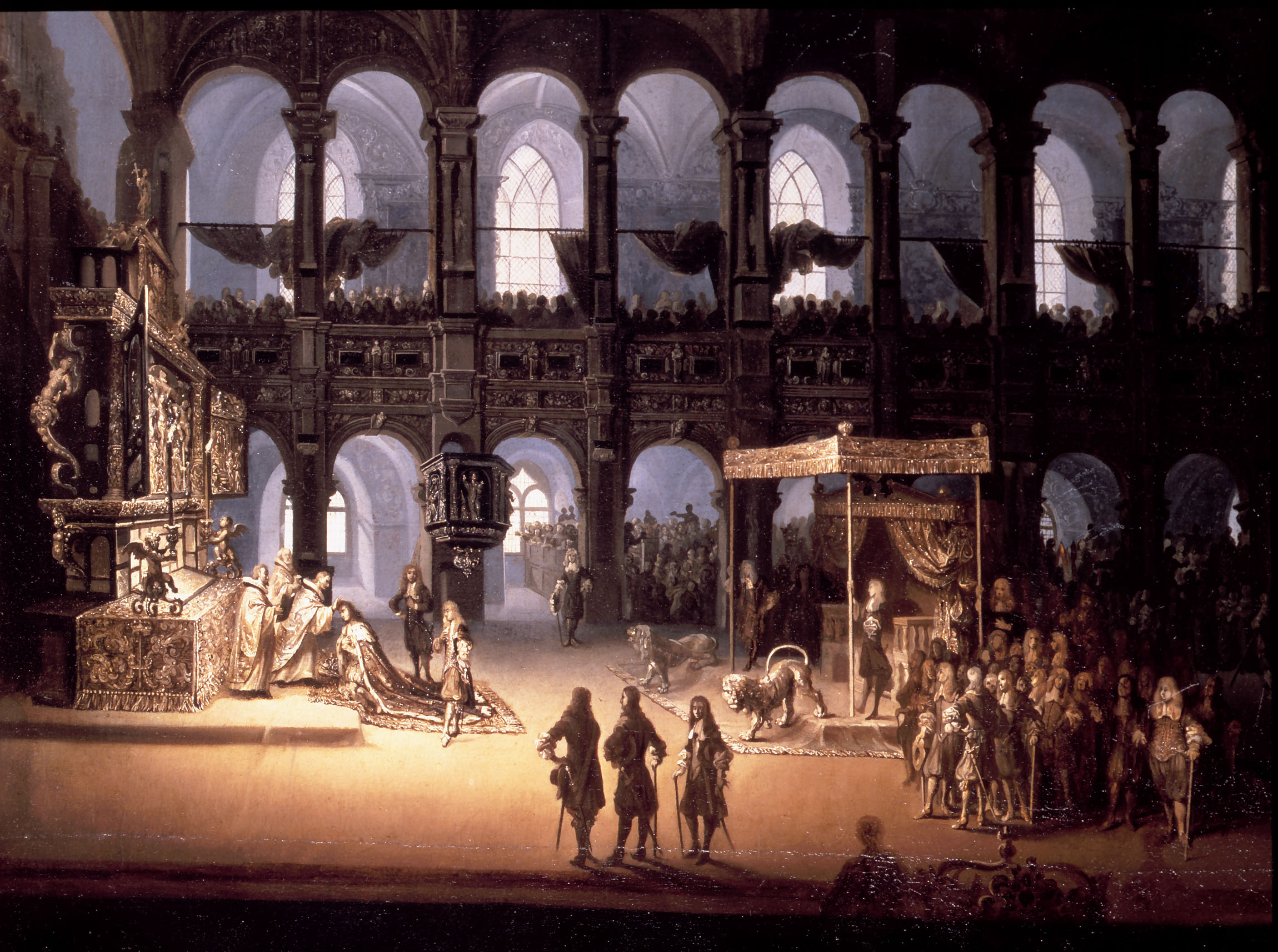
The 1671 anointing of King Christian V
By Michael von Haven (1671)

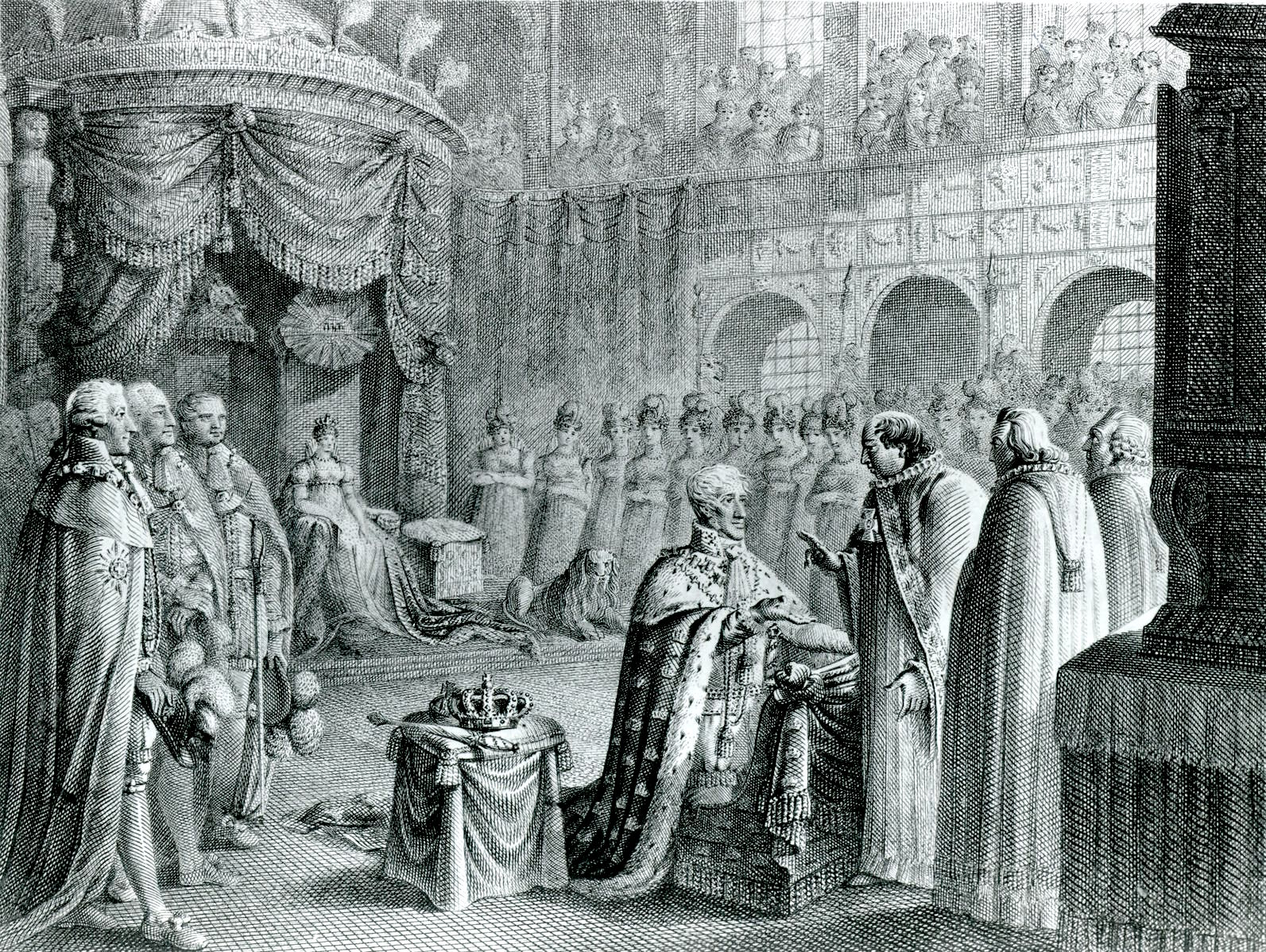
The 1815 anointing of King Frederick VI.
By unknown (1815)

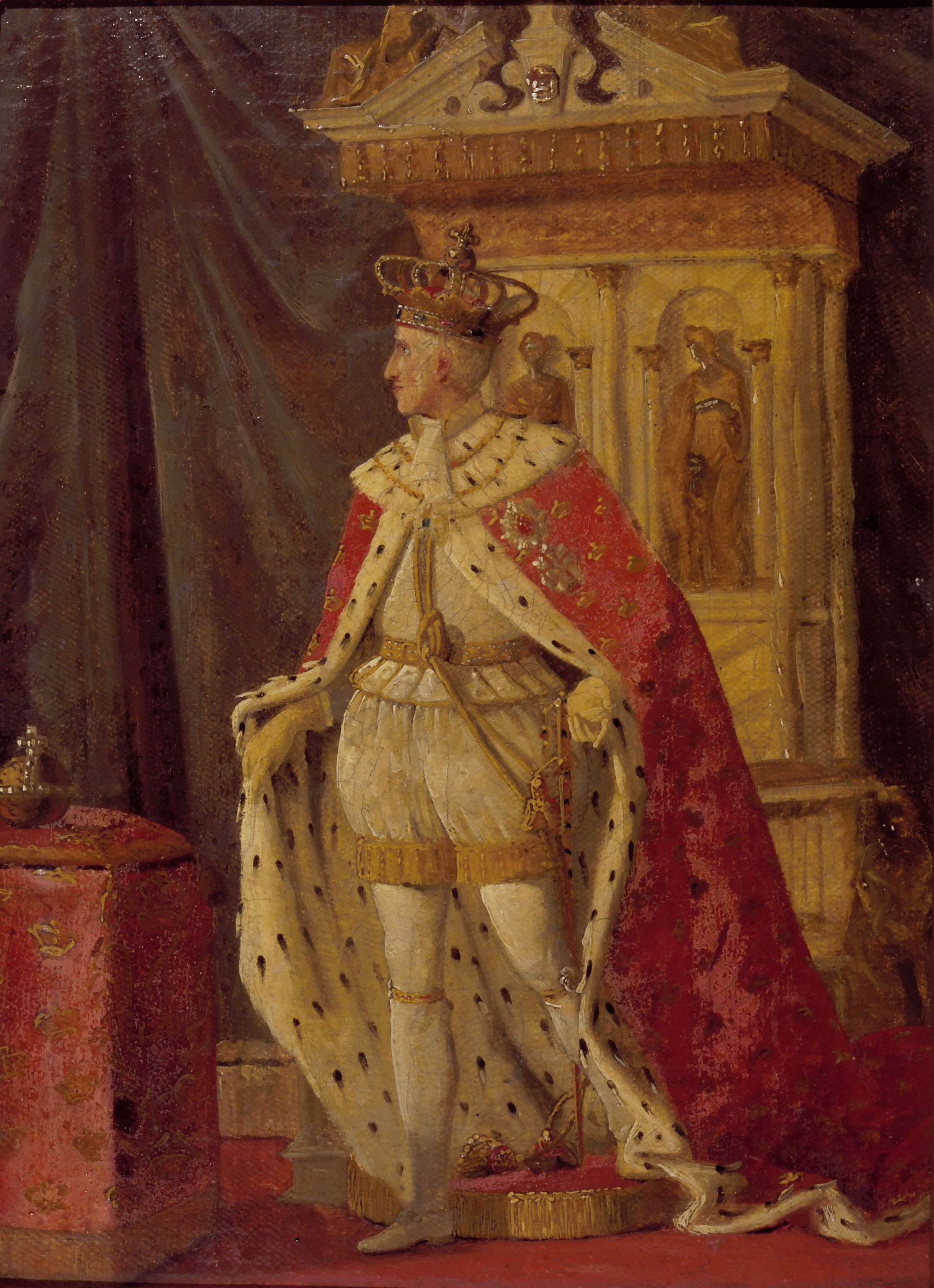
The Coronation Chair and King Frederick VI.
By Wilhelm Bendz (1830)

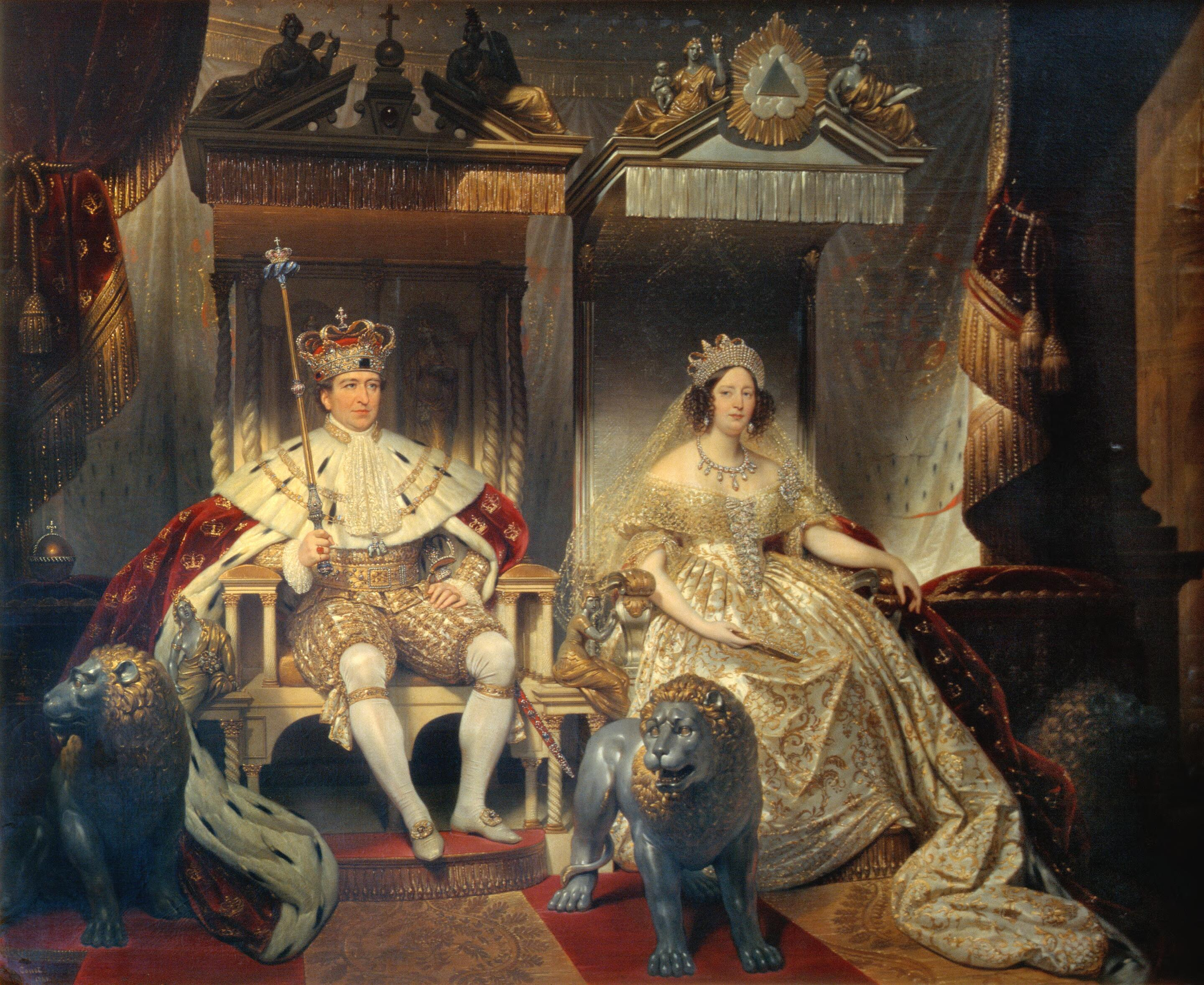
The Coronation Chair and the silver lions at the 1841 coronation of King Christian VIII, by Joseph-Désiré Court (1841)

== See also ==
- Thrones of Norway
- Monarchy of Denmark
- Monarchy of Norway

== Sources ==
- Hein, Jørgen (2006). "En trone af enhjørninghorn og løver av sølv" [A Throne of Unicorn Horn and Lions of Silver] (PDF). Siden Saxo (in Danish) (2). Statens IT: 39–45. Archived from the original (PDF) on 2014-03-25.
