= Thrones of Norway =

Physical representations of the Norwegian monarchy

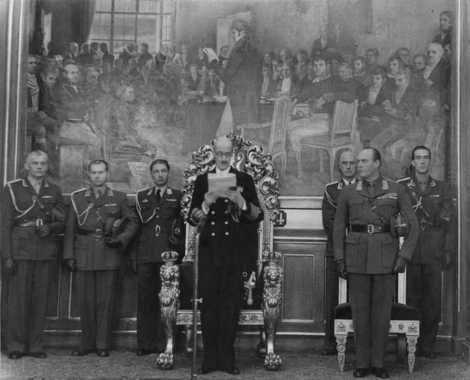
King Haakon VII opening the Parliament in 1950. The Throne Chair is seen behind him. By unknown (1950)

The throne of Norway (Norwegian Bokmål: singular Norges tronstol, plural -stoler; Norwegian Nynorsk: singular Noregs tronstol, plural -stolar) are the physical representations of the monarchy of Norway. One stands in the building of the Parliament in Oslo, the political capital of Norway, where it is used in a political context. The other stands in Trondheim, the religious capital of Norway, where it was used in a religious context. Lesser known is the throne in the Council Chamber in the Royal Palace. In addition to the thrones, there are two coronation chairs (Bokmål and Nynorsk: kroningstol), which are also located in Trondheim. Between 1671 and 1814, the Coronation Chair of Denmark was de facto also Norway's.

== The throne in the Parliament, Oslo ==
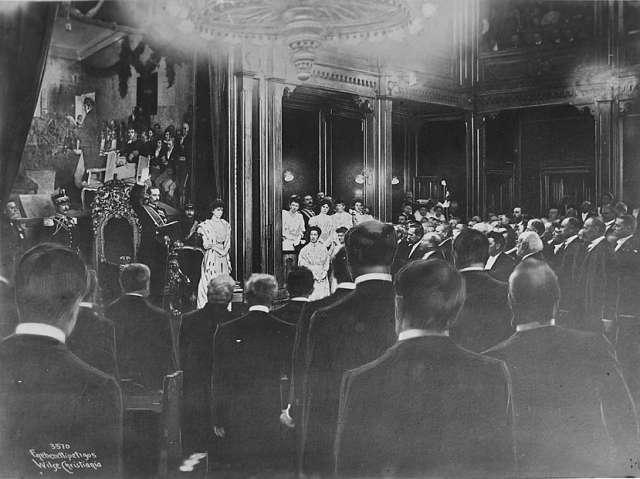
The Throne in 1905, when King Haakon VII took the oath in the Parliament. By Anders Beer Wilse (1905)

The throne was made in 1847 by Wilhelm Heinrich Hoffmann and placed in the Throne Room in the Castle of Oslo (the Royal Palace). Later in the 19th century, the throne was transferred to the Parliament, where it has been located ever since. It is, especially, used when the monarch opens the Parliament every year.

The throne is covered with gold, and the textile is red. These are the colours of the monarch. On the top of the chair is the Coat of arms of Norway. The chair has two crowned lion heads, and the two foremost of the chair's legs resemble lion paws. A golden lion symbolises the monarch.

The throne is 207 centimetres tall and 100 centimetres broad.

Two smaller chairs belong together with the throne; one for the consort and one for the heir apparent.

== The throne in the Royal Palace, Oslo ==
In the Council Chamber in the Royal Palace, where the king receives the Government every Friday, the king has an additional throne. This was made in the 1840s by Hans Linstow.

There is also a slightly smaller chair made in 1997. This belongs to the heir apparent.

== The throne in Trondheim ==
The throne in Trondheim was acquired to the coronation of Oscar II and Sophia of Nassau in 1873.

The throne was used for the last time during the coronation of Haakon VII and Maud of Wales in 1906.

== Coronation chairs ==
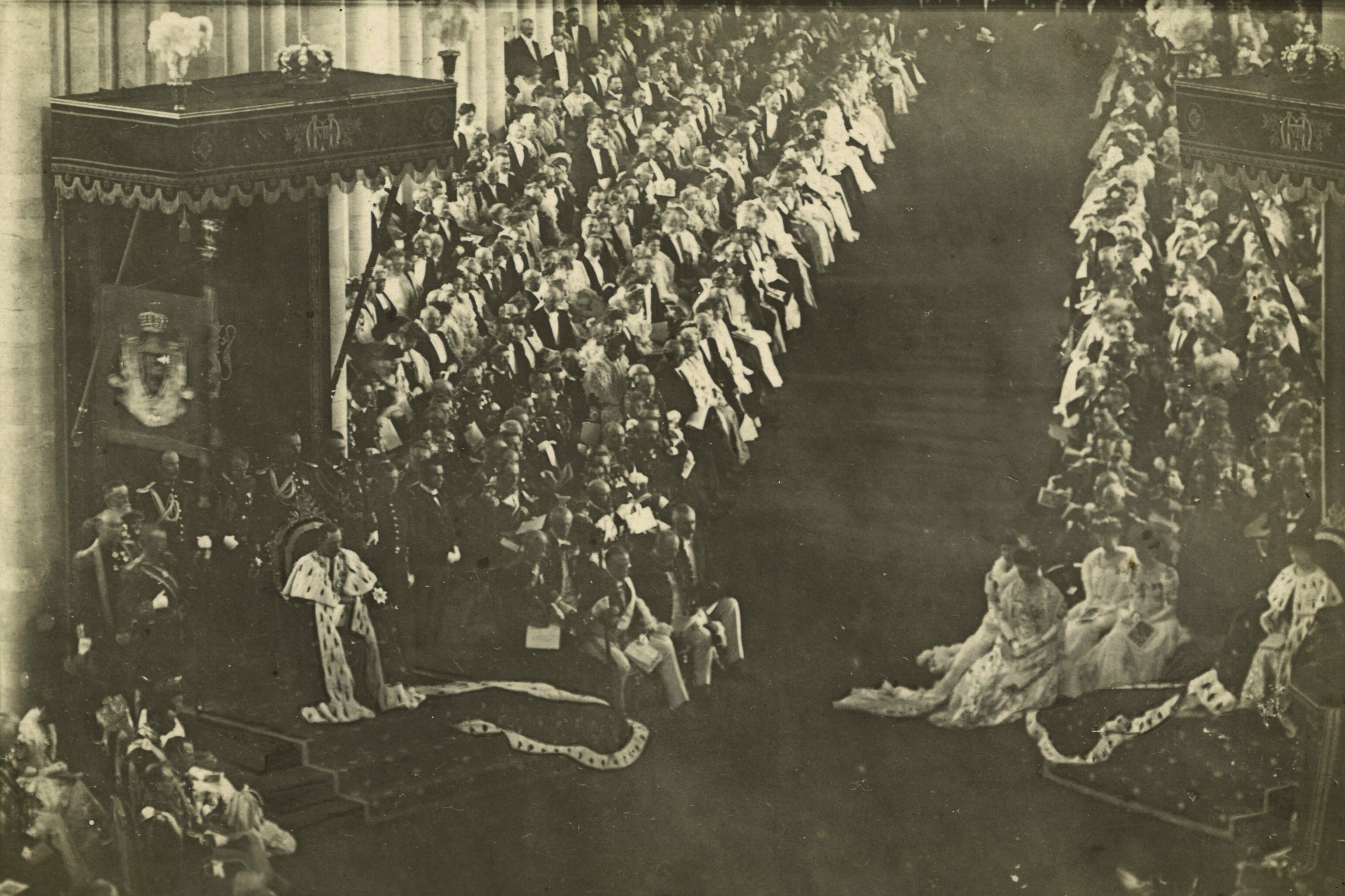
The coronation chairs in 1906, when Haakon VII and Maud were crowned in the Nidaros Cathedral. By unknown (1906)

In 1818, Charles III John used a pair of identical chairs; one as a coronation chair during the ceremony and one as a throne when he was crowned. In addition, there was a chair without arms, used by his son and heir apparent, Oscar.

In 1860, however, when Charles IV and Louise of the Netherlands were crowned, they used the two chairs during the ceremony whilst they, most likely, used Oscar's chair of 1818 as a throne chair when they were crowned.

The 1906 coronation was the last in Norway; in 1908, the provision in the 1814 constitution mandating a coronation was repealed. However, when Olav V became king in 1958, he desired and arranged a "benediction" or blessing ceremony in the Nidaros Cathedral. In this ceremony, the former coronation chairs were used during the service. The same happened in 1991, when Harald V and Sonja Haraldsen were blessed on their royal office.

Other depictions of the coronation chairs:

- The Throne Chair during the coronation of King Charles III John in 1818.

== The Throne in Copenhagen ==
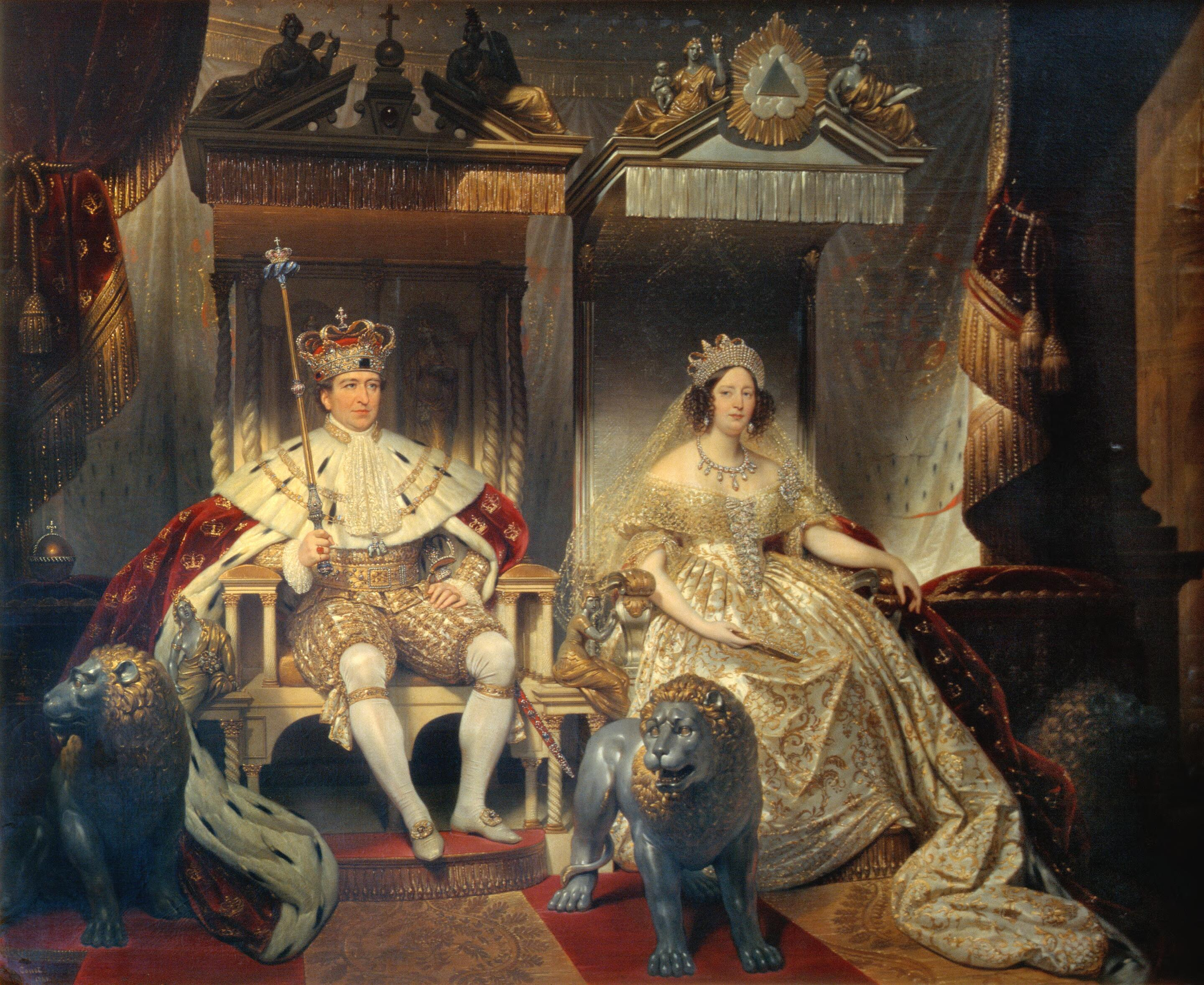
The unicorn throne (left) and the silver lions in 1841, by Joseph-Désiré Court (1841)

Even though Norway was formally an independent realm with its own throne during the Dano-Norwegian union, the Coronation Chair of Denmark was the de facto coronation chair of Norway 1671 - 1814, the royal house being the German House of Oldenburg. Made of narwhal tusk, it was guarded by three lions of silver.
