= Bendix Grodtschilling =

Danish painter and carpenter (c.1620–1690)

- Born: c. 1620; Holstein
- Died: March 1690 (aged 69–70); Copenhagen
- Resting place: Trinitatis Church
- Spouse: Catherine (m. 1678)
- Children: Bendix Grodtschilling the Younger
- Relatives: Bendix Grodtschilling the Youngest (grandson)

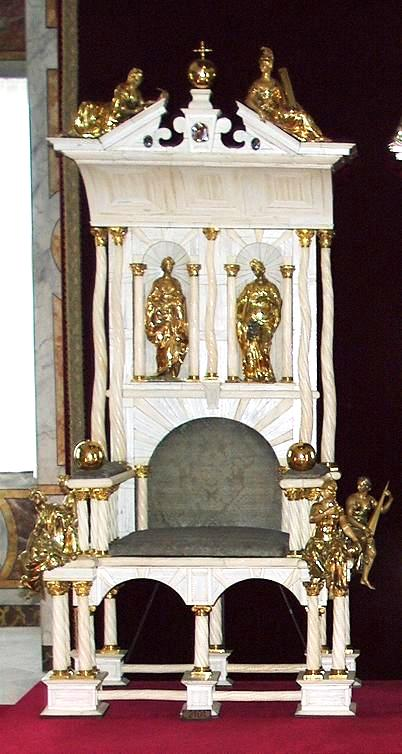
The Throne Chair of Denmark, the coronation chair of the Danish kings by Bendix Grodtschilling, Castle of Rosenborg, 1662-1671

Bendix Grodtschilling, also Bendix Grodtschilling the Elder, (c. 1620 – March 1690) was a Danish painter and carpenter.

== Early life ==
Grodtschilling was born in Holstein (probably in Itzehoe), where he worked in his capacity as a skilled carpenter. After a number of years of residing in Itzehoe and Hamburg, in 1660 he was summoned to Denmark and taken into the king's service.

== Throne Chair of Denmark ==
In 1662 he was commissioned by Frederick III of Denmark for a most important project: the creation of the Throne Chair of Denmark. It took nine years, and he produced it using agate and the ivory of narwhal tusks. The throne is guarded by three lions of silver. The Throne Chair is located in the Castle of Rosenborg in Copenhagen. It is a central symbol of the absolute monarchy in Denmark and Norway.

As the royal art collection in 1680 was preparing to be transferred from Copenhagen Castle to its new building the Christiansborg Palace, Grodtschilling was appointed by Christian V of Denmark as the chief art administrator.

== Family ==
Grodtschilling was twice married; he married his second wife Catherine in August 1678. From his first wife he had a son Bendix Grodtschilling the Younger, and a grandson Bendix Grodtschilling the Youngest, both of whom became painters. Grodtschilling died in Copenhagen and is buried in Trinitatis Church.
