= Unicorn horn =

Legendary object in European and Asian cultures

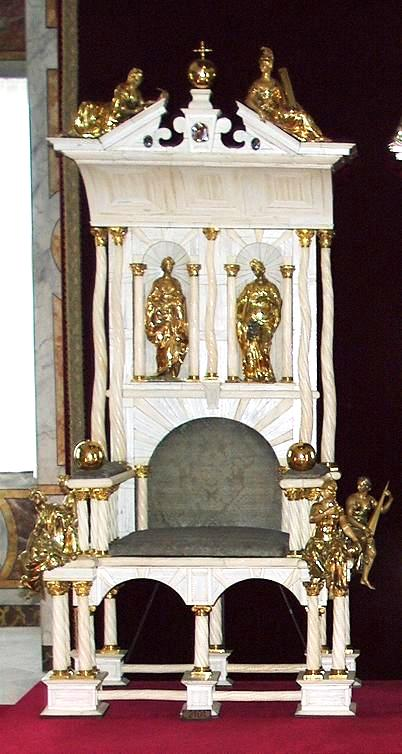
The unicorn throne in Denmark.

A unicorn horn, also known as an alicorn, is a legendary object whose reality was accepted in Europe and Asia from the earliest recorded times. This "horn" comes from the creature known as a unicorn, also known in the Hebrew Bible as a re'em or wild ox. Many healing powers and antidotal virtues were attributed to the alicorn, making it one of the most expensive and reputable remedies during the Renaissance, and justifying its use in the highest circles. Beliefs related to the alicorn influenced alchemy through spagyric medicine. The horn's purificational properties were eventually put to the test in, for example, the book of Ambroise Paré, Discourse on unicorn.

Seen as one of the most valuable assets that a person could possess, unicorn horns were given as diplomatic gifts, and chips and dust from them could be purchased at apothecaries as universal antidotes until the 18th century. Sections of horns were later displayed in cabinets of curiosities. The horn was used to create sceptres and other royal objects, such as the unicorn throne of the Danish kings, the sceptre and imperial crown of the Austrian Empire, and the scabbard and the hilt of the sword of Charles the Bold. The legendary unicorn could never be captured alive, but its symbolic association with virginity made it the symbol of innocence and the incarnation of God's Word.

Belief in the power of the alicorn persisted until the 16th century, when the true source, the narwhal, was discovered. This marine mammal is the true bearer of the alicorn, actually an extended tooth found in the mouth of males and some females. Since then, the unicorn horn has been mentioned in fantasy works, role-playing games, and video games, which make use of its legendary symbolism.

== Nature and properties ==
Around 400 BCE, the unicorn was described by Ctesias, according to Photius, as carrying a horn which princes would use to make hanaps to protect against poison. Claudius Aelianus said that drinking from this horn protects against diseases and poisons. These writings influenced authors from the Middle Ages to the Renaissance: the unicorn becomes the most important and frequently mentioned fantastic animal in the West, but it was considered real. Other parts of its body were alleged to have medicinal properties, and in the 12th century abbess Hildegard of Bingen recommended an ointment against leprosy made from unicorn liver and egg yolk. Wearing a unicorn leather belt was supposed to protect a person from the plague and fevers, while leather shoes of this animal prevented diseases of the feet, legs and loins.

The medicinal efficacy linked to its horn and its alexipharmic powers were assumed to be true in antiquity, but were not explicitly mentioned in the West again until the 14th century. Legends about these properties were the stimulus for a flourishing trade in these chips and dust up to the mid-17th century, when their true origin became widely known. The alicorn never existed as such; it was most often narwhal teeth that were known as "unicorn horns".

=== Water purification ===
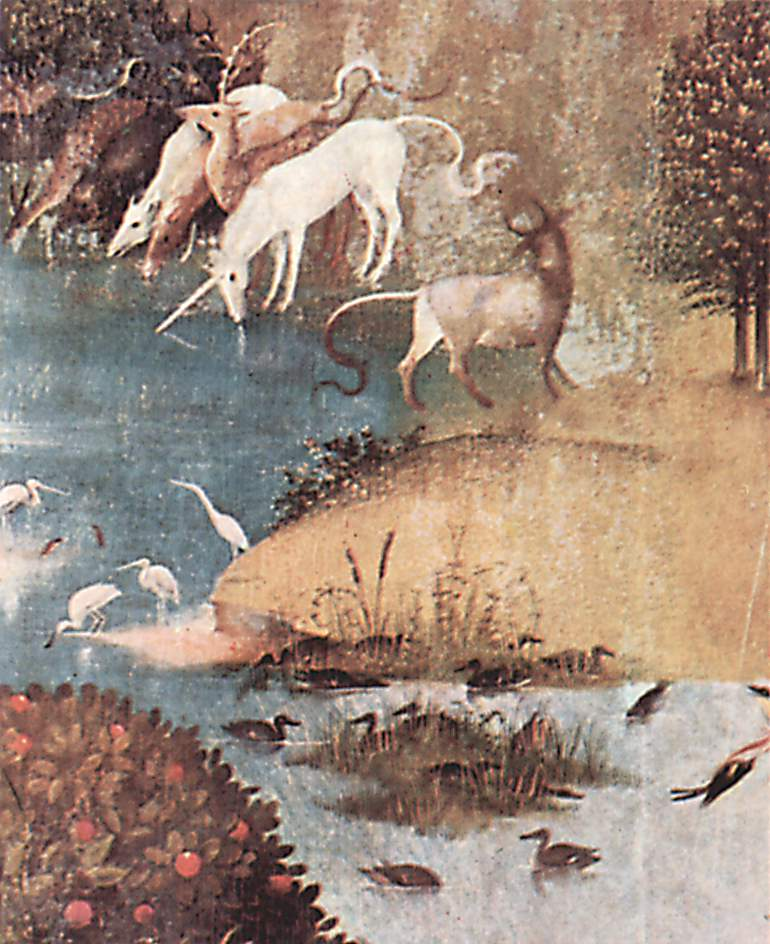
Left panel of The Garden of Earthly Delights by Hieronymus Bosch (1503-1504), showing unicorns purifying water.

The first post-classical reference to the cleansing power of the unicorn appears in an interpretation of the Physiologus (dated perhaps to the 14th century), when reference is made to a large lake where animals congregate to drink:

But before they are assembled, the serpent comes and casts his poison into the water. Now the animals mark well the poison and do not dare to drink, and they wait for the unicorn. It comes and immediately goes into the lake, and making with his horn the sign of the cross, renders the power of the poison harmless Freeman 1983, p. 27

This theme became very popular, and in 1389 Father Johann van Hesse claimed to have seen a unicorn emerge at sunrise to decontaminate the contaminated water of the River Marah, so that the good animals could drink. Freeman 1983, p. 27 Symbolically, the snake that poisons the water is the devil and the unicorn represents Christ the Redeemer. The origin of this legend seems Indian, and Greek texts report that Indian nobles drank out of unicorn horns to protect themselves from diseases and poisons.

The unicorn is most often represented beside a river, lake or fountain, while animals wait for him to finish his work before drinking. This scene is common in the art of the 16th and 17th centuries. Studies and translations of these drawings and stories popularized the belief that the power of the animal came from its horn, which could neutralize the poison as soon as the liquid or solid touched the alicorn piece.

=== Medicinal properties ===
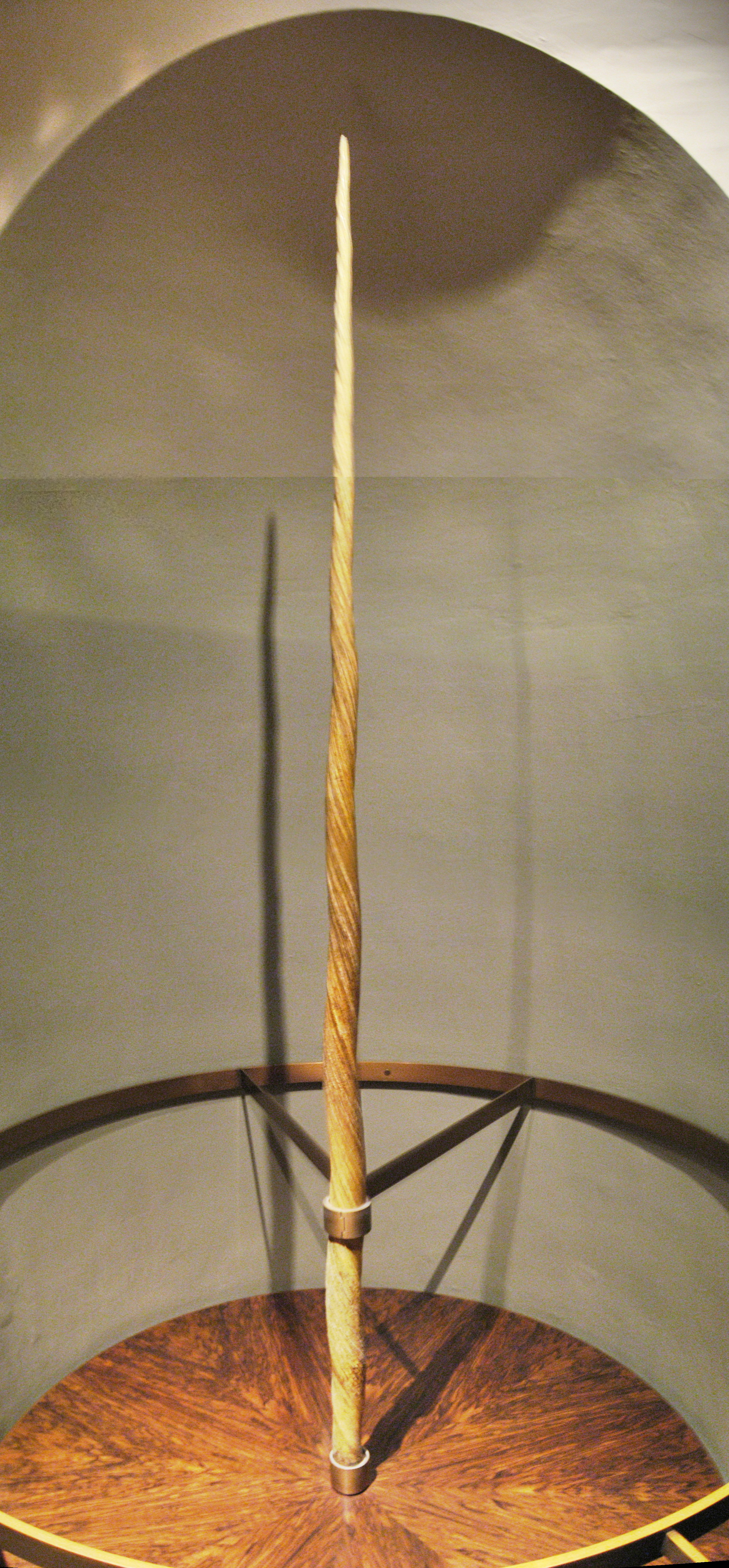
Ainkhürn, "unicorn horn", offered to the Holy Roman Emperor Ferdinand I in 1540, exhibited at Wiener Schatzkammer.

The alleged properties of the alicorn may be compared with those of the bezoar stone, another object of animal origin known to Renaissance medicine and exposed as a rarity in the cabinets of curiosities.

The alicorn was assigned many medicinal properties and, over time, in addition to the purification of polluted water in nature, its use was recommended against rubella, measles, fevers and pains. The monks of the Parisian monasteries used to soak it in the drinking water given to lepers. It was thought to act as an antidote and, in a powder form, was known to facilitate wound healing, help neutralize poisons (such as scorpion or viper venom) or against the plague. The horn was prepared in several ways, in solid form, or by infusion

Its prophylactic function and magical power were assumed for centuries; as its trade increased, "fake" horns and false powders appeared. The astronomical prices paid for alicorn reflected the belief that their imaginary virtues could cause real healing.

Many works are devoted to the explanation and defence of the medicinal properties of the alicorn, including The Treaty of the Unicorn, its wonderful properties and its use (1573) by Andrea Bacci and Natural History, Hunting, Virtues, and Use of Lycorn (1624) by apothecary Laurent Catelan. Bacci probably wrote his book at the request of his patients, who were major investors in the unicorn horn trade.

=== Display and use as antipoison ===
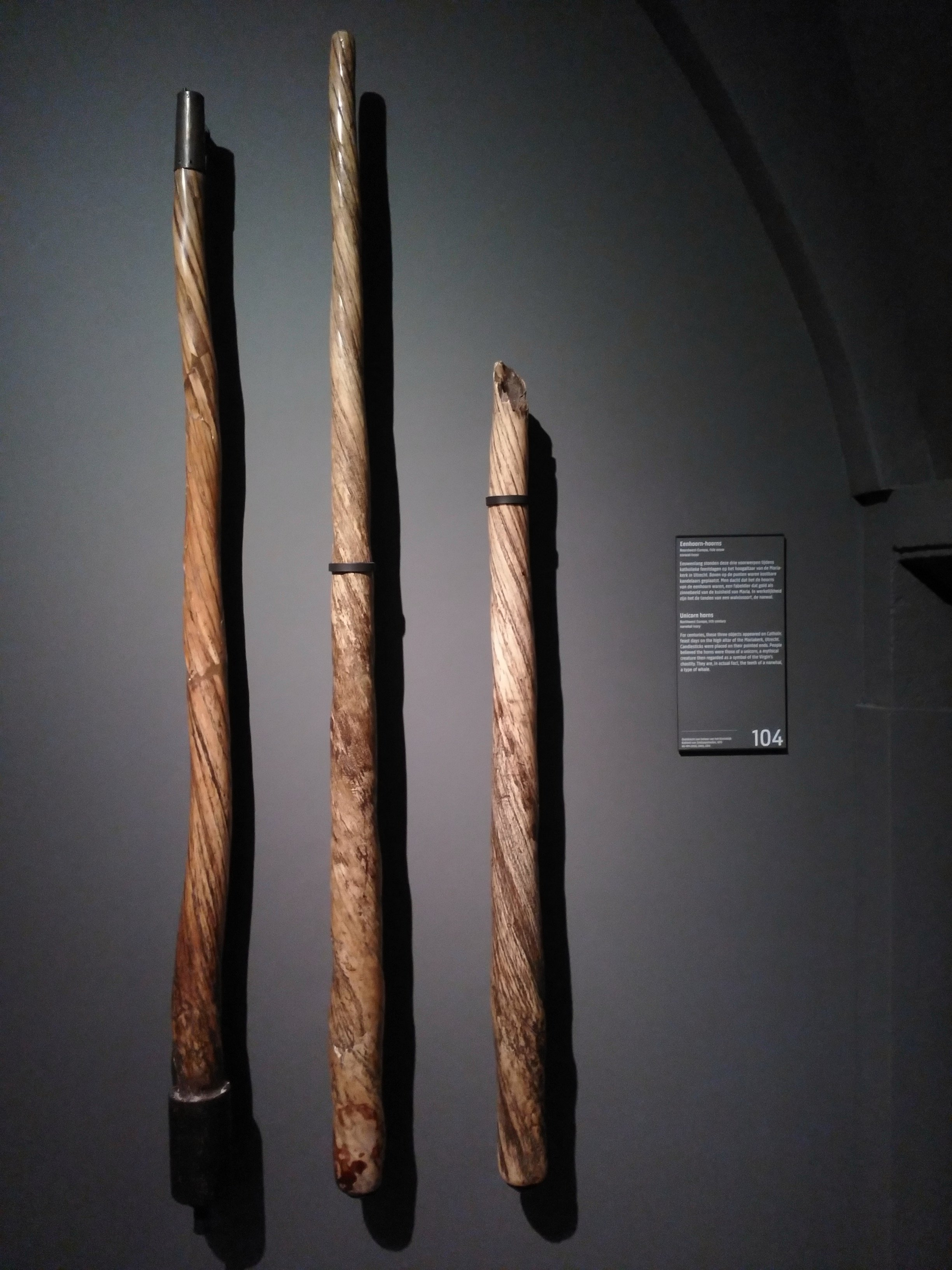
Three unicorn horns from the Mariakerk in Utrecht, now on display at the Rijksmuseum.

Of a twisted configuration, alicorns were traded as valuable items for many centuries: according to legend, the "horn" on display at the Musée national du Moyen Âge was a gift from the Caliph of Baghdad, Harun al-Rashid, to Charlemagne in 807. It measures almost three meters. An eight-foot long horn is exhibited in Bruges, Flanders. In the Middle Ages, the alicorn was the most valuable asset that a prince could possess. Its medicinal use was attested and revived possibly in the 13th century, when pharmacists incorporated narwhal teeth (presented as unicorn horns) in their treatments; they displayed large pieces in order to distinguish it from products of other animals, such as the ox. These objects would have been exchanged up to eleven times their weight in gold. Depictions of unicorns in a religious context were discouraged indirectly by the Council of Trent in 1563, despite their display in the Saint-Denis Cathedral in Paris, and St Mark's Basilica in Venice. They were often mounted on silver socles and presented as trophies that were only shown for important ceremonies.

Ambroise Paré explains that alicorns were used in the court of the King of France to detect the presence of poison in food and drink: if the comestible became hot and started to smoke, then the dish was poisoned. Pope Clement VII offered a unicorn horn two cubits long to King Francis I of France at the wedding of his niece Catherine de' Medici in Marseille in October 1533, and the king did not ever move without a bag filled with unicorn powder. Also, the Grand Inquisitor Torquemada always carried unicorn horn to protect himself from poison and murderers.

== Bibliography ==
=== Founding works on medicine and alchemy ===
- Hildegarde de Bingen (1989). Le Livre des subtilités des créatures divines (in French). Vol. II. Paris: Millon. ISBN 2905614315.
- Marini, Andrea (1566). Discorso contro la falsa opinione dell'Alicorno (in Italian). Venice.
- Bacci, Andrea (1573). L'alicorno discorso dell'eccellente medico et filosofo M. Andrea Bacci: nel quale si tratta della natura dell' alicorno et delle sue virtu eccellentissime (in Italian). G. Marescotti. p. 80.
- Paré, Ambroise (1582). Discours d'Ambroise Paré : À savoir, de la mumie, de la licorne, des venins et de la peste (in French). Paris.
- Paré, Ambroise (1928). Voyages et apologie suivis du Discours de la licorne (in French).
- Pomis, David (1587). Dittionario novo hebraïco (in Italian). Venice.
- Linocier, Geoffroy (1584). Histoire des plantes avec leurs pourtraictz, à laquelle sont adjoutées celles des simples, aromatiques, animaux à quatre pieds, oiseaux, serpens et autres bêtes venimeuses (in French). Paris.
- Valentine, Basil (1678). Triumphal Chariot of Antimony.
- Rodrigo a Castro, Esteban (1621). De Meteoris Microcosmi (in Italian). Florence.
- Catelan, Laurent (1624). Histoire de la nature, chasse, vertus, proprietez et usage de la lycorne (in French).
- Pomet, Pierre (1696). Histoire générale des drogues, traitant des plantes, des minéraux et des animaux (in French). Vol. II. Paris.

=== Founding travel and exploration stories ===
- Belon, Pierre (1553). Les Observations de plusieurs singularités et choses mémorables trouvées en Grèce, Asie, Judée, Égypte, Arabie et autres pays estranges, rédigées en trois livres (in French). Paris: G. Corrozet.
- Goropius, Johannes (1569). Origines Antwerpianæ (in Dutch). Antwerp.
- Mercator, Gérard (1607). Atlas Minor: traduction française par M. de la Popelinière (in French). Amsterdam.
- Bartholin, Thomas (1645). De Unicornu Observationes Novæ (in Latin). Padoue.
- Collinson, Sir Richard (1867). The Three Voyages of Martin Frobisher in Search of a Passage to Cathaia and India by the North-West, 1576-8, A.D. 1576-8. London: Hakluyt Society. p. 374.

=== Founding works on zoology ===
- Gesner, Conrad (1603). Historiæ Animalium de Quadrupedibus Viviparis (in Latin). Frankfurt. Archived from the original on August 28, 2013.
- Aldrovandi, Ulisse (1616). De Quadrupedibus Solipedibus (in Italian). Bologna.
- Valentini, Michael Bernhard (1704). "30". Museum Museorum (in Latin). Vol. III. Frankfurt.
- Linné, Carl von (1793). Systema Naturae (in Latin). Brussels.

=== Theses and studies ===
- Lutavd, Auguste Joseph (1906). La médecine anecdotique, historique, littéraire (in French). Vol. 1. J. Rousset.
- Buck, August; Centre d'études supérieures de la Renaissance (1973). Sciences de la Renaissance. Vol. 27 de De Pétrarque à Descartes. Vrin. ISBN 978-2-7116-0680-1.
- Freeman, Margaret (1983). La chasse à la licorne: prestigieuse tenture française des Cloisters (in French). Lausanne: Edita. p. 247. ISBN 9782880010508.
- Malrieu, Pierre (1987). Le bestiaire insolite: l'animal dans la tradition, le mythe, le rêve [The unusual bestiary: the animal in tradition, myth, dream]. Les Fêtes de l'irréel (in French). La Duraulié.
- Giblin, James (1991). The truth about unicorns. Illustrated by Michael McDermott. HarperCollins. ISBN 978-0-06-022479-0.
- Lecouteux, Claude (1993). Les monstres dans la pensée médiévale européenne: essai de présentation (in French). Paris: Presses de l'Université de Paris-Sorbonne. p. 183. ISBN 9782840500216.
- Faidutti, Bruno (1996). Images et connaissance de la licorne: (Fin du Moyen Âge - xixe siècle) (Ph.D.) (in French). Vol. 1. Université Paris-XII.
- de Tervarent, Guy (1997). Attributs et symboles dans l'art profane: dictionnaire d'un langage perdu (1450-1600) (in French). Librairie Droz. p. 535. ISBN 9782600005074.
- Davenne, Christine (2004). Modernité du cabinet de curiosités (in French). L'Harmattan. p. 299. ISBN 9782747558600.

=== Popular works ===
- Rochelandet, Brigitte (2003). Monstres et merveilles de Franche-Comté: fées, fantômes et dragons [Monsters and wonders of Franche-Comté: fairies, ghosts and dragons]. Archives vivantes (in French). Cabedita. ISBN 978-2-88295-400-8.
- Brasey, Édouard (2007). La Petite Encyclopédie du merveilleux [The Little Encyclopedia of the Marvelous] (in French). Paris: Éditions Le Pré aux clercs. ISBN 978-2-84228-321-6.
