= Bendix Grodtschilling the Youngest =

Danish painter and conchologist

- Born: 12 August 1686; Copenhagen
- Died: 23 March 1737 (aged 50)
- Resting place: Trinitatis Church
- Spouse: Agnes Margaret Fogelman
- Father: Bendix Grodtschilling the Younger
- Relatives: Bendix Grodtschilling (grandfather)

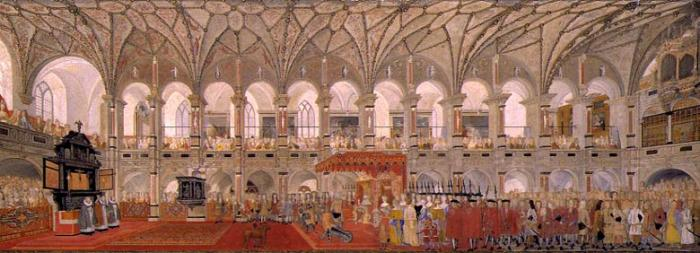
The Anointing of Frederick IV of Denmark in Frederiksborg Palace by Bendix Grodtschilling the Youngest, Castle of Rosenborg, 1706

Bendix Grodtschilling the Youngest (12 August 1686 – 23 March 1737) was a Danish painter and conchologist.

Grodtschilling was born in Copenhagen, the son of the painter Bendix Grodtschilling the Younger and grandson of the painter Bendix Grodtschilling the Elder. He took over from his father as royal court painter, but he struggled with debts and poor health. His wife was Agnes Margaret born Fogelman. Grodtschilling is buried in Trinitatis Church.
