= Bendix Grodtschilling the Younger =

Danish painter

- Born: 1 December 1655; Itzehoe
- Died: 10 March 1707 (aged 51); Copenhagen
- Resting place: Trinitatis Church
- Spouse: Anne Cathrine Eiler Daughter Sander
- Children: 12, including Bendix Grodtschilling the Youngest
- Father: Bendix Grodtschilling

Bendix Grodtschilling the Younger (1 December 1655 – 10 March 1707) was a Danish painter.

Grodtschilling was born in Itzehoe, the son of the painter Bendix Grodtschilling the Elder's first marriage. He was in France and Italy and trained as a painter, but initially was only an insignificant and little fertile artist in portrait art. He returned to Denmark around 1670, and already in 1672 it is documented that he received payment of three skillings for works he had delivered for Rosenborg Castle. His father gave him regular work of the royal court, and in 1690 he was named official royal court painter, which paid him 100 crowns annually. When his father died the same year, followed Grodtschilling him in office as manager. Among his paintings are: Grodtschilling the Elder's portrait, now at Rosenborg Castle, Christian V of Denmark on horseback, at the old Copenhagen Castle, and an "optical piece": the Oldenburg kings with Christian V in the middle. He also had drawings for Rosenborg Castle wallpapers (except for those in the Great Hall and data sheet. I, 252). In 1704 he was assessor in the ducal court. Grodtschilling died in Copenhagen and is buried in the Trinitatis Church; his wife, Anne Cathrine Eiler Daughter Sander or Zanders, died 1716. For their 12 children, most died young, but one son Bendix Grodtschilling the Youngest became a painter as well.
