= The Wedding of Leopold I of Belgium and Louise of Orléans =

Painting by Joseph-Désiré Court

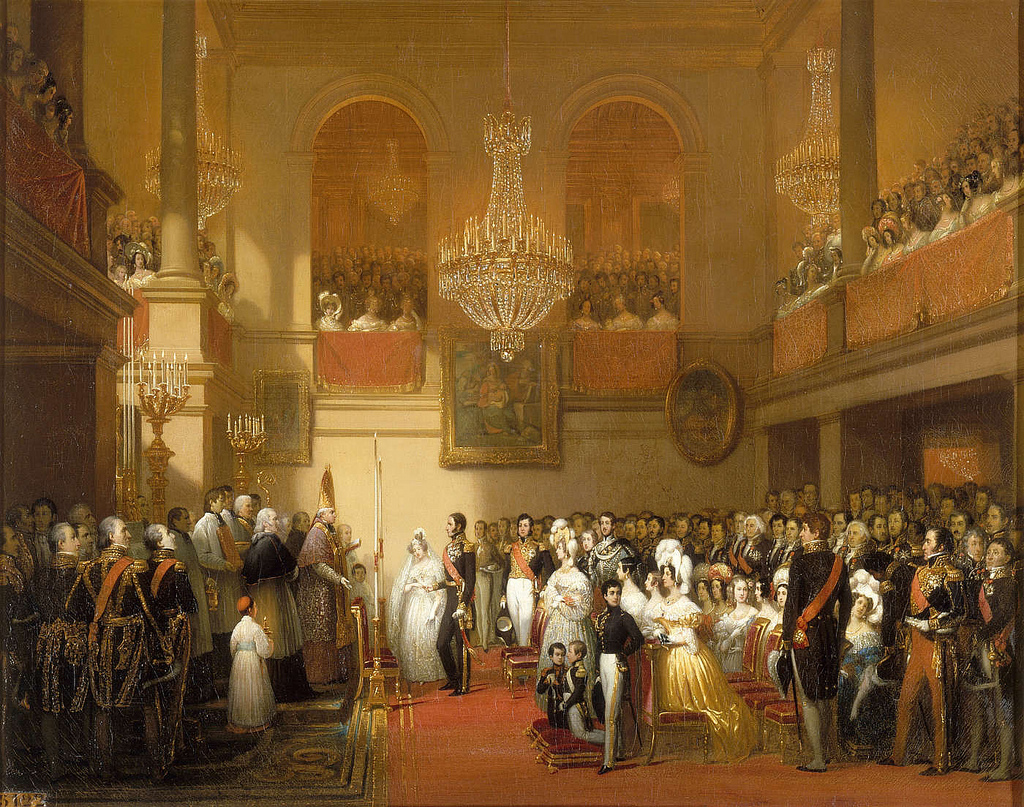
- Artist: Joseph-Désiré Court
- Year: 1837
- Type: Oil on canvas, history painting
- Dimensions: 263 cm × 393 cm (104 in × 155 in)
- Location: Château de Compiègne, Compiègne

The Wedding of Leopold I of Belgium and Louise of Orléans (French: Le Mariage de Léopold Ier, roi de Belges, et de Louise d'Orléans) is an 1837 history painting by the French artist Joseph-Désiré Court. It depicts the wedding between Leopold I of Belgium and Louise of Orléans that took place at the Château de Compiègne on 9 August 1832. Leopold, the first King of Belgium with strong connections to the British Royal Family, made a dynastic match with Louise who was the eldest daughter of the French monarch Louis Philippe I. France had provided military support to Belgium against the Netherlands during recent fighting in the wake of the Belgian Revolution.

The painting was commissioned by Louis Philippe I to commemorate the event. Today the work hangs at the Château de Compiègne. A version also exists in the collection of the Musée de l'Histoire de France at the Palace of Versailles.

== Bibliography ==
- Andrews, Gordon P. & Wangdi, Yosay D. (ed.) The Role of Agency and Memory in Historical Understanding: Revolution, Reform, and Rebellion. Cambridge Scholars Publishing, 2017.
- Caude, Élisabeth. Le palais impérial de Compiègne. Musées et monuments de France, 2008.
- Dion-Tenenbaum, Anne. Marie d'Orléans, 1813-1839: Princesse et artiste romantique. Musée du Louvre, 2008.
- Price, Munro. The Perilous Crown: France Between Revolutions, 1814-1848. Pan Macmillan, 2010.
