= Coronation chair =

The Coronation Chair is the throne used by British monarchs during their coronation.

Other thrones which may be referred to as coronation chairs include:

- Chair of St Augustine, used at the enthronement of the Archbishop of Canterbury
- Chair of Saint Peter, the traditional throne of the Pope
- Coronation Chair of Denmark
- Silver Throne, used at the coronations of Swedish monarchs
