= Portrait of Sylvain Charles Valée =

Painting by Joseph-Désiré Court

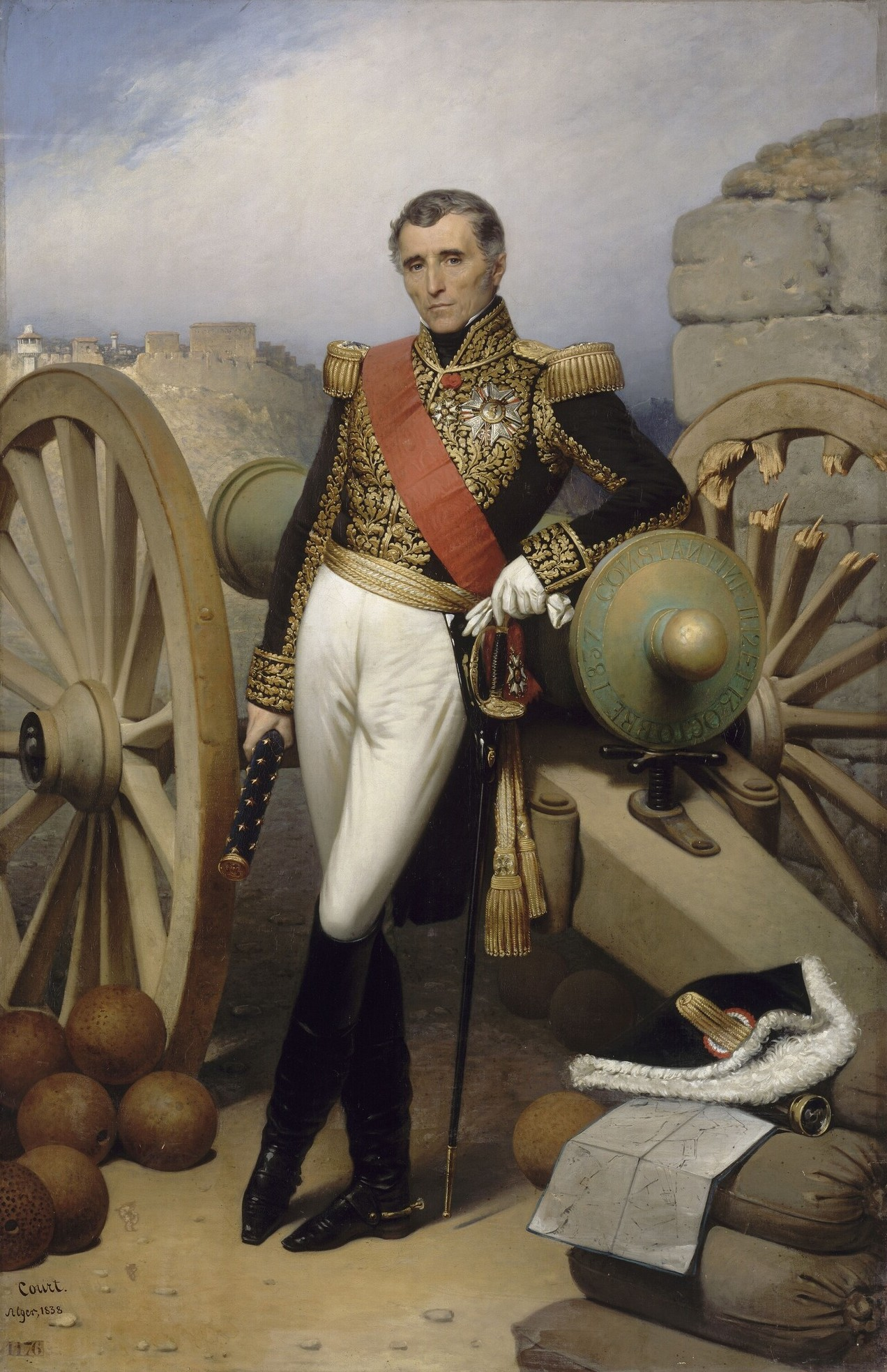
- Artist: Joseph-Désiré Court
- Year: 1838
- Type: Oil on canvas, portrait painting
- Dimensions: 215 cm × 130 cm (85 in × 51 in)
- Location: Palace of Versailles; Versailles

Portrait of Sylvain Charles Valée is an 1838 portrait painting by the French artist Joseph-Désiré Court. It depicts the French military commander Sylvain Charles Valée. A veteran artillery officer of the Napoleonic Wars he had recently led the storming of Constantine, a major victory during the French conquest of Algeria. On his return he was promoted to the rank of Marshal and also functioned as Governor General of Algeria.

The painting depicts him at full-length against the Algerian landscape, leaning against a cannon. The work was commissioned for the sum of 1,500 francs by Louis Philippe I for the Palace of Versailles, part of a major project to glorify French military achievements and draw comparisons with the current July Monarchy and the Napoleonic era. It was displayed at the Salon of 1839 held at the Louvre in Paris. Today it is in the Museum of French History at the Palace of Versailles. A second different painting of Valée by Court is in the collection of the Louvre.

== Bibliography ==
- Briat, Anne-Marie. Des chemins et des hommes: la France en Algérie, 1830-1962. Editions Harriet, 1995.
- Hornstein, Katie. Picturing War in France, 1792–1856. Yale University Press, 2018.
