= Joseph-Désiré Court =

French painter (1797–1865)

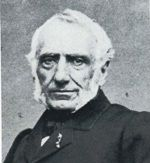
Portrait of Court, c. 1865

Joseph-Désiré Court (14 September 1797 – 23 January 1865) was a French painter who specialised in history painting and portrait painting.

== Life and work ==
He was a descendant of the portrait painter Hyacinthe Rigaud and displayed an early interest in art. His first studies were with Marc-Antoine Descamps, at a drawing school established by Descamps' father, Jean-Baptiste. Following that, he worked at the studios of Antoine-Jean Gros in Paris.

His allowance from his family was not quite enough for his needs, so he painted small pictures, which he sold through an agent. Despite this, he was unable to save enough money to continue his studies in Rome. Hoping that he could go at the expense of the state, he competed for the Prix de Rome and, in 1821, was awarded a prize for his depiction of Samson and Delilah. During his stay there, he continued to send works back to Paris for exhibition. His painting, "The Death of Caesar", was acquired by the Musée du Luxembourg in 1827.

In 1828, the Académie de Rouen named him a corresponding member, and commissioned a large painting for their new meeting room. Although their request was for an easel painting only, he produced a monumental canvas depicting the playwright Corneille, receiving honors from the nobility after the premiere of his tragedy, Cinna. Court was presented with a gold medal in gratitude.

Following the July Revolution, the government of King Louis-Philippe held a competition for a large canvas, to adorn the new room at the Chamber of Deputies. Three topics were offered. Court chose to paint Mirabeau facing Dreux-Brézé at the Estates General of 1789. His sketch came in second. Dissatisfied with the jury's decision, he executed the painting anyway; exhibiting it at the Salon of 1833. It may now be seen at the Musée des Beaux-Arts de Rouen. He did eventually receive some major public commissions, including figures for the Hôtel de Ville (1841), and paintings for the dome of Saint Isaac's Cathedral (1850). Much of his work was, however, devoted to portraiture.

He had long wanted to return to his hometown so, in 1853, he accepted an appointment as Conservator at the Musée de Rouen; immediately beginning a project to renovate the museum's rooms.

He succumbed to an unspecified chronic illness while in Paris receiving treatment. His remains were taken home and interred at the Rouen Monumental Cemetery. He had been the recipient of numerous honors, including the Legion of Honor in 1838.

== Gallery ==
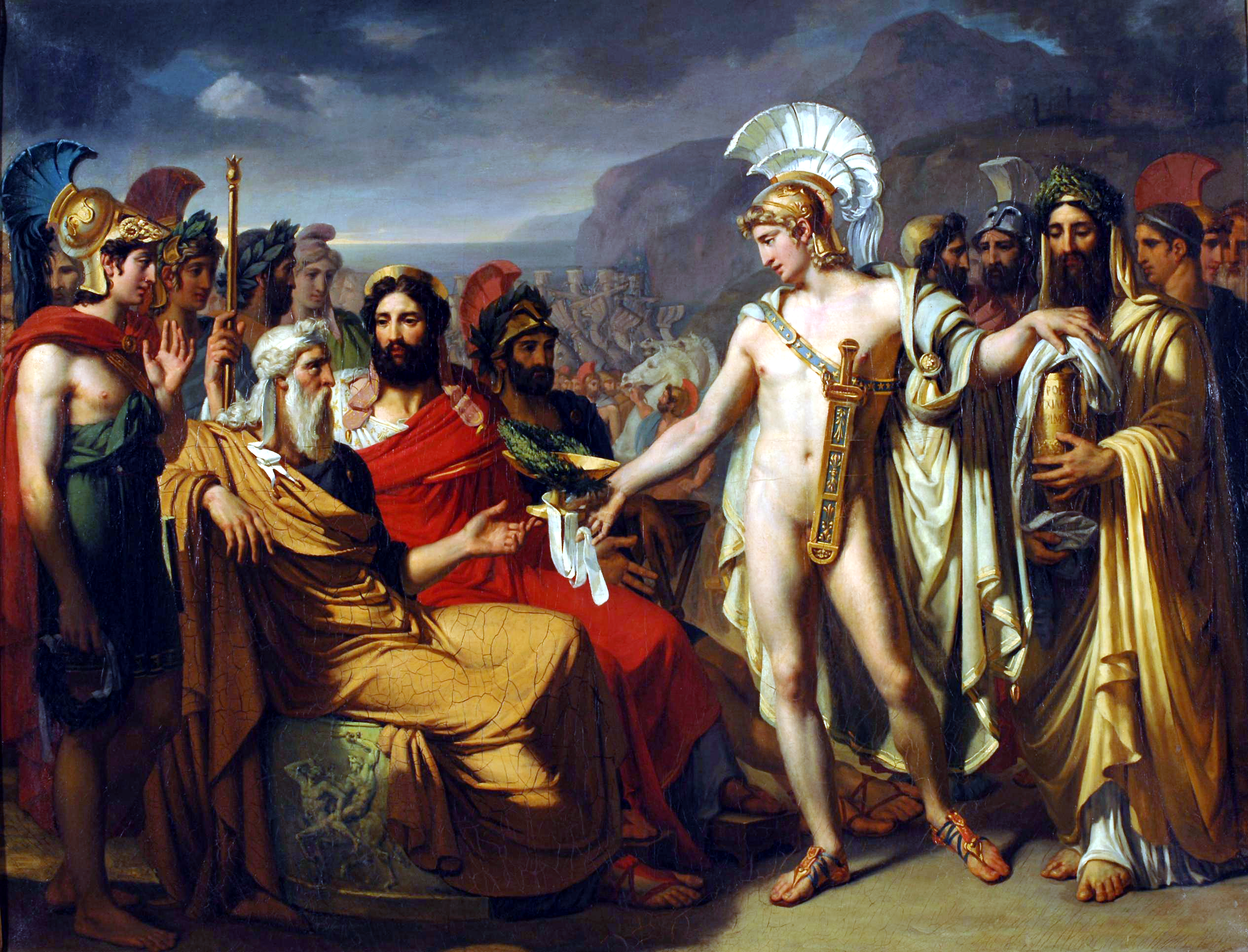
Achilles Introduced to Nestor, 1820

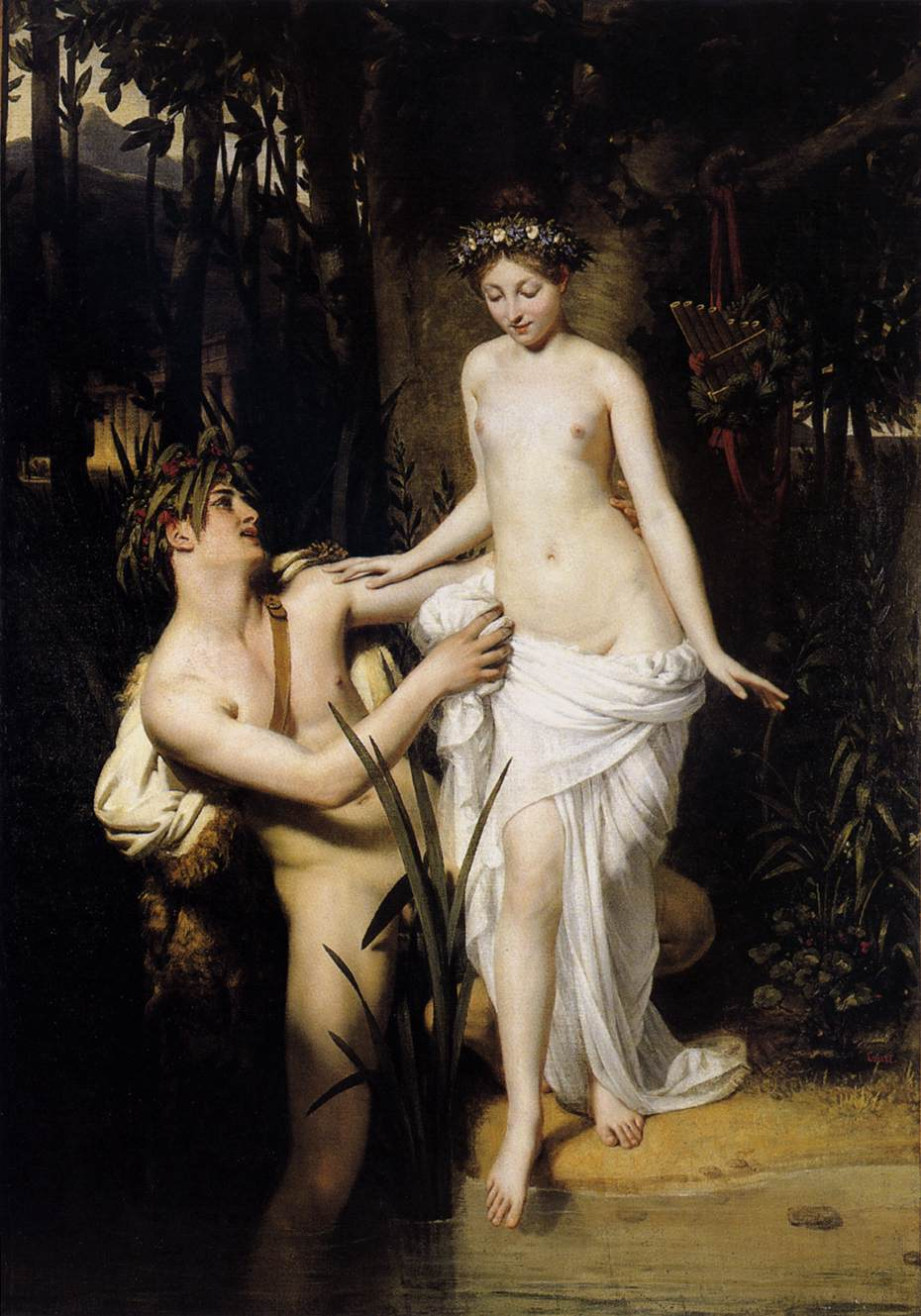
Nymph and Faun bathing, 1824

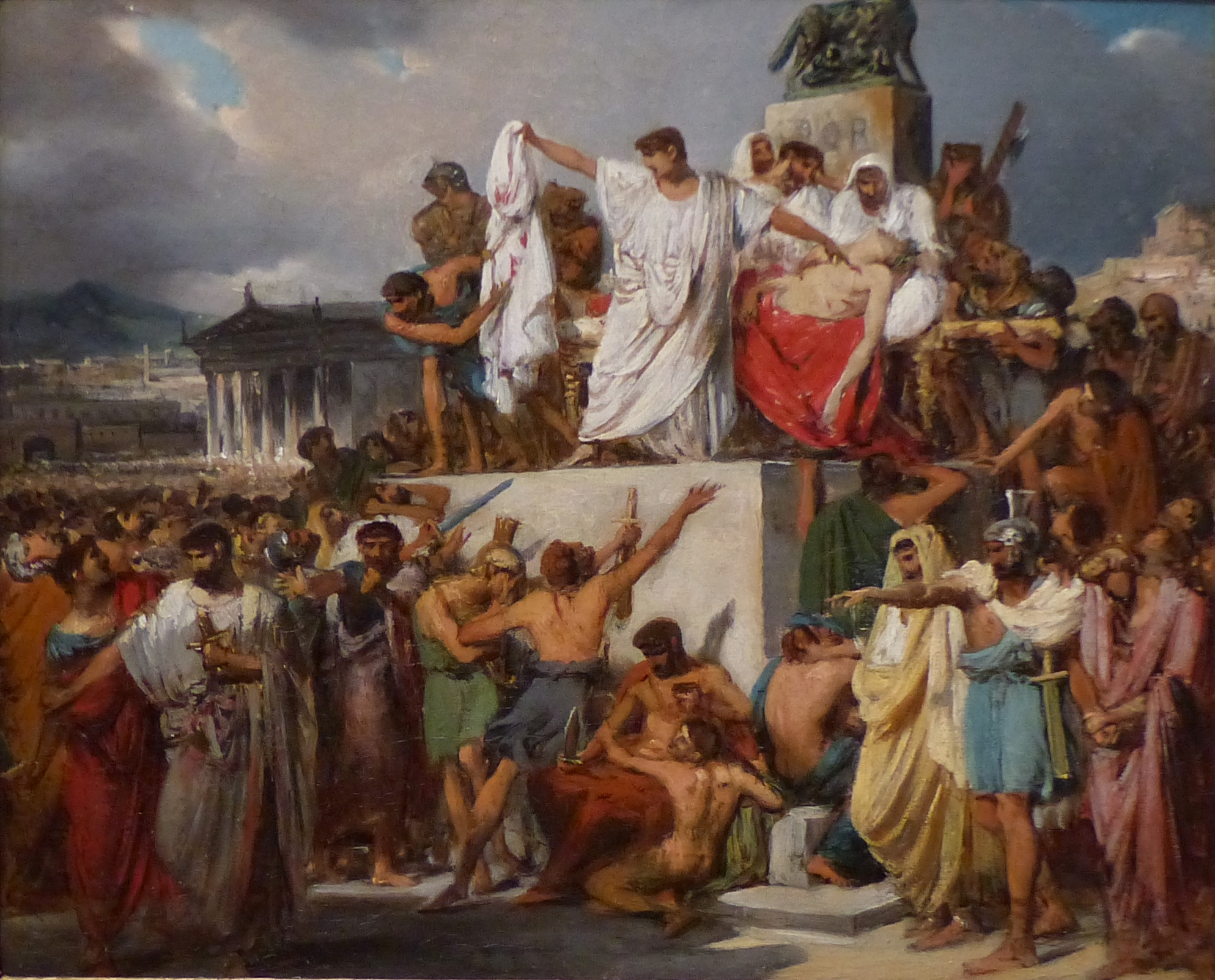
The Death of Caesar, 1827

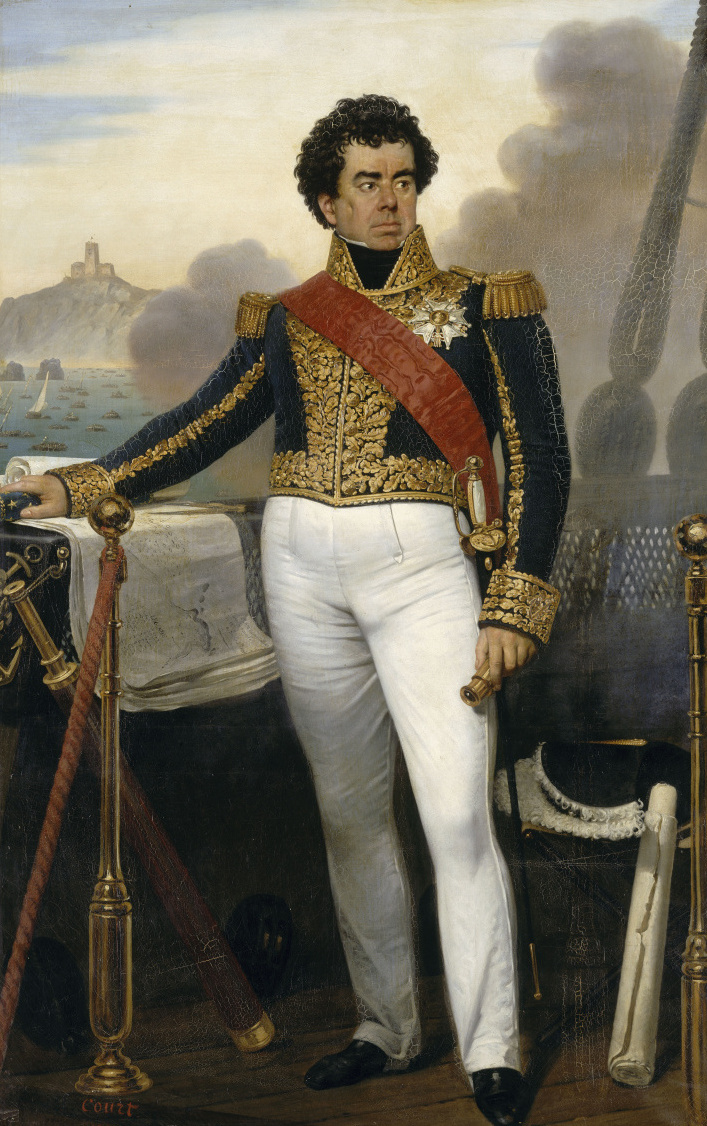
Guy-Victor Duperré, 1832

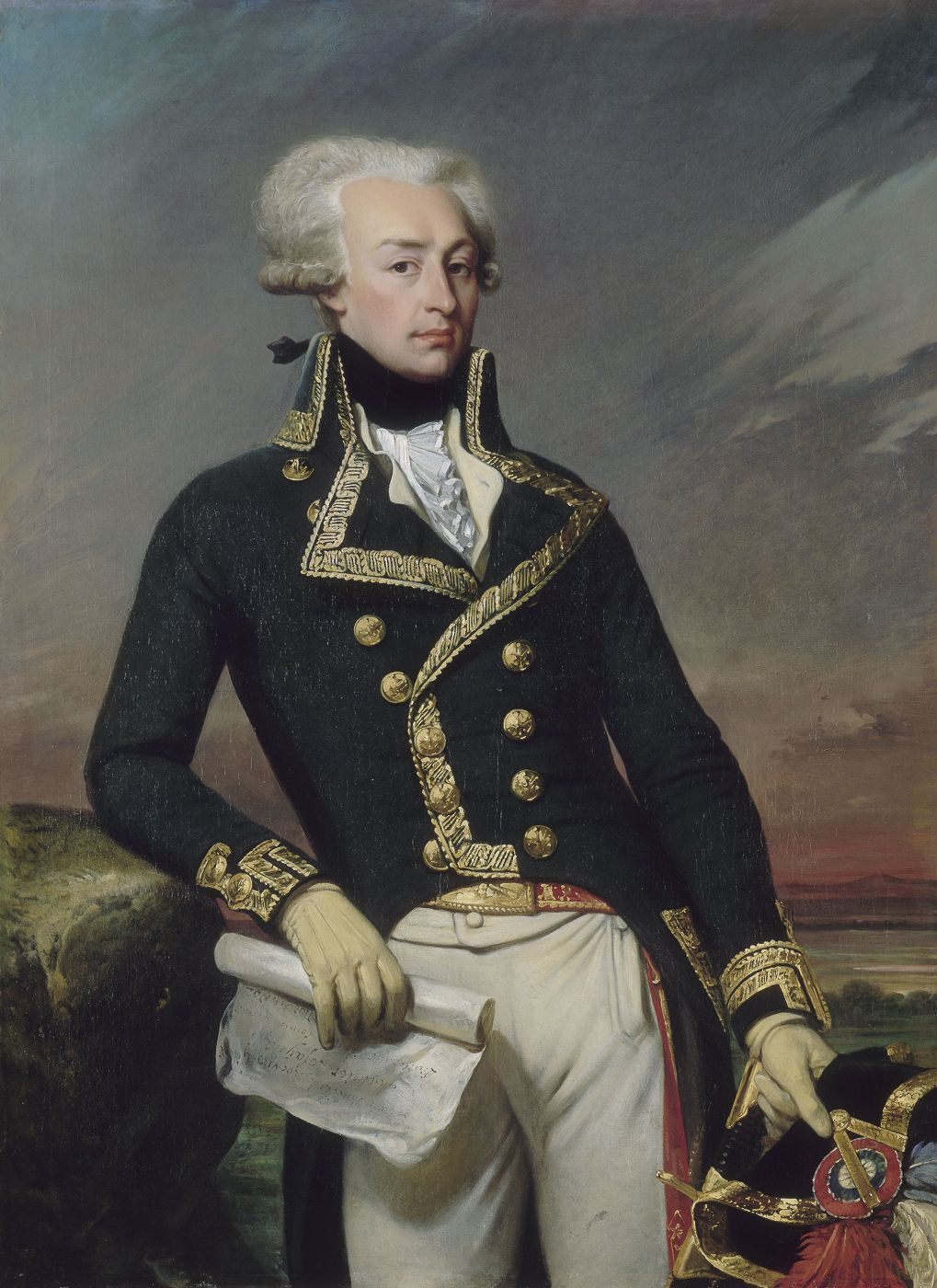
Portrait of the Marquis de Lafayette as a Lieutenant General in 1791, 1834

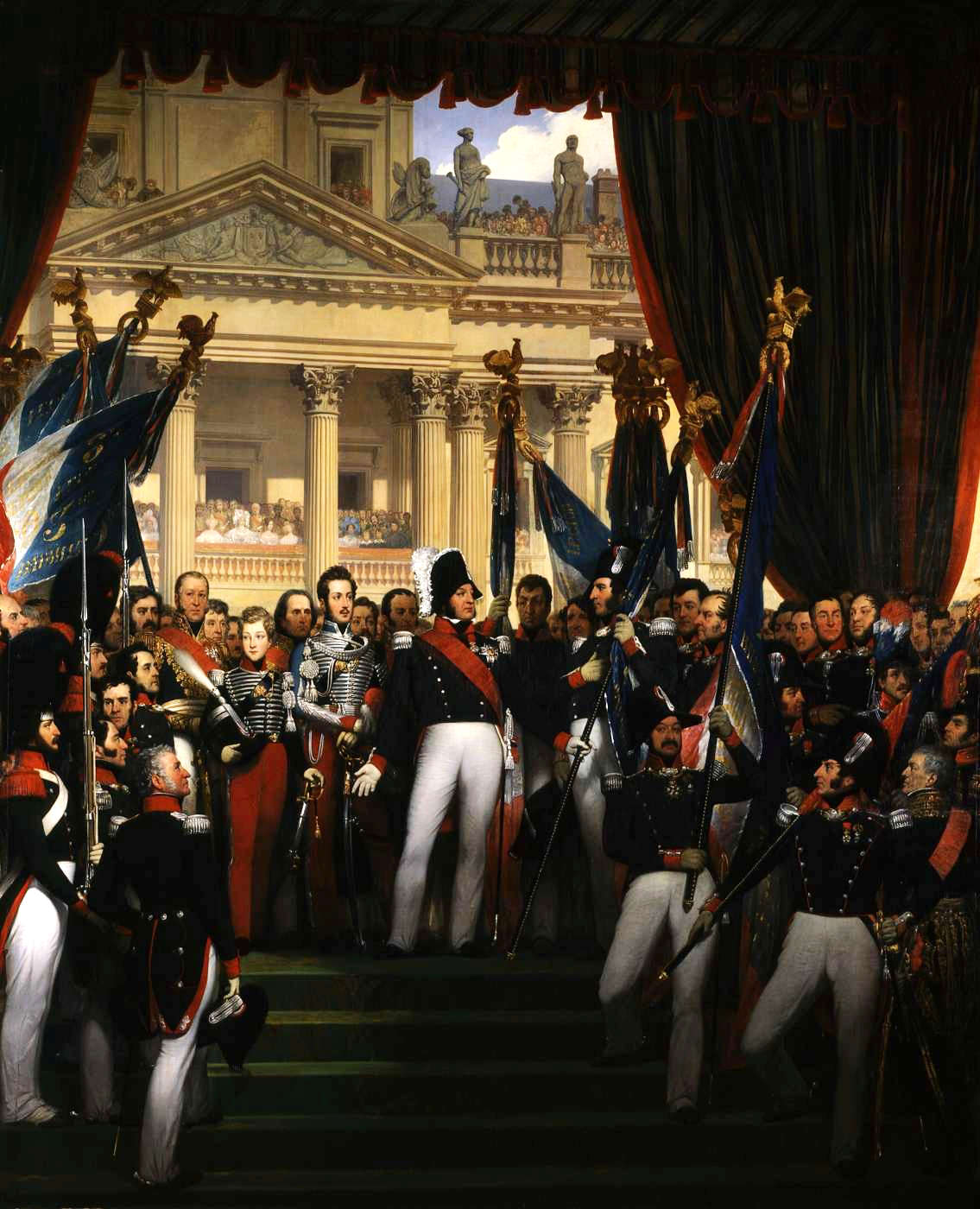
The King Distributing Battalion Standards to the National Guard, 1836

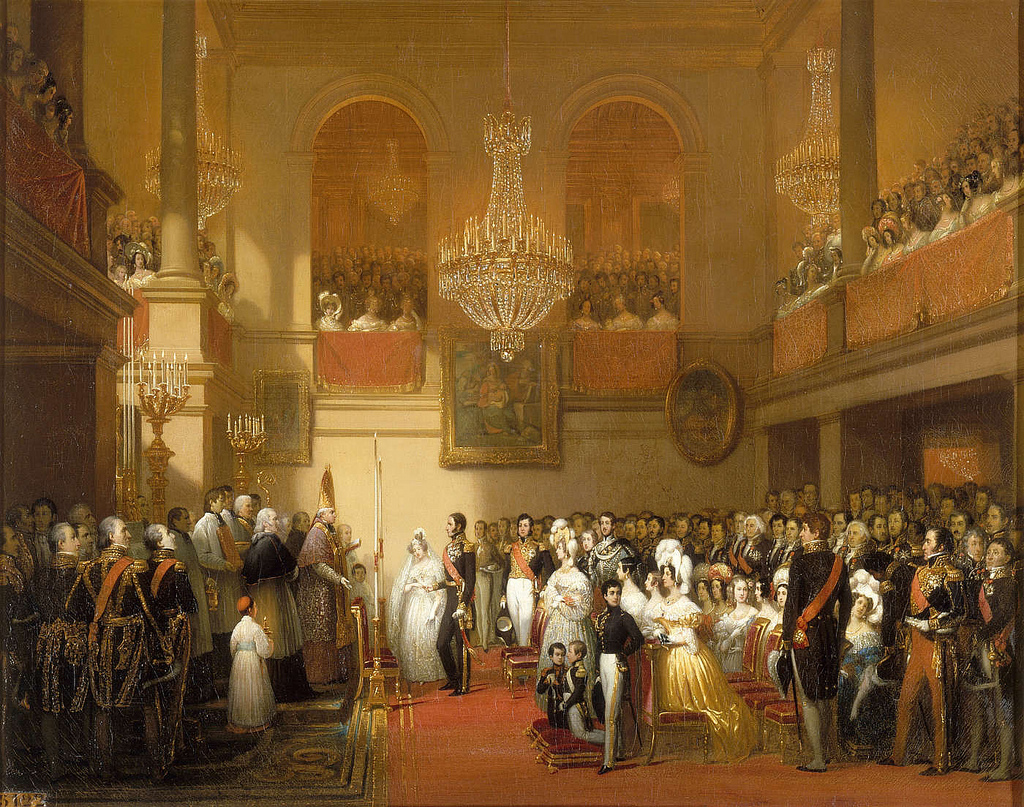
The Wedding of Leopold I of Belgium and Louise of Orléans, 1837

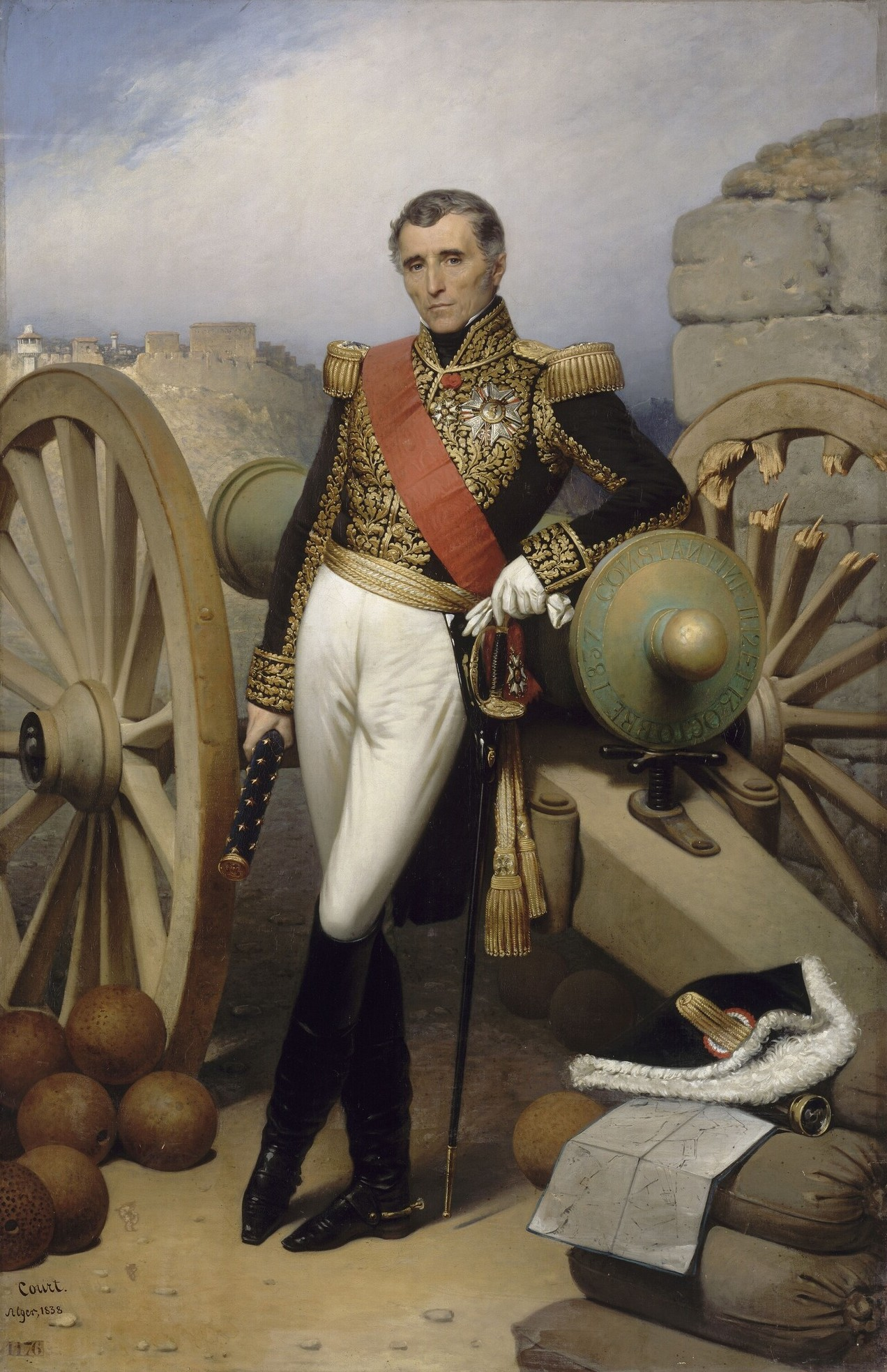
Portrait of Sylvain Charles Valée, 1838

Young Swiss Woman from Brientz, 1839

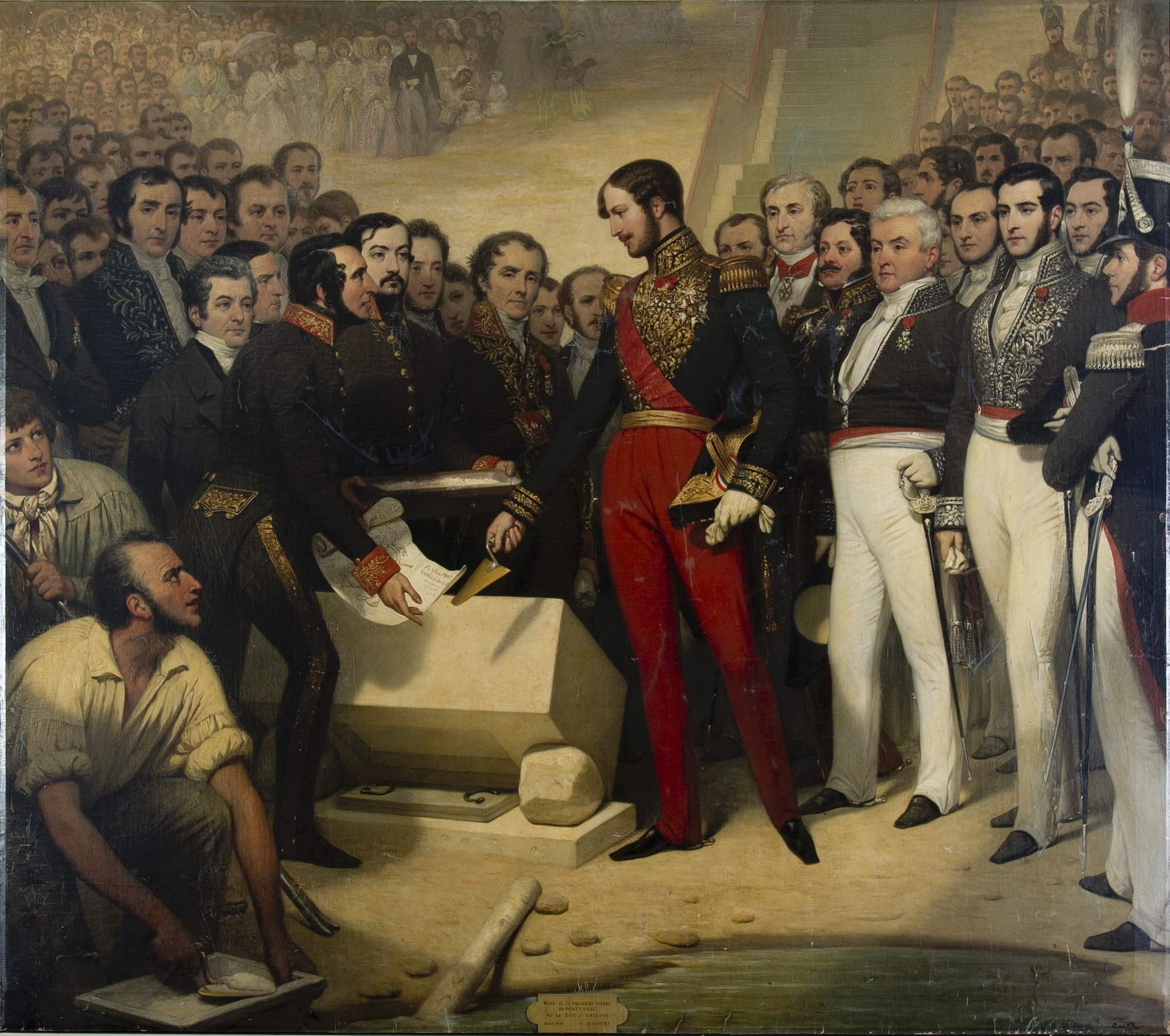
The Duke of Orléans Laying the First Stone of the Pont-Canal, 1840

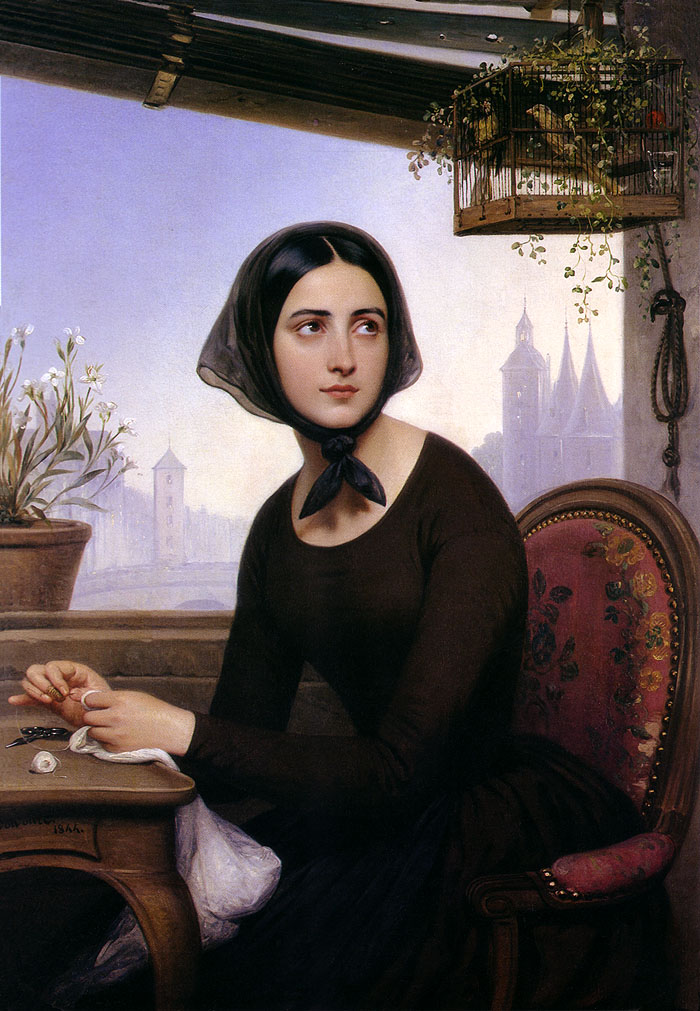
Rigolette keeping herself busy while Germain is away, 1842

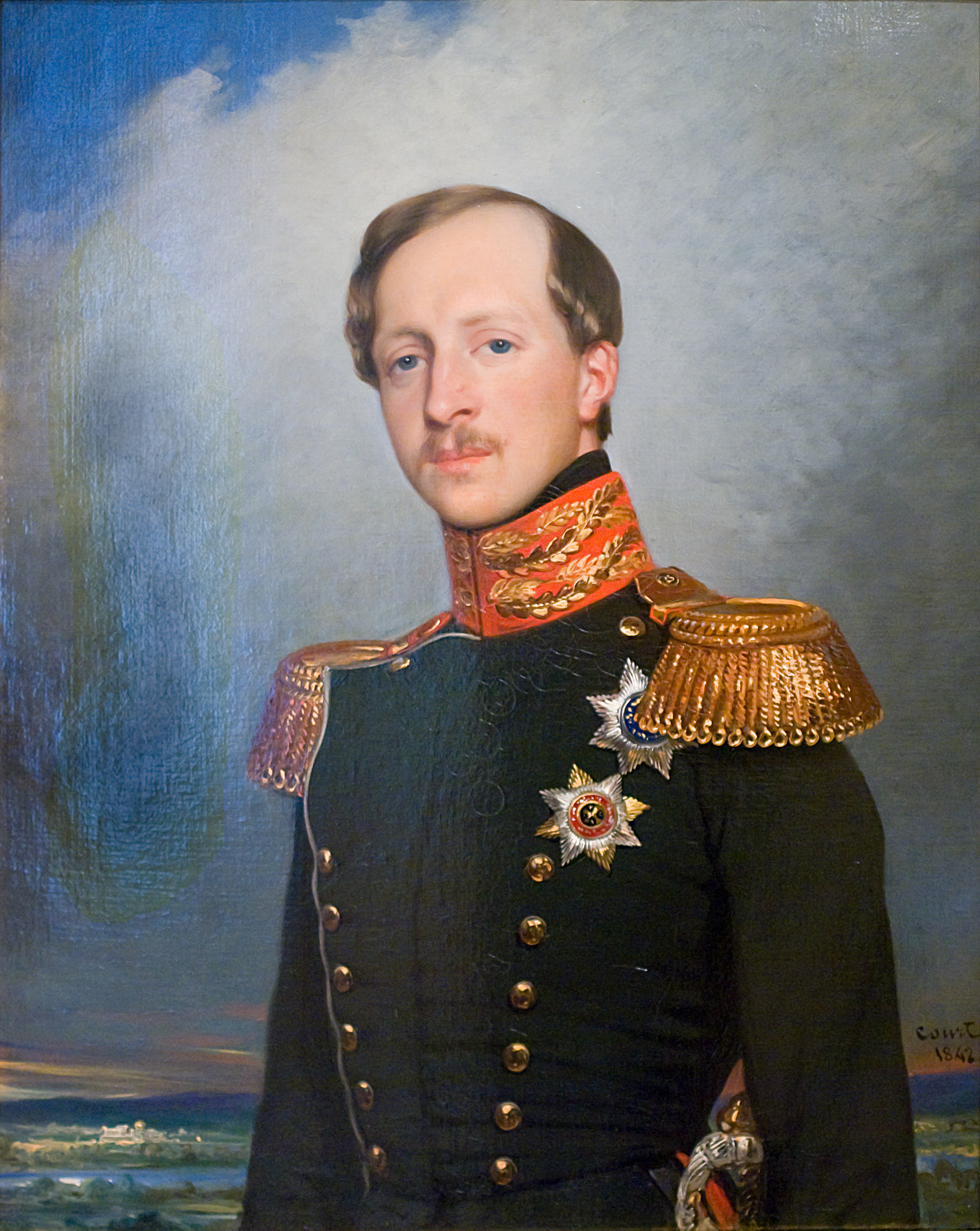
Prince Peter of Oldenburg in the Preobrazhensky Life-Guard Regiment, 1842

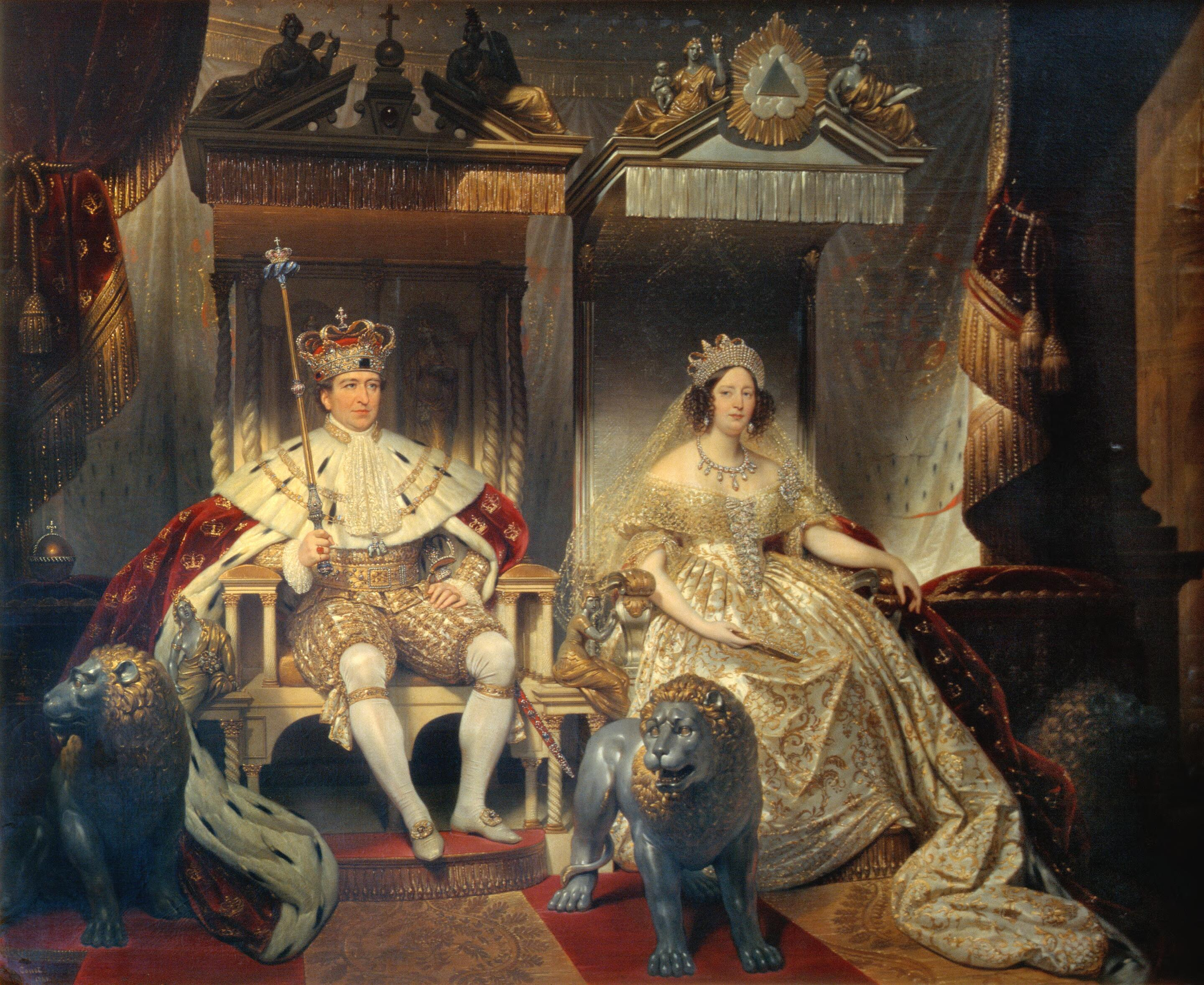
King Christian VIII and Queen Amalie in Their Coronation Robes, 1842

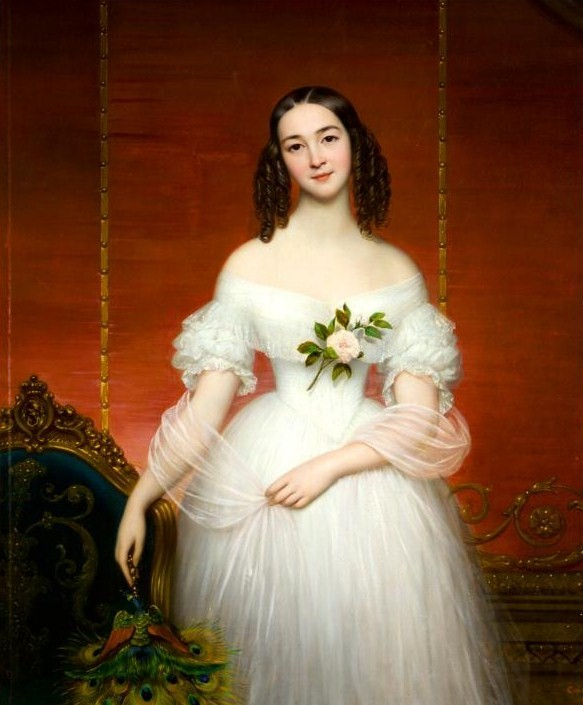
Portrait of Olga Alekseevna Golitsyna (Scherbatova), 1840s

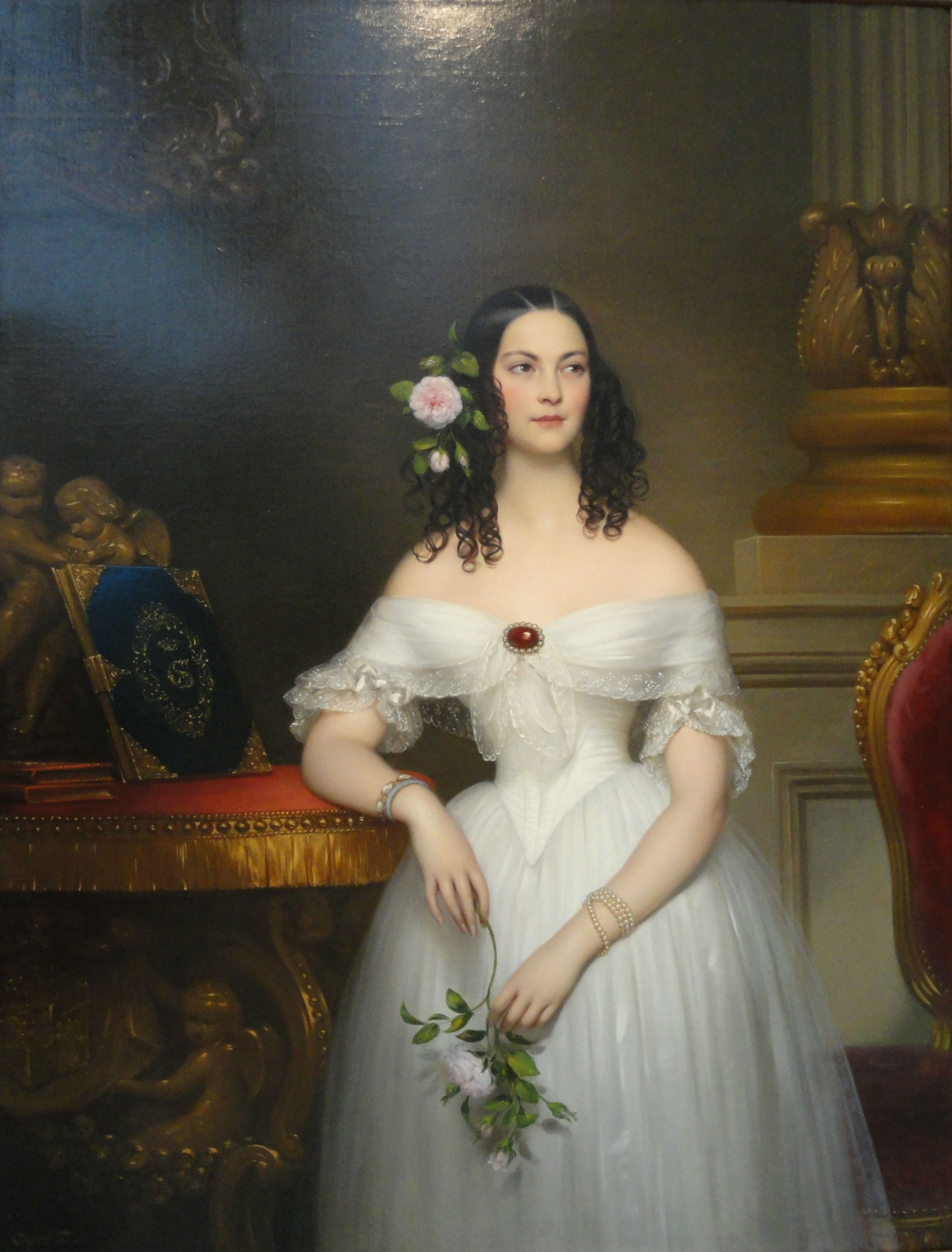
Portrait of Yekaterina Alekseevna Vasilchikova (Scherbatova), 1840s

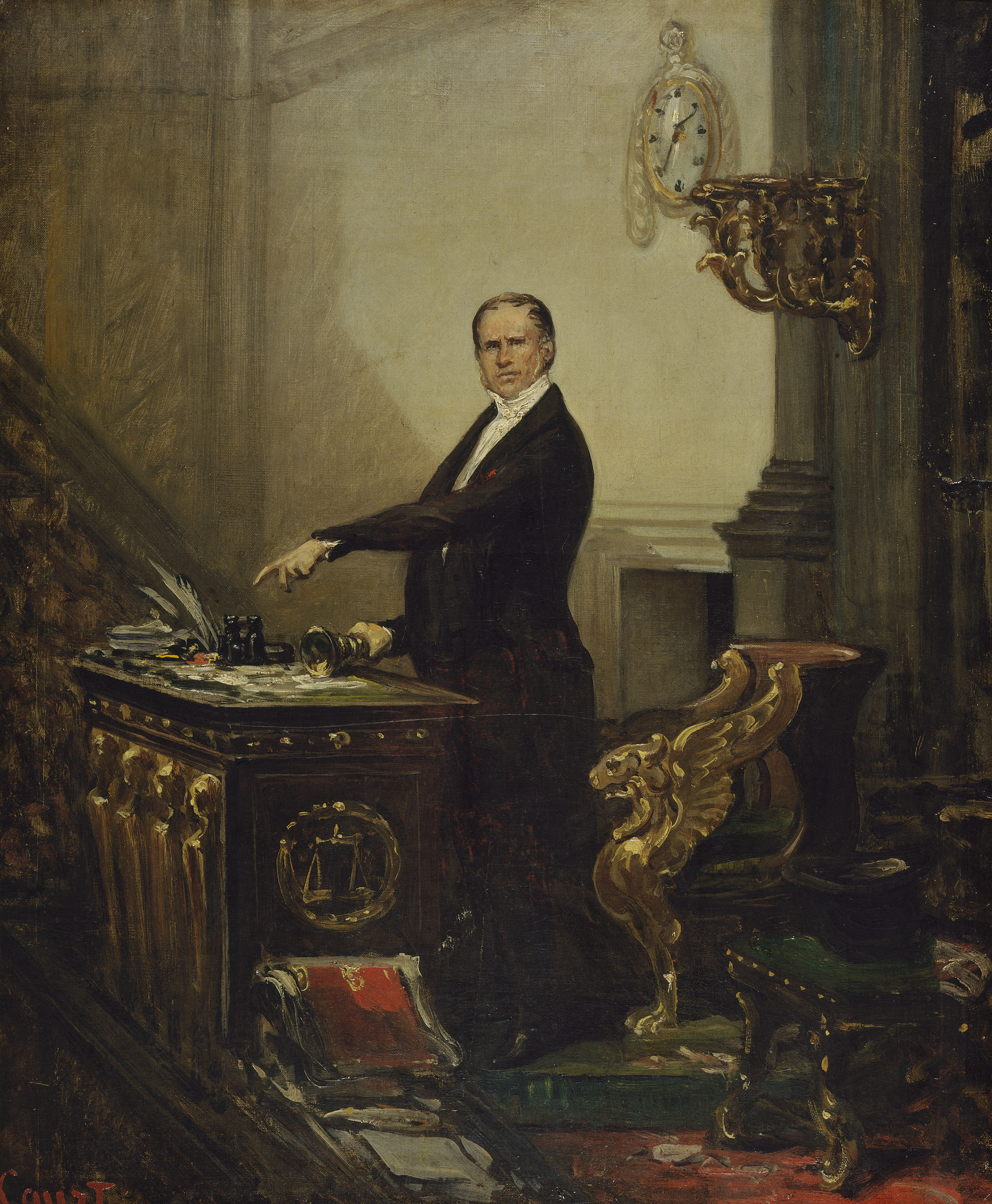
Portrait of André Dupin, 1850
