= Sandringham House =

Country house in Norfolk, England, private home of King Charles III

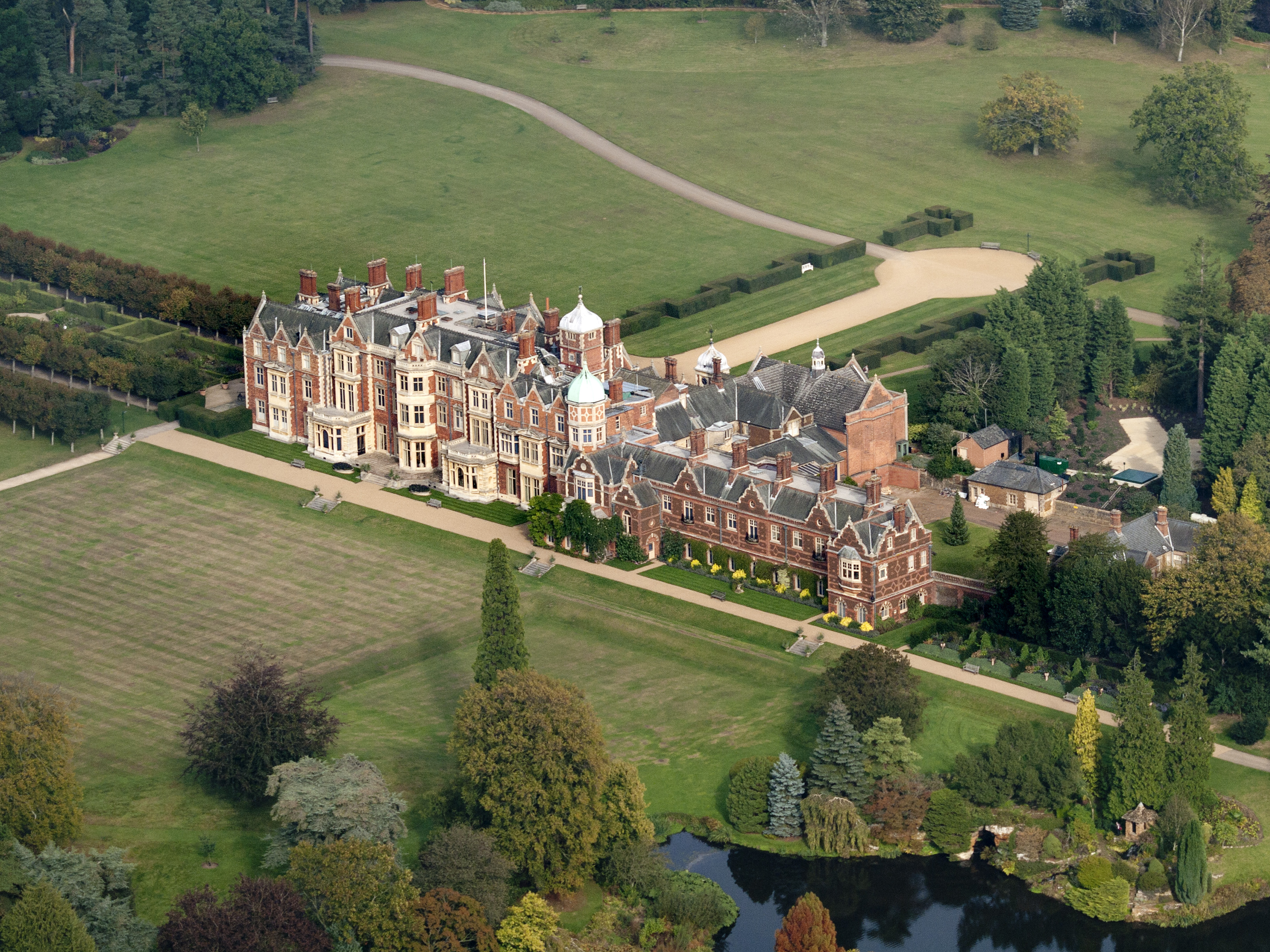
- "The most comfortable house in England"

- Location in Norfolk, England Sandringham House (the United Kingdom)
- 52°49′47″N 0°30′50″E
- Type: Country house
- Location: Near Sandringham, Norfolk, England

History
- Built: 1870–1892
- Built for: Albert Edward, Prince of Wales

Site notes
- Architect(s): A. J. Humbert; Robert William Edis
- Architectural style: Jacobethan
- Owner: Charles III (personally)

National Register of Historic Parks and Gardens
- Official name: Sandringham House
- Type: Grade II*
- Designated: 18 September 1987
- Reference no.: 1001017

Sandringham House is a country house in the parish of Sandringham, Norfolk, England. It is one of the royal residences of Charles III, whose grandfather, George VI, and great-grandfather, George V, both died there. The house stands in a 20,000-acre (8,100 ha) estate in the Norfolk Coast Area of Outstanding Natural Beauty. The house is listed as Grade II* and the landscaped gardens, park and woodlands are on the National Register of Historic Parks and Gardens.

The site has been occupied since Elizabethan times when a large manor house was constructed. This was replaced in 1771 by a Georgian mansion for the owners, the Hoste Henleys. In 1836 Sandringham was bought by John Motteux, a London merchant, who already owned property in Norfolk and Surrey. Motteux had no direct heir, and on his death in 1843, his entire estate was left to Charles Spencer Cowper, the son of Motteux's close friend Emily, Viscountess Palmerston. Cowper sold the other properties and embarked on rebuilding at Sandringham. He had an extravagant lifestyle, and within ten years the estate was mortgaged.

In 1862, Sandringham and just under 8,000 acres (3,200 ha) of land were purchased for £220,000 for Albert Edward, Prince of Wales, (later Edward VII), as a country home for him and his future wife, Princess Alexandra of Denmark. Between 1870 and 1900, the house was almost completely rebuilt in a style described by Pevsner as "frenetic Jacobean". Albert Edward also developed the estate, creating one of the finest shoots in England. Following his death in 1910, the estate passed to Edward's son and heir, George V, who described the house as "dear old Sandringham, the place I love better than anywhere else in the world". It was the setting for the first royal Christmas broadcast in 1932. George died at the house on 20 January 1936. The estate passed to his son Edward VIII and, at his abdication, as the private property of the monarch, it was purchased by Edward's brother, George VI. George was as devoted to the house as his father, writing to his mother Queen Mary, "I have always been so happy here and I love the place". He died at Sandringham on 6 February 1952.

On the King's death, Sandringham passed to his daughter Elizabeth II. Elizabeth II spent about two months each winter on the Sandringham Estate, including the anniversary of her father's death and of her own accession in early February. In 1957, she broadcast her first televised Christmas message from Sandringham. In the 1960s, plans were drawn up to demolish the house and replace it with a modern building, but these were not carried out. In 1977, to mark her Silver Jubilee, Elizabeth II opened the house and grounds to the public for the first time. Unlike the royal palaces owned by the Crown, such as Buckingham Palace, Holyrood Palace and Windsor Castle, Sandringham (alongside Balmoral Castle in Scotland) is owned personally by the monarch. In 2022, following Elizabeth II's death, Sandringham passed to her son and heir, Charles III.

== History ==
=== Early history ===
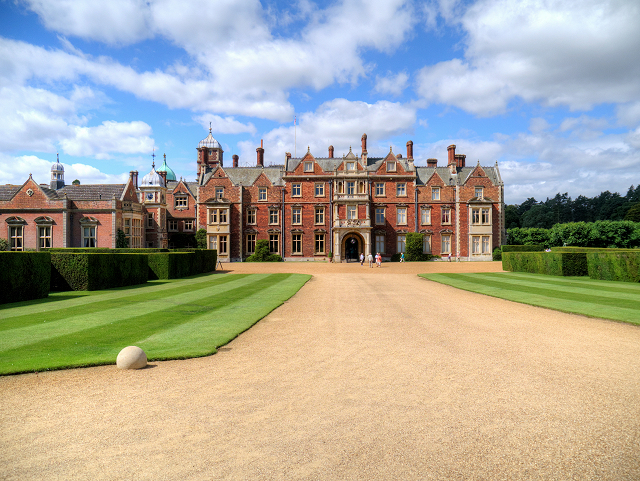
The East front

Sandringham is recorded in the Domesday Book of 1086 as "sant-Dersingham" (the sandy part of Dersingham) and the land was awarded to a Norman knight, Robert Fitz-Corbun, after the Norman Conquest. The local antiquarian Claude Messent, in his study The Architecture on the Royal Estate of Sandringham, records the discovery of evidence of the pavements of a Roman villa near Appleton farm. In the 15th century it was held by Anthony Woodville, Lord Scales, brother-in-law to Edward IV. In the Elizabethan era a manor was built on the site of the present house, which, by the 18th century, came into the possession of the Hoste Henley family, descendants of Dutch refugees. In 1771 Cornish Henley cleared the site to build a Georgian mansion, Sandringham Hall.

In 1834, Henry Hoste Henley died without issue, and the estate was bought at auction by John Motteux, a London merchant. Motteux was also without heirs and bequeathed Sandringham, together with another Norfolk estate and a property in Surrey, to the third son of his close friend, Emily Lamb, the wife of Lord Palmerston. At the time of his inheritance in 1843, Charles Spencer Cowper was a bachelor diplomat, resident in Paris. On succeeding to Motteux's estates, he sold the other properties and divided his time between Sandringham, London and Paris. He undertook extensions to the hall, employing Samuel Sanders Teulon to add an elaborate porch and conservatory. Cowper mortgaged the estate for £89,000 to fund his extravagant lifestyle. He met and married Harriet d'Orsay, daughter of Charles Gardiner, 1st Earl of Blessington, in 1852, and the couple moved into Sandringham House to start a family. The death in 1854, from cholera, of their only child Mary Harriette, led them to spend most of their time abroad, mainly in Paris. By the early 1860s Cowper was keen to sell the estate.

=== Edward VII ===
In 1861 Queen Victoria's eldest son and heir, Albert Edward, the future King Edward VII, was approaching his twentieth birthday. Edward's dissipated lifestyle had been disappointing to his parents, and his father, Prince Albert, thought that marriage and the purchase of a suitable establishment were necessary to ground the prince in country life and pursuits and lessen the influence of the "Marlborough House set" (Note: The Marlborough House set consisted of a group of Edward's friends, many of whose backgrounds or Jewish religion made them socially unacceptable in mid-Victorian England. The Countess of Warwick, a mistress of Edward, recalled her class's dislike of the Prince's many Jewish friends: "We resented the introduction of the Jews into the social circle of the Prince of Wales ... because they had brains. As a class, we did not like brains.") with which he was involved. Albert had his staff investigate 18 possible country estates that might be suitable, including Newstead Abbey in Nottinghamshire and Houghton Hall in Norfolk. The need to act quickly was reinforced by the Nellie Clifden affair, when Edward's fellow officers smuggled the actress into his quarters. The possibility of a scandal was deeply concerning to his parents. Sandringham Hall was on the list of the estates considered, and a personal recommendation to the Prince Consort from the prime minister Lord Palmerston, stepfather to the owner, swayed Prince Albert. Negotiations were only slightly delayed by Albert's death in December 1861—his widow declared, "His wishes – his plans – about everything are to be my law". Edward visited in February 1862, and a sale was agreed for the house and just under 8,000 acres (3,200 ha) of land, which was finalised that October. Queen Victoria only twice visited the house she had paid for. (Note: The architectural historian John Cornforth suggests that the purchase was funded by the Prince himself, "out of the capital skilfully built up for him during his minority by his father". A. N. Wilson, in his biography of Queen Victoria, is clear that the Queen paid the bill.) Over the course of the next forty years, and with considerable expenditure, Edward was to create a house and country estate that his friend Charles Carington called "the most comfortable in England".

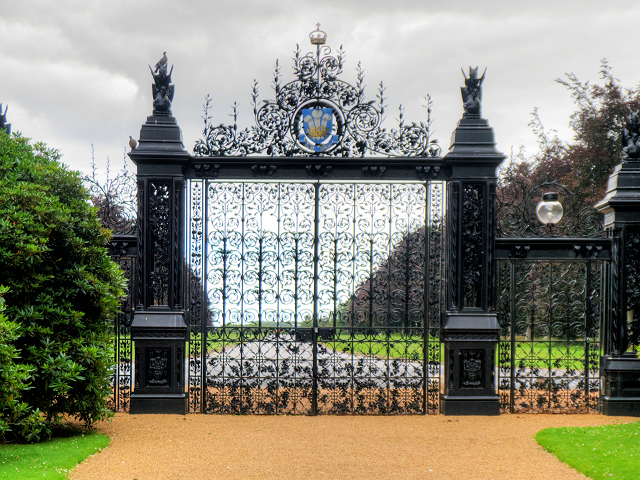
The Norwich Gates – a wedding present to Edward and Alexandra from the gentry of Norfolk

The price paid for Sandringham, £220,000, has been described as "exorbitant". (Note: While exact comparisons are difficult, the Bank of England's inflation calculator suggests a 2017 equivalent value in the order of £25m.) This is questioned by Helen Walch, author of the estate's recent (2012) history, who shows the detailed analysis undertaken by the Prince Consort's advisers and suggests that the cost was reasonable. However, the house was soon found to be too small to accommodate the Prince of Wales's establishment following his marriage in March 1863 and the many guests he wished to entertain. In 1865, two years after moving in, the prince commissioned A. J. Humbert to raze the original hall and create a much larger building. (Note: Humbert's involvement may have begun somewhat earlier. A pencil study dated circa 1862, shows a design with a massive new extension, in a Jacobethan style, standing at a right angle to the 18th-century hall.) Humbert was an architect favoured by the royal family—"for no good reason", according to the architectural historian Mark Girouard—and had previously undertaken work for Queen Victoria at Osborne House and at Frogmore House. The new red-brick house was complete by late 1870; the only element of the original house of the Henley Hostes and the Cowpers that was retained was the elaborate conservatory designed by Teulon in the 1830s. Edward had this room converted into a billiard room. A plaque in the entrance hall records that "This house was built by Albert Edward Prince of Wales and Alexandra his wife in the year of our Lord 1870". The building was entered through a large porte-cochère straight into the main living room (the saloon), an arrangement that was subsequently found to be inconvenient. The house provided living and sleeping accommodation over three storeys, with attics and a basement. The Norfolk countryside surrounding the house appealed to Alexandra, as it reminded her of her native Denmark.

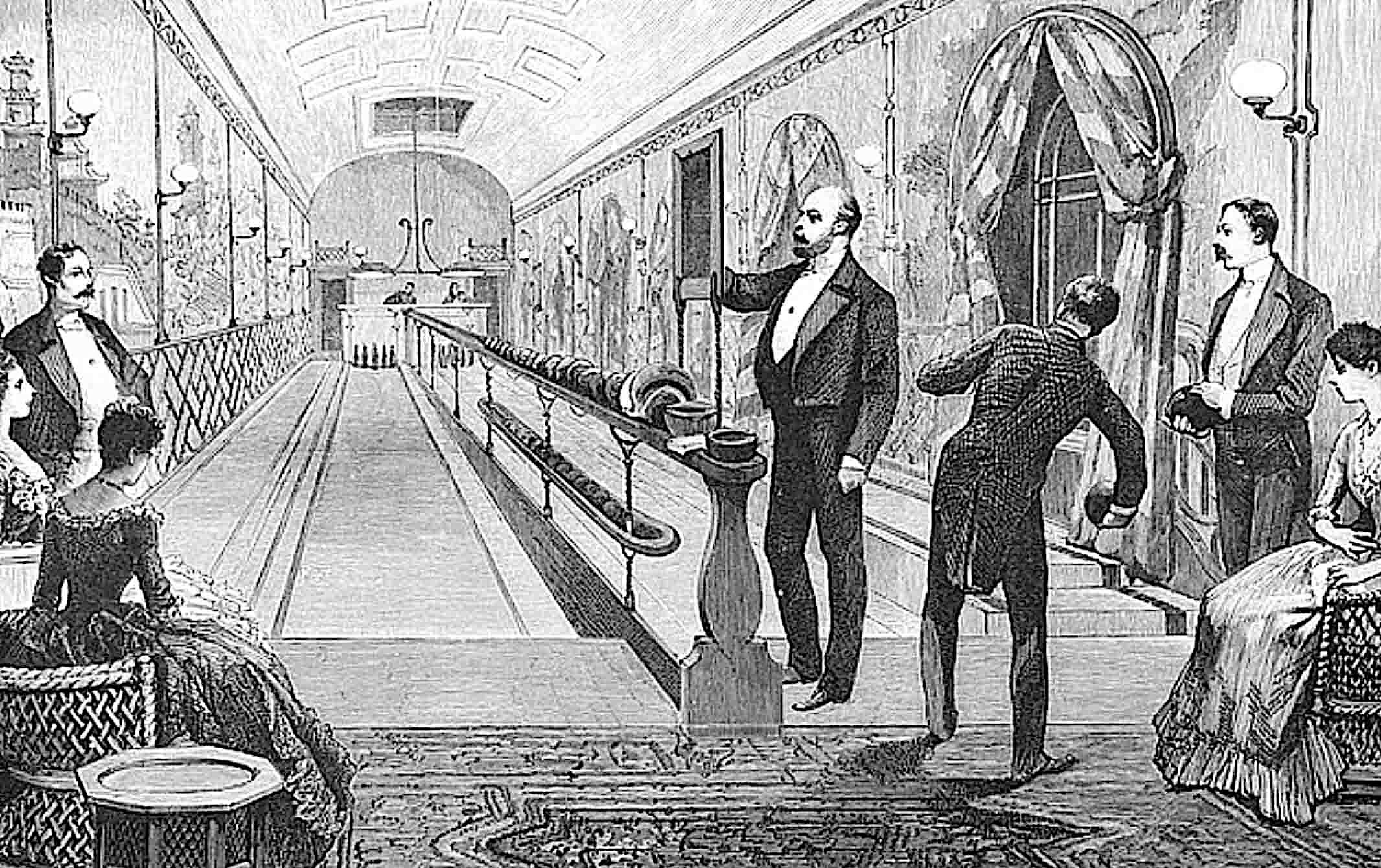
1888 print of Albert Edward bowling at Sandringham House

Within a decade, the house was again found to be too small, and in 1883 a new extension, the Bachelors' Wing, was constructed to the designs of a Norfolk architect, Colonel R. W. Edis. Edis also built a new billiard room and converted the old conservatory into a bowling alley. The Prince of Wales had been impressed by one he had seen at Trentham Hall in Staffordshire, and the alley at Sandringham was modelled on an example from Rumpenheim Castle, Germany. In 1891, during preparations for Edward's fiftieth birthday, a serious fire broke out when maids lit all the fires in the second-floor bedrooms to warm them in advance of the prince's arrival. (Note: The damage, through the collapse of the roof and by smoke and water, was considerable, but Humbert's efforts during construction to make the house fire-proof, combined with the actions of the estate fire brigade, averted greater loss.) Edis was recalled to undertake rebuilding and further construction. As he had with the Bachelors' Wing, Edis tried to harmonise these additions with Humbert's house by following the original Jacobethan style, and by using matching brickwork and Ketton stone.

The house was up to date in its facilities, with the modern kitchens and lighting using gas from the estate's own plant and water being supplied from the Appleton Water Tower, constructed at the highest point on the estate. The tower was designed in an Italianate style by Robert Rawlinson, and Alexandra laid the foundation stone in 1877. (Note: Both Pevsner and Messent record the Appleton Water Tower as being designed by Martin ffolkes, a civil engineer and friend of the prince who lived at Hillington near Sandringham. The tower, now restored, is managed by the Landmark Trust.) The Prince's efforts as a country gentleman were approved by the press of the day; a contemporary newspaper expressed a wish to "Sandringhamize Marlborough House – as a landlord, agriculturist and country gentleman, the Prince sets an example which might be followed with advantage".

The royal couple's developments at Sandringham were not confined to the house; over the course of their occupation, the wider estate was also transformed. Ornamental and kitchen gardens were established, employing more than 100 gardeners at their peak. Many estate buildings were constructed, including cottages for staff, kennels, a school, a rectory and a staff clubhouse, the Babingley. Edward also made Sandringham one of the best sporting estates in England to provide a setting for the elaborate weekend shooting parties that became Sandringham's defining rationale. To increase the amount of daylight available during the shooting season, which ran from October to February, the prince introduced the tradition of Sandringham time, whereby all the clocks on the estate were set half an hour ahead of GMT. This tradition was maintained until 1936. (Note: The clocks were reset to Greenwich Mean Time during the two visits to the house made by Queen Victoria who considered the practice "a wicked lie".) Edward's entertaining was legendary, and the scale of the slaughter of game birds, predominantly pheasants and partridges, was colossal. The meticulously maintained game books recorded annual bags of between 6,000 and 8,000 birds in the 1870s, rising to bags of more than 20,000 a year by 1900. The game larder, constructed for the storage of the carcasses, was inspired by that at Holkham Hall and was the largest in Europe. (Note: Edward's addiction to shooting led to friction with the tenant farmers on the Sandringham estate. They were forbidden from shooting rabbits and hares, a privilege reserved for the prince's guests. The consequent damage caused to the farmers' crops was compensated for by the estate paying "game damages". One tenant, Louisa Mary Cresswell, who farmed at Appleton, recorded her fifteen-year feud with estate staff in a memoir Eighteen Years on Sandringham Estate, published under the pseudonym 'The Lady Farmer' in 1877.)

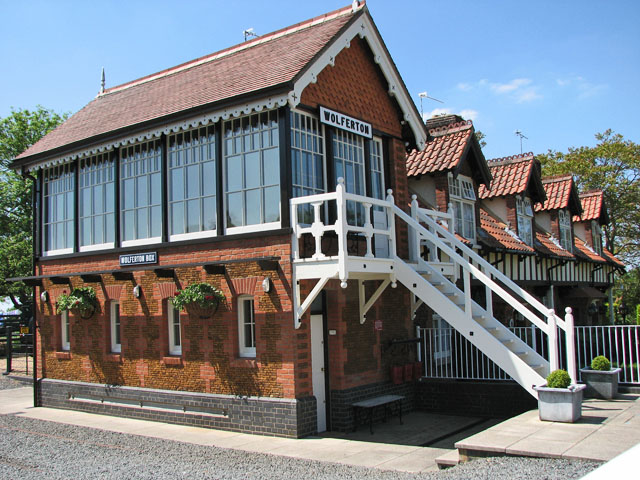
Wolferton Station, now closed – it was used by the royal family and their guests to reach Sandringham House for over 100 years

Guests for Sandringham house parties generally arrived at Wolferton railway station, 2.5 miles (4 km) from the house, travelling in royal trains that ran from St Pancras Station to King's Lynn and then on to Wolferton. The station served the house from 1862 until its closure in 1969. Thereafter, the Queen and others staying at the house generally travelled by car from King's Lynn. Edward established the Sandringham stud in 1897, achieving considerable success with the racehorses Persimmon and Diamond Jubilee. Neither his son nor his grandsons evinced as much interest in horses, although the stud was maintained; however, his great-granddaughter, Elizabeth II, tried to match Edward's equestrian achievements and bred several winners at the Sandringham Stud.

On 14 January 1892, Edward's eldest son and heir, Prince Albert Victor, Duke of Clarence and Avondale, died of pneumonia at the house. He is commemorated in the clock tower, which bears an inscription in Latin that translates as "the hours perish and will be charged to our account".

=== George V ===
In his will Edward VII left his widow £200,000 and a lifetime interest in the Sandringham estate. Queen Alexandra's continued occupancy of the "big house" compelled George V, his wife, Queen Mary, and their expanding family to remain at York Cottage in the grounds, in rather "cramped" conditions. Suggestions from courtiers that Queen Alexandra might move out were firmly rebuffed by the King; "It is my mother's house, my father built it for her". The King also lacked the sociability of his father, and the shortage of space at York Cottage enabled him to limit the entertaining he undertook, with the small rooms reportedly reminding him of the onboard cabins of his naval career.

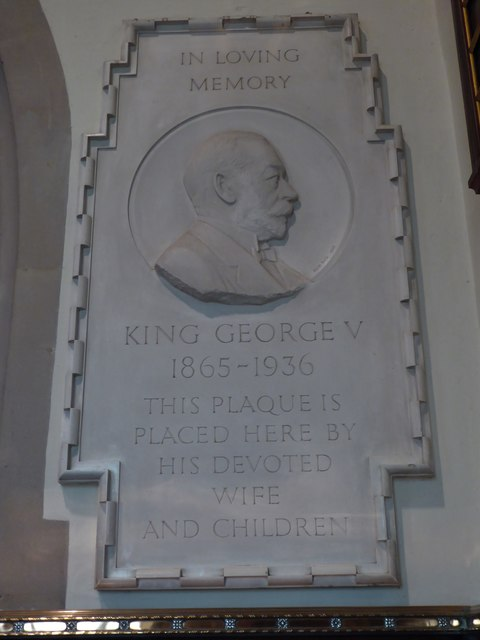
Memorial plaque to George V in the Church of St Mary Magdalene

The new King's primary interests, aside from his constitutional duties, were shooting and stamp collecting. (Note: James Lees-Milne, biographer of Harold Nicolson, who was in turn the biographer of George V, recorded Nicolson's despair at how he would cover the period in the King's life between his retirement from the Navy and his accession: "How was he to deal with the long blank of the King's life...? During this time the Prince, as he then was, merely shot partridges and stuck stamps into albums. For seventeen years ...he did absolutely nothing worthwhile at all".) He was considered one of the best shots in England, and his collections of shotguns and stamps were among the finest in the world. (Note: John Betjeman referenced both, and Sandringham House, in the first stanza of his poem, The Death of King George V: Spirit of well-shot woodcock, partridge, snipe Flutter and bear him up the Norfolk sky: In that red house in a red mahogany bookcase The stamp collection waits with mounts long dry.) Deeply conservative by nature, George sought to maintain the traditions of Sandringham estate life established by his father, and life at York Cottage provided respite from the constitutional and political struggles that overshadowed the early years of George's reign. Even greater upheaval was occasioned by the outbreak of the First World War, a dynastic struggle that involved many of his relatives, including the German Kaiser and the Russian Emperor, both of whom had previously been guests at Sandringham. (Note: The Kaiser's visit, in November 1902, was neither a social nor a political success, King Edward commenting on his guest's departure, "Thank God he's gone".) The estate and village of Sandringham suffered a major loss when all but two members of the King's Own Sandringham Company, a territorial unit of the Fifth Battalion of the Royal Norfolk Regiment, were killed at Suvla Bay during the Gallipoli Campaign. The story of the battalion was the subject of a BBC drama, All the King's Men. A memorial to the dead was raised on the estate; the names of those killed in the Second World War were added subsequently.

Following Queen Alexandra's death at Sandringham on 20 November 1925, the King and his family moved to the main house. In 1932, George V gave the first of the royal Christmas messages from a studio erected at Sandringham. The speech, written by Rudyard Kipling, began, "I speak now from my home and from my heart to you all". George V died in his bedroom at Sandringham at 11:55 p.m. on 20 January 1936, his death hastened by injections of morphine and cocaine, to maintain the King's dignity and to enable the announcement of his death to be made in the following day's Times. The King's body was moved to St Mary Magdalene's Church, a scene described by the late King's assistant private secretary, "Tommy" Lascelles. "Next evening we took him over to the little church at the end of the garden. We saw the lych-gate brilliantly lit [and] the guardsmen slung the coffin on their shoulders and laid it before the altar. After a brief service, we left it, to be watched over by the men of the Sandringham Estate." Two days later, George's body was transported by train from Wolferton to London, and to its lying in state at Westminster Hall.

=== Edward VIII ===
On the night of his father's death, Edward VIII ordered the clocks at Sandringham be returned to Greenwich Mean Time, ending the tradition of Sandringham time that his grandfather had begun more than 50 years earlier. Edward had rarely enjoyed his visits to Sandringham, either in his father's time or that of his grandfather. He described a typical dinner at the house in a letter to his then mistress Freda Dudley Ward, dated 26 December 1919; "it's too dull and boring for words. Christ how any human beings can ever have got themselves into this pompous secluded and monotonous groove I just can't imagine". In another letter, evenings at the "big house"—Edward stayed at York Cottage with his father—were recorded as "sordidly dull and boring". (Note: Edward described Christmases at Sandringham as "Dickens in a Cartier setting".) His antipathy to the house was unlikely to have been lessened by his late father's will, which was read to the family in the saloon at the house. His brothers were each left £750,000 while Edward was bequeathed no monetary assets beyond the revenues from the Duchy of Cornwall. A codicil also prevented him from selling the late King's personal possessions; Lascelles described the inheritance as "the Kingship without the cash". (Note: Lascelles's final verdict on the man he had served as Prince of Wales and King was damning, "I wasted the best years of my life in (his) service".)

Edward's concerns regarding his income led him immediately to focus on the expense associated with running his late father's private homes. Sandringham he described as a "voracious white elephant", and he asked his brother, the Duke of York, to undertake a review of the management of the estate, which had been costing his father £50,000 (equivalent to £3,055,000 in 2025) annually in subsidies at the time of his death. The review recommended significant retrenchments, and its partial implementation caused considerable resentment among the dismissed staff. After the night of his father's death at Sandringham, Edward spent only one further night of his reign at the house, bringing Wallis Simpson for a shooting party in October 1936. The party was interrupted by a request to meet with Prime Minister Stanley Baldwin, and having arrived on a Sunday, the King returned to Fort Belvedere the next day. He never returned to Sandringham; and, his attention diverted by the impending crisis arising from his attachment to Simpson, within two months of his only visit to the house as king, he had abdicated. On his abdication, as Sandringham and Balmoral Castle were the private property of the monarch, it was necessary for King George VI to purchase both properties. The price paid, £300,000 (equivalent to £18,332,000 in 2025), was a cause of friction between the new King and his brother.

=== George VI ===
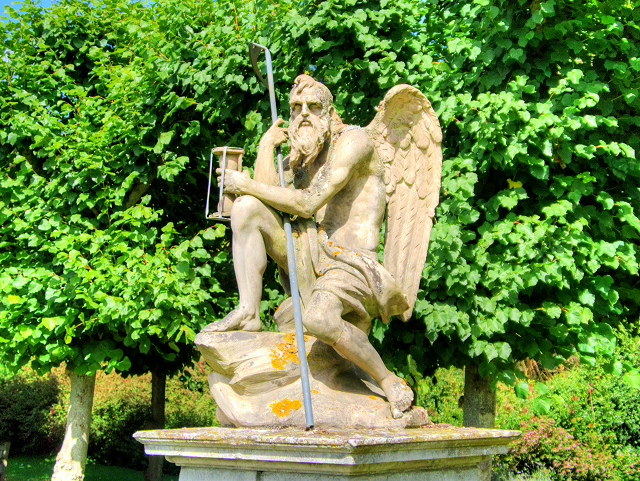
The statue of Father Time, visible from the bedroom in which George VI died, was purchased by his wife, Queen Elizabeth.

George VI had been born at Sandringham on 14 December 1895. A keen follower of country pursuits, he was as devoted to the estate as his father, writing to his mother, Queen Mary, "I have always been so happy here". The deep retrenchment he had proposed when commissioned by his brother to review the estate was not enacted, but economies were still made. His mother was at church at Sandringham on Sunday 3 September 1939, when the outbreak of the Second World War was declared. The house was shut up during the war, but occasional visits were made to the estate, with the family staying at outlying cottages. After the war the King made improvements to the gardens surrounding the house but, as traditionalist as his father, he made few other changes. December 1945 saw the first celebration of Christmas at the house since 1938. Lady Airlie recorded her impressions at dinner: "I sat next to the King. His face was tired and strained and he ate practically nothing. Looking at him I felt the cold fear of the probability of another short reign".

George was a heavy smoker throughout his life and had an operation to remove part of his lung in September 1951. He was never fully well again and died at Sandringham during the early morning of 6 February 1952. He had gone out after hares on 5 February, "shooting conspicuously well", and had planned the next day's shoot before retiring at 10.30 p.m. He was discovered at 7.30 a.m. in his bedroom by his valet, having died of a coronary thrombosis at the age of 56. His body was placed in the Church of St Mary Magdalene, before being taken to Wolferton Station and transported by train to London, to lie in state at Westminster Hall.

=== Elizabeth II ===
As with her predecessors, the house remained one of the two homes owned by the Sovereign in her private capacity, rather than as head of state, the other being Balmoral Castle. Following King George VI's death, Queen Elizabeth II's custom was to spend the anniversary of that and of her own accession privately with her family at Sandringham House, and, toward the end of her reign, to use it as her official base from Christmas until February. (Note: The COVID-19 pandemic led to the Queen's cancellation of her Christmas at Sandringham in both 2020 and 2021.) In celebrating Christmas at Sandringham, the Queen followed the tradition of her last three predecessors, whereas her great-great-grandmother, Queen Victoria, held her celebrations at Windsor Castle. The taxation arrangements of the monarch meant that no inheritance tax was paid on the Sandringham or Balmoral estates when they passed to the Queen, at a time when it was having a deleterious effect on other country estates. On her accession, the Queen asked her husband, the Duke of Edinburgh, to take on the responsibility for the management of the estate. The Duke worked to move towards self-sufficiency, generating additional income streams, taking more of the land in hand, and amalgamating many of the smaller tenant farms.

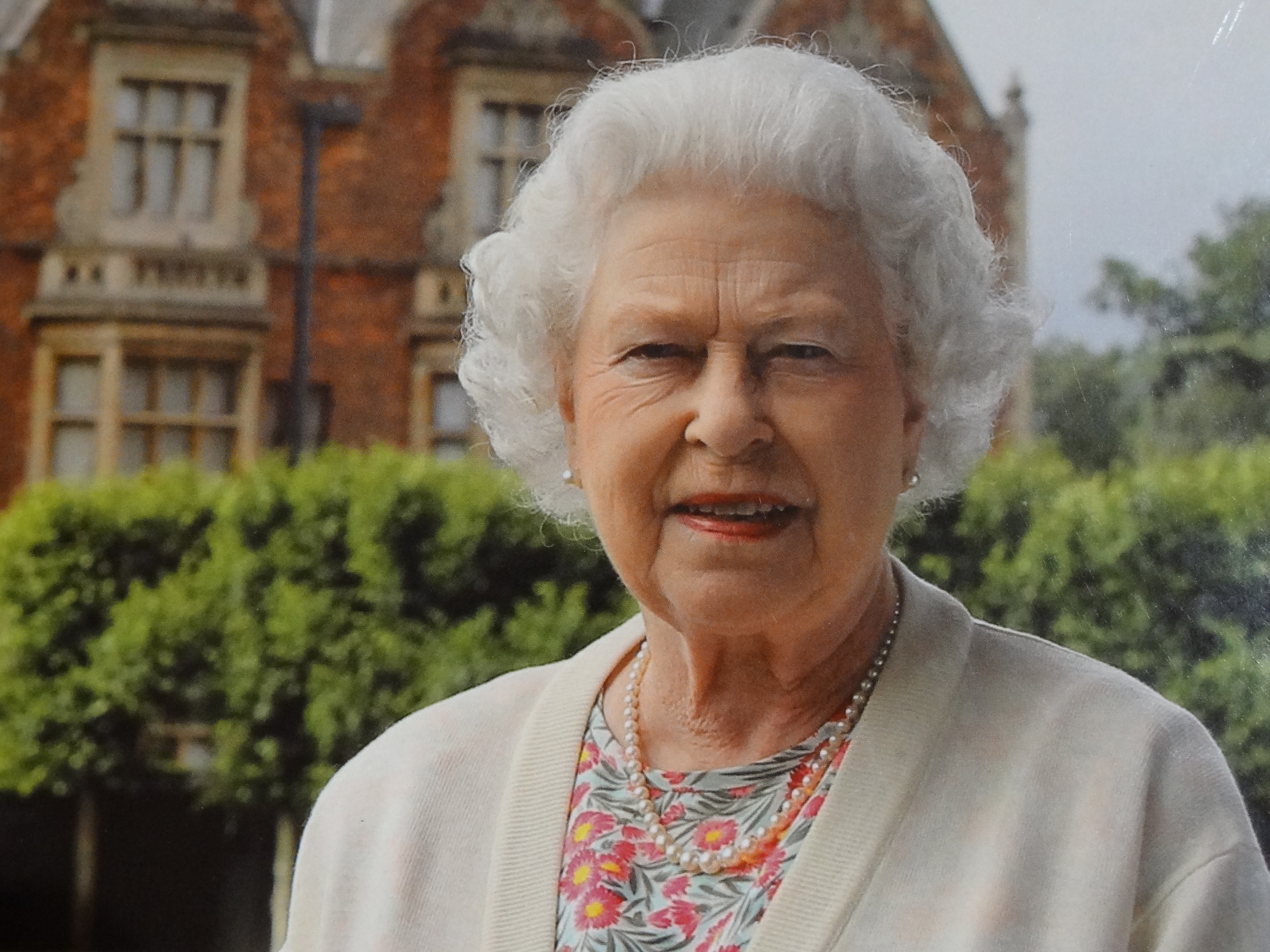
Queen Elizabeth II at Sandringham in 2014

In January 1957, the Queen received the resignation of Prime Minister Sir Anthony Eden at the house. Eden's wife, Clarissa, recorded the event in her diary, "8 January – Anthony has to go through a Cabinet and listening to Harold prosing for half an hour. Then by train to Sandringham. Many photographers. We arrive into the hall where everyone is looking at the television." At the end of that year, the Queen made her first televised Christmas broadcast from Sandringham. In the 1960s, plans were initiated to demolish the house and replace it with a modern residence by David Roberts, an architect who worked mainly at the University of Cambridge. The plans were not taken forward, but modernisation of the interior of the house and the removal of a range of ancillary buildings were carried out by Hugh Casson, who also decorated the Royal Yacht, Britannia. In 1977, for her silver jubilee, the Queen opened the house to the public.

Sandringham continued to operate as a sporting estate. Pheasants and partridge are no longer reared for this purpose, and Sandringham is now one of the few wild shoots in England. Alongside her equestrian interest in the Sandringham Stud, where she bred several winning horses, the Queen developed a successful gun dog breeding programme at Sandringham. Following the tradition of a kennels at Sandringham established by her great-grandfather, when Queen Alexandra kept more than 100 dogs on the estate, the Queen preferred cocker spaniels and black labrador retrievers, over the yellow type favoured by her father, and the terriers bred by her earlier predecessors.

From his retirement from official duties in August 2017 until his death in April 2021, the Duke of Edinburgh spent much of his time at Wood Farm, a large farmhouse on the Sandringham Estate used by the Duke and the Queen when not hosting guests at the main house. In February 2022 the Queen celebrated the 70th anniversary of her accession at Sandringham. The Queen made her last visit to Sandringham in early July 2022 for five days, after completing her Platinum Jubilee celebrations.

=== Charles III ===
On the death of his mother in September 2022, the Sandringham estate passed to King Charles III. Following in the tradition of Queen Elizabeth II, the King and Queen host members of the royal family at Sandringham over Christmas, including attending church services at St Mary Magdalen together on Christmas Day.

== Architecture and description ==
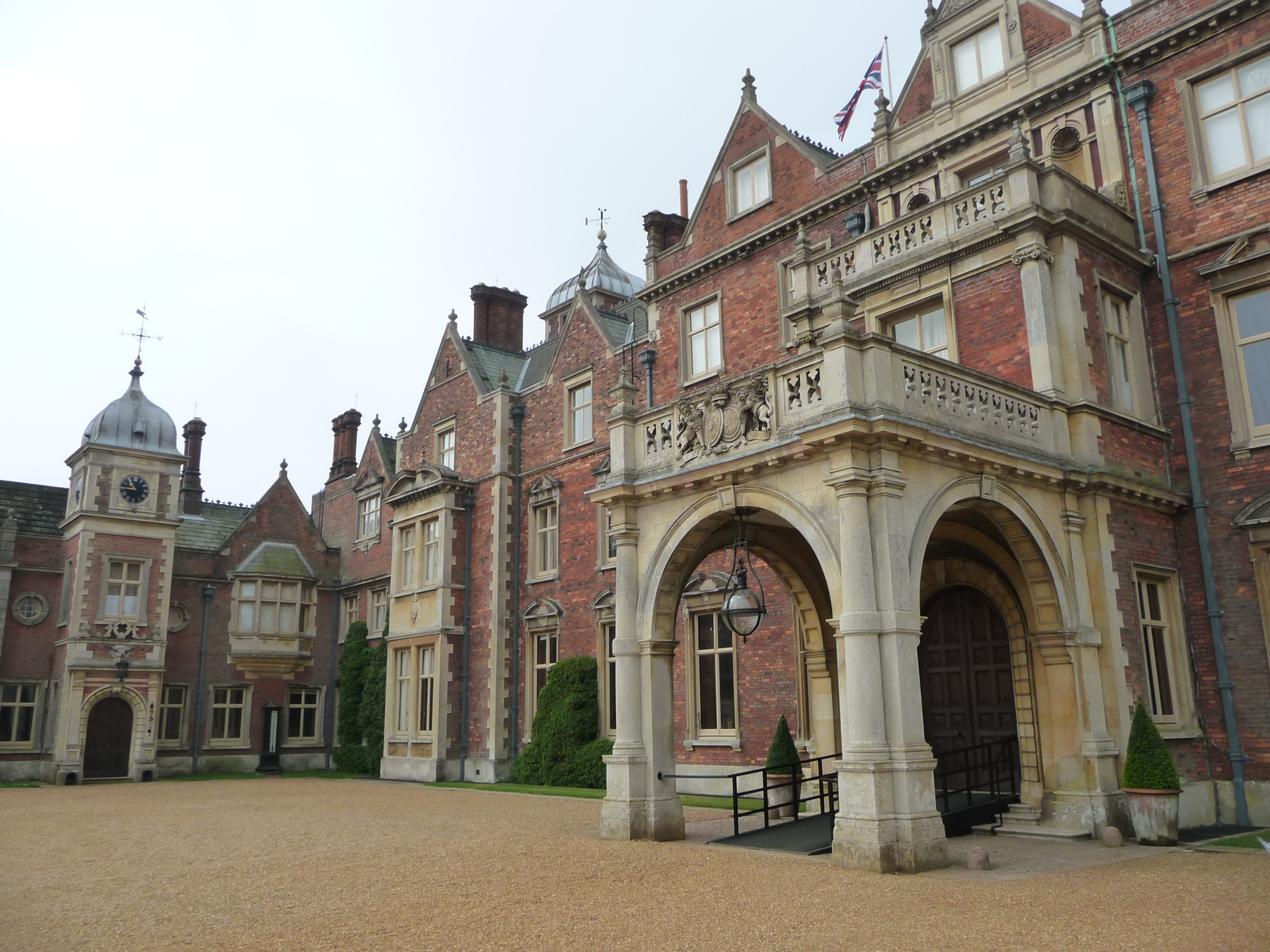
The porte-cochère to the saloon, with the entrance to Edis's ballroom on the left

The house is mainly constructed of red brick with limestone dressings; Norfolk Carrstone is also used extensively, particularly in Edis's additions. The tiled roof contains nine separate clusters of chimney stacks. The style is Jacobethan, with inspiration drawn principally from nearby Blickling Hall. (Note: There are also similarities with Somerleyton Hall, built some 30 years before in neighbouring Suffolk. That house was used as the stand-in for Sandringham House in the 2003 television drama The Lost Prince, about the life of Prince John.) Construction was undertaken by Goggs Brothers of Swaffham. The principal rooms of the house are the saloon, the drawing room, the dining room and the ballroom. Other include the gun room, a library in the former the bowling alley, and the billiard room. The walls of the corridors connecting the principal rooms display a collection of Oriental and Indian arms and armour, gathered by Edward VII on his tour of the East in 1875–1876. Decoration of the house and the provision of furniture and fittings was undertaken by Holland and Sons in the 1870 rebuilding.

=== Saloon ===
The largest room in the house, the saloon is used as the main reception room. The arrangement of entry under the porte-cochère direct into the saloon proved problematic, with no ante-room in which guests could remove their hats and coats. Jenkins describes the decorative style, here and elsewhere in the house, as "Osbert Lancaster's Curzon Street Baroque". The room contains portraits of Queen Victoria and Prince Albert by their favourite artist Franz Xaver Winterhalter. The saloon functioned as a venue for dances, until the construction of the new ballroom by Edis, and has a minstrels' gallery to accommodate musicians. The room contains a weighing machine; Edward VII was in the habit of requiring his guests to be weighed on their arrival, and again on their departure, to establish that his lavish hospitality had caused them to put on weight.

=== Drawing room ===
The drawing room is described by Jenkins as "the nearest Sandringham gets to pomp". On one of her two visits to the house, Victoria recorded in her journal that, after dinner, the party adjourned to "the very long and handsome drawing room with painted ceiling and two fireplaces". The room contains portraits of Queen Alexandra and her daughters, Princess Louise, Princess Victoria, and Princess Maud of Wales, by Edward Hughes. White marble statues complete what has been described as a "tour de force of fashionable late-Victorian decoration".

=== Ballroom ===
The ballroom was added by Edis in 1884, to overcome the inconvenience of having only the saloon as the major room for entertaining. As this was also the main family living room, it had previously been necessary to remove the furniture when the saloon was required for dances and large entertainments. Alexandra recorded her delight at the result, "Our new ballroom is beautiful I think & a great success & avoids pulling the hall to pieces each time there is a ball or anything". At the time of Queen Victoria's visit in 1889, the room was used for a theatrical performance given by Sir Henry Irving and Ellen Terry. Queen Elizabeth II used the room for entertainments and as a cinema.

=== Dining room ===
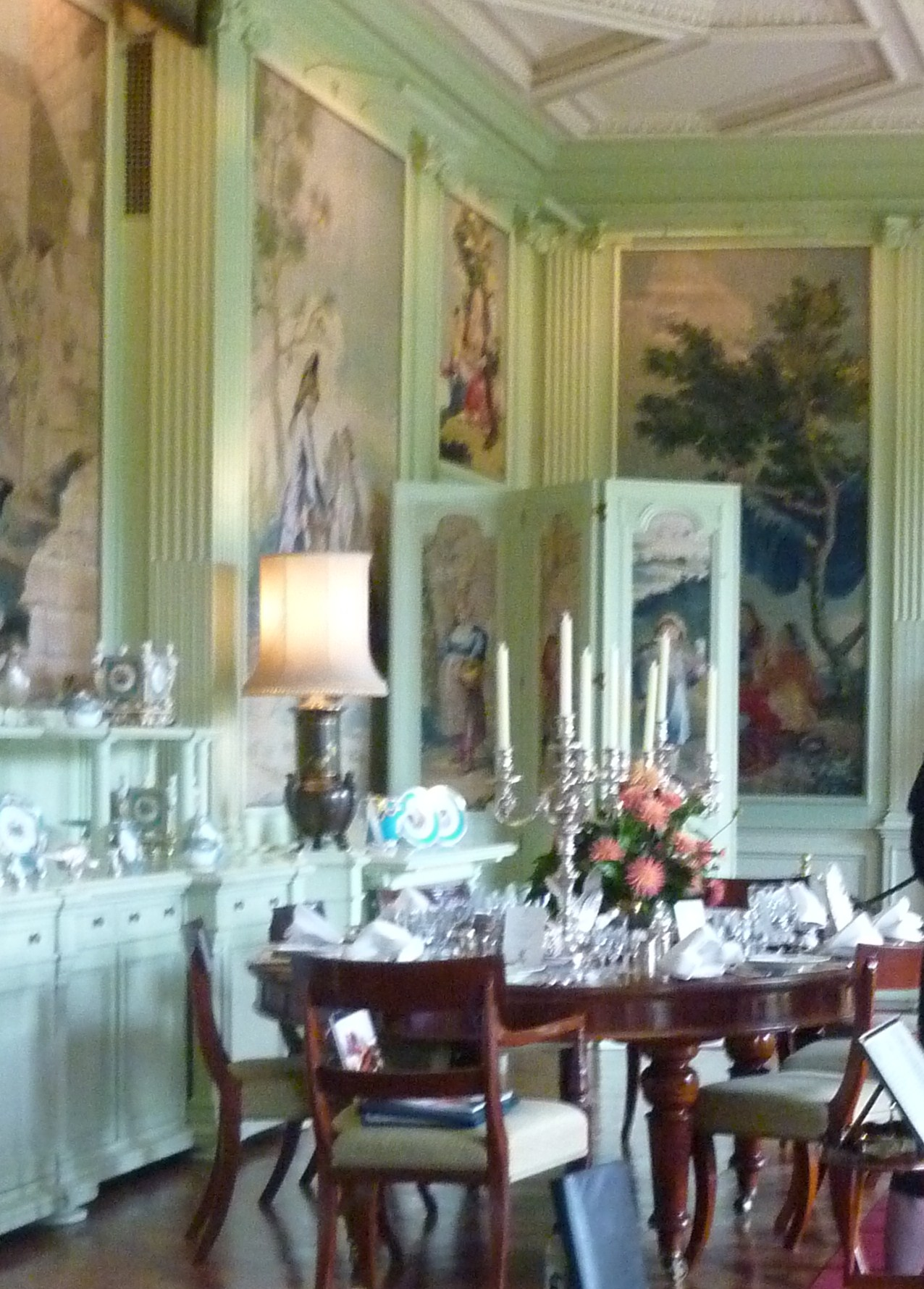
The dining room

The walls of the dining room are decorated with Spanish tapestries including some by Goya which were a gift from Alfonso XII of Spain. The walls are panelled in oak, painted light green for Queen Mary who had been inspired by a visit to a Scottish castle. (Note: A 2008 article in the magazine Country Life suggests that the decoration was undertaken for Queen Elizabeth in 1938, following a visit to Braemar Castle.) Jill Franklin's study of the planning of Victorian country houses includes a photograph of the dining room at Sandringham with the table laid for dinner for twenty-four, a "very usual" number to seat for dinner in a major country house of the time.

=== Appreciation ===
Sandringham House has not been admired by critics. Its chief fault is the lack of harmony between Humbert's original building and Edis's extensions, "a contrast between the northern and southern halves of the house (that) has been much criticised ever since". The architectural historian John Martin Robinson wrote in 1982, "Sandringham, the latest in date of the houses of the British monarchy, is the least distinguished architecturally". In his biography of Queen Mary, James Pope-Hennessy compared the house unfavourably to "a golf-hotel at St Andrews or a station-hotel at Strathpeffer". Simon Jenkins considered Sandringham "unattractive", with a "grim, institutional appearance". Nikolaus Pevsner described the architectural style as "frenetic"; Girouard expressed himself perplexed as to the preference shown by the royal family for A. J. Humbert, a patronage the writer Adrian Tinniswood described as "the Victorian Royal Family's knack for choosing second-rate architects". An article on the house in the June 1902 edition of Country Life opined, "of mere splendour there is not much, but of substantial comfort a good deal". The writer Clive Aslet suggests that the sporting opportunities offered by the estate were the main attraction for its royal owners, rather than "the house itself, which even after rebuilding was never beguiling". (Note: Queen Elizabeth II had a more ambivalent attitude to the house's merits than either her father or her grandfather. James Pope-Hennessy recorded a conversation with the Queen's aunt, Princess Alice, Duchess of Gloucester, in May 1957. "[We] discussed Sandringham and how ugly it is. Princess Alice said that she had 'once asked Lilibet shall I burn the house down for you? I'm quite ready to. Would you mind?' To which the Queen had answered 'I am not sure whether I should mind'.")

The fittings and furnishings were also criticised; the biographer of George V, Kenneth Rose, wrote that, "except for some tapestries given by Alfonso XII, (Note: These were the Goya tapestries hung in the dining room.) Sandringham had not a single good picture, piece of furniture or other work of art". Neither Edward VII nor his heir were noted for their artistic appreciation; writing of the redevelopments at Buckingham Palace undertaken by George V, and previously by Edward VII, John Martin Robinson wrote that, "the King had no more aesthetic sensibility than his father and expressed impatience with his wife's keen interest in furniture and decoration". In the series of articles on the house and estate published in 1902 by Country Life to celebrate Edward VII's accession, the author noted the royal family's "set policy of preferring those pictures that have associations to those which have merely artistic merit". Exceptions came to include works from the collection of mainly 20th-century English art assembled by the Queen Mother, including pieces by Edward Seago and John Piper, who produced a view of Sandringham. John Piper's sombre palette did not always find favour with Queen Elizabeth or her husband, George VI remarking, "You seem to have very bad luck with your weather, Mr Piper". The house also has an extensive holding of works by Fabergé, the world's largest, assembled by Queen Alexandra and later members of the family, which includes representations of farm animals from the Sandringham estate commissioned by Edward VII as presents for his wife.

Although not highly regarded as architecture, Sandringham is a rare extant example of a full-scale Victorian country house, described in the magazine Country Life as "lived in and beautifully maintained, complete with its original contents, gardens and dependent estate buildings". The house, the landscaped gardens, park and woodlands are listed Grade II* on the Register of Historic Parks and Gardens, Grade II* being the second-highest listing, reserved for "particularly important buildings of more than special interest".

== Gardens ==
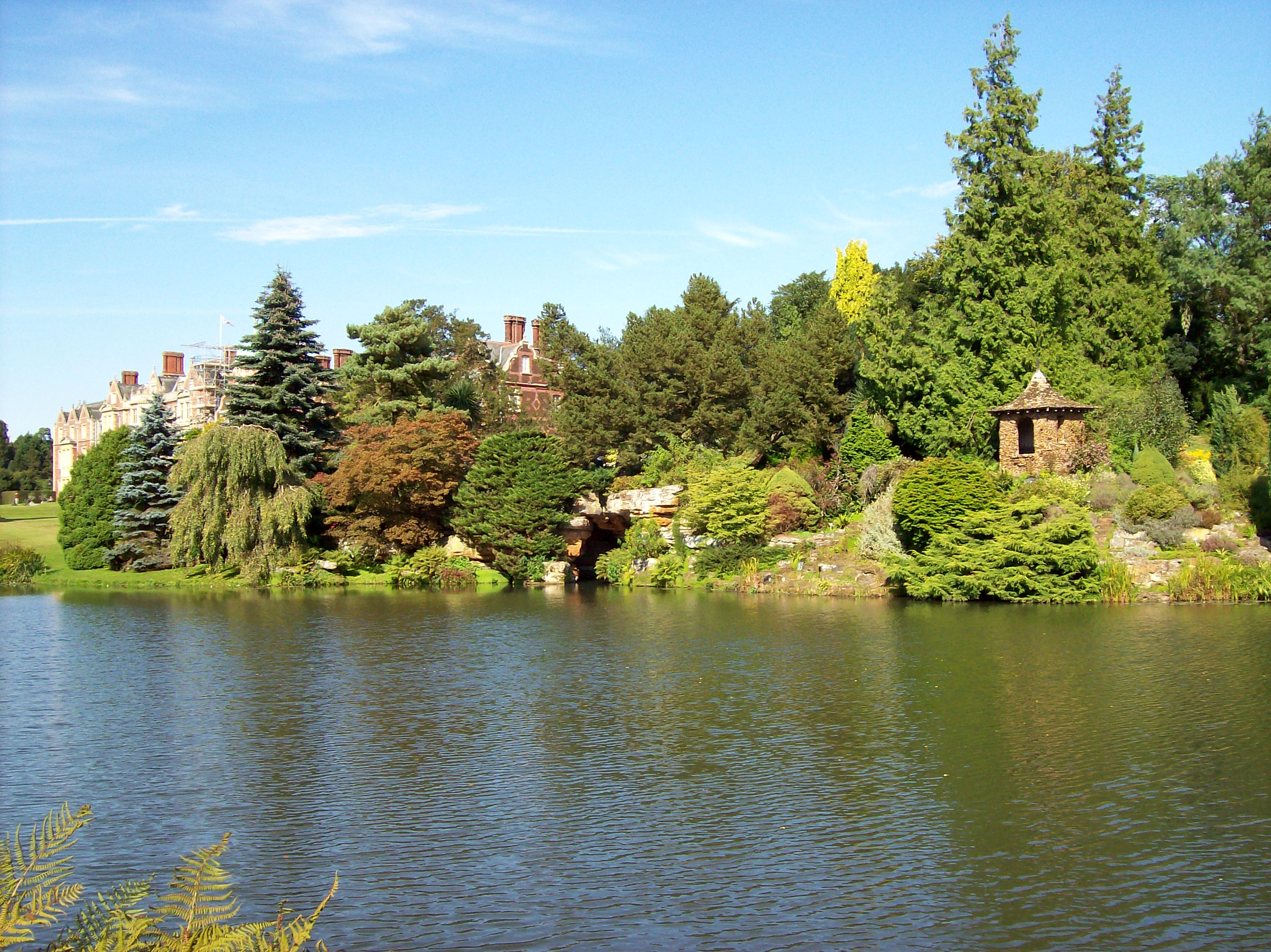
The Upper Lake and The Nest

The gardens and country park comprise 600 acres (240 ha) of the estate with the gardens extending to 49 acres (20 ha). They were predominantly laid out from the 1860s, with later alterations and simplifications. Edward VII sought advice from William Broderick Thomas and Ferdinand de Rothschild, a friend and adviser to the King throughout his life. The original lake was filled and replaced with the elaborate parterres fashionable at the time. These have since been removed. Two new lakes were dug further from the house, and bordered by rockeries constructed of Pulhamite stone. A summerhouse, called The Nest, stands above the Upper Lake, a gift in 1913 to Queen Alexandra from the comptroller of her household, General Sir Dighton Probyn. (Note: Sir Dighton was devoted to Queen Alexandra and the summerhouse bears an inscribed plaque: "The Queen's Nest – A small offering to The Blessed Lady from Her Beloved Majesty's very devoted old servant General Probyn 1913 – Today, tomorrow and every day, God bless her and guard her I fervently pray".)

The gardens to the north of the house, which are overlooked by the suite of rooms used by George VI, were remodelled and simplified by Geoffrey Jellicoe for the King and his wife after the Second World War. A statue of Father Time, dating from the 18th century, was purchased by the Queen Mother and installed in 1951. (Note: Sir Robin Mackworth-Young's 1993 guide suggests the statue was purchased by Queen Mary. George Plumptre follows Mackworth-Young, but both Walch and Titchmarsh disagree.) Further areas of the gardens were remodelled by Sir Eric Savill in the 1960s for Queen Elizabeth and Prince Philip. The extensive kitchen gardens, which in Edward VII's time included carriage drives to allow guests to view the "highly ornamental" arrangements, (Note: The Prince of Wales liked to claim that the development of the kitchen gardens was entirely funded from his racing winnings. When showing guests around, the Prince would murmur, "Persimmon, all Persimmon".) were also laid to lawn during Queen Elizabeth II's reign, having proved uneconomic to maintain. In 2023, King Charles III developed an environmentally-friendly topiary garden with more than 5,000 yew trees, bedding and paths.

== Wider estate ==
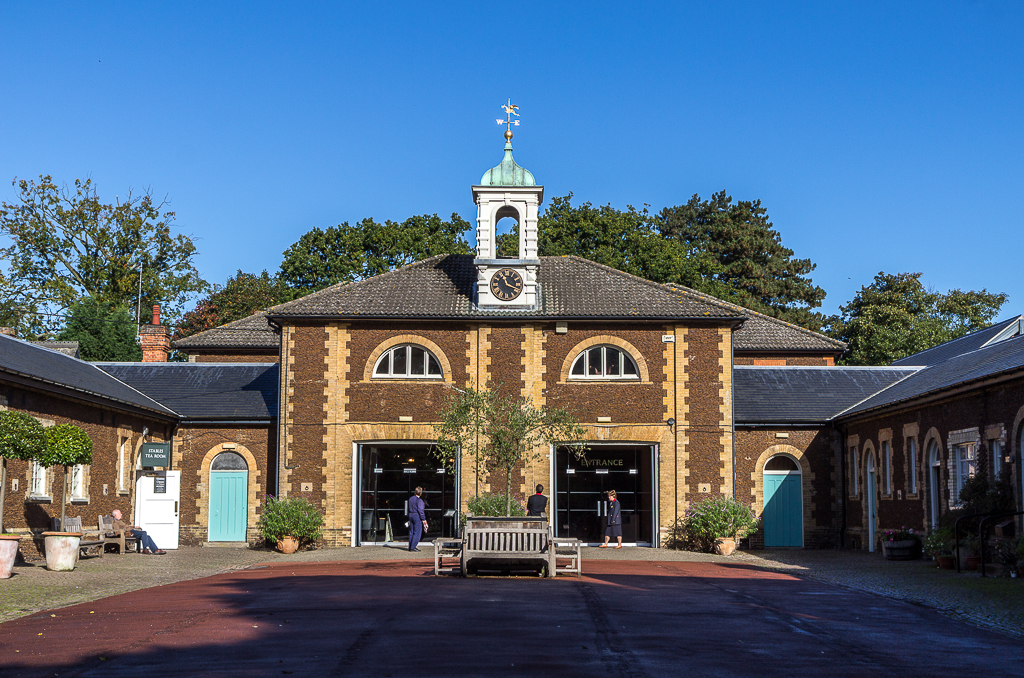
The Museum housed in the former coach house and stables

The 20,000-acre (8,100 ha) Sandringham estate has some of the finest shoots in England, and is used for royal shooting parties. Covering seven villages, the estate's other main activities, aside from tourism, are arable crops and forestry. The grounds provided room for Queen Alexandra's menagerie of horses, dogs, cats, and other animals. In 1886 a racing pigeon loft was constructed for birds given to the Duke of York by King Leopold II of Belgium and one or more lofts for pigeons have been maintained ever since. The Norwich Gates, designed by Thomas Jeckyll and made by the local firm of Barnard, Bishop and Barnard, were a wedding present for Edward and Alexandra from "the gentry of Norfolk".

In 2007 Sandringham House and its grounds were designated a protected site under Section 128 of the Serious Organised Crime and Police Act 2005. This makes it a criminal offence to trespass in the house or its grounds. The Sandringham estate has a museum in the former coach house with displays of royal life and estate history. The museum also houses an extensive collection of royal motor vehicles including a 1900 Daimler owned by Edward VII and a 1939 Merryweather & Sons fire engine, made for the Sandringham fire brigade which was founded in 1865 and operated independently on the estate until 1968. The coach house stables and garaging were designed by A. J. Humbert at the same time as his construction of the main house. The estate contains several houses with close links to the royal family.

=== Anmer Hall ===
Anmer Hall is a Georgian house on the grounds, purchased by the Prince of Wales in 1896. Formerly occupied by the Duke of Kent, it was the main country home of the Prince and Princess of Wales, until their move to Adelaide Cottage at Windsor.

=== Appleton House ===
When Prince Carl of Denmark (later King Haakon VII of Norway) and Princess Maud were married on 22 July 1896, Appleton House was a wedding gift to them from the bride's parents, the Prince and Princess of Wales. Queen Maud became fond of Appleton, "our little house is a perfect paradise", and their son, Prince Alexander (the future King Olav V of Norway), was born at the house in 1903. After Queen Maud died in 1938, King Haakon returned the property. The last inhabitants were King George VI and Queen Elizabeth who stayed there during a visit to Norfolk during World War II, when Sandringham was closed. Lascelles considered it "an ugly villa, but not uncomfortable". The house was demolished in 1984.

=== Park House ===
Constructed by Edward VII, in 1863, Park House has been owned by the royal family for many years. The birthplace of Diana, Princess of Wales, when the house was let to her father, it was subsequently run as a hotel managed by the Leonard Cheshire charity. In 2019, the charity developed plans for a £2.3m refurbishment programme, which were deferred because of the 2020 COVID-19 pandemic. The charity has since decided to discontinue the redevelopment and exit the lease.

=== Wood Farm ===
Wood Farm has been part of the Sandringham Estate since the time of Edward VII. In the early 20th century, it was home to Prince John, the youngest of the six children of King George V and Queen Mary. Born in 1905, the Prince was epileptic, and spent much of his short life in relative seclusion at Sandringham. He died at Wood Farm, his home for the last two years of his life, on 18 January 1919. Prince Philip, Duke of Edinburgh, lived at Wood Farm after retiring from royal duties.

=== York Cottage ===
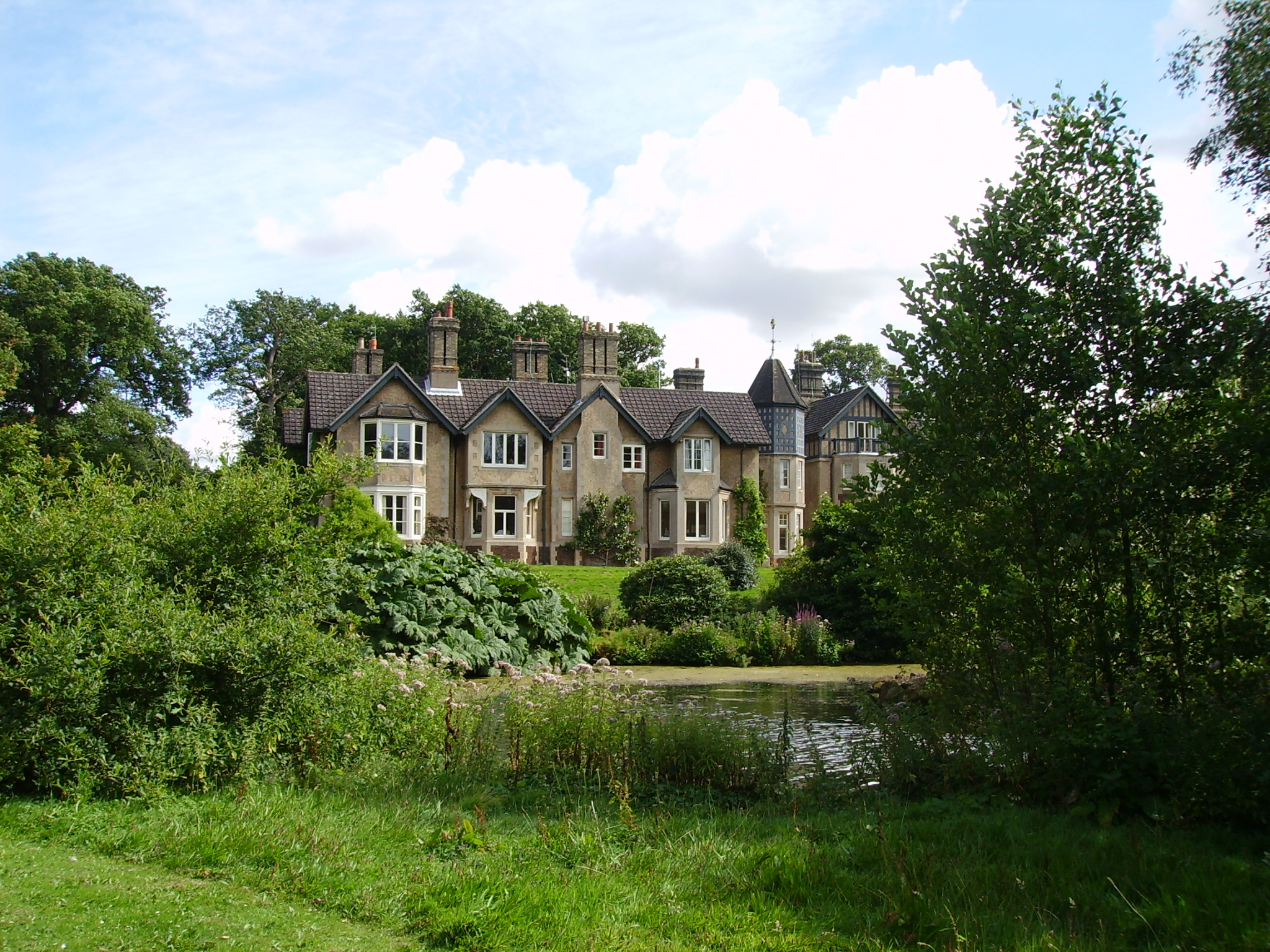
York Cottage

York Cottage, originally known as Bachelors' Cottage, was built by Edward, Prince of Wales, soon after he acquired Sandringham, in order to provide further accommodation for guests. It was home to George V from 1893 until his mother's death enabled him to move into the main house in 1925. Edward VIII, by then Duke of Windsor, told his father's biographer Harold Nicolson, "Until you have seen York Cottage you will never understand my father". The cottage was no more highly regarded architecturally than the main house; James Pope-Hennessy, the official biographer of Queen Mary, called it, "tremendously vulgar and emphatically, almost defiantly hideous". (Note: Pope-Hennessy was often no more impressed by the courtiers and staff he encountered during his research visits to Sandringham. Of Lady Willans, widow of one of the royal doctors, he wrote: "She told me several totally pointless anecdotes ...[she] is one of those numerous and obeisant throng of royal snobs which flourish like fungi in the shadow of royalty.") Nicolson described it as a "glum little villa (with) rooms indistinguishable from those of any Surbiton or Upper Norwood home". He was particularly dismissive of the royal bathing arrangements: "Oh my God! what a place. The King's and Queen's baths had lids that shut down so that when not in use they could be used as tables. It is almost incredible that the heir to so vast a heritage lived in this horrible little house." Nicolson's strictures did not appear in his official biography of the King. York Cottage as of 2000 is the estate office for the Sandringham Estate.

== Public access ==
The country park and the visitors' centre are normally open throughout the year. The house, gardens and museum were usually opened annually from the end of March until the end of October, but COVID-19 led to the closure of much of the estate. Staged re-opening took place from February 2022. Following the death of Elizabeth II, Sandringham was closed for a period of official mourning. The country park subsequently reopened, but the house and garden remained closed to the public until April 2023.

== See also ==
- St Mary Magdalene Church, Sandringham

== Bibliography ==
- Aslet, C. (2005). Landmarks of Britain. London, UK: Hodder & Stoughton. ISBN 978-0-340-73510-7.
- Battiscombe, Georgiana (1969). Queen Alexandra. London, UK: Constable. ISBN 978-0-094-56560-9.
- Cahill, Kevin (2001). Who Owns Britain. Edinburgh, UK: Canongate. ISBN 978-1-841-95310-6.
- Cornforth, J. (1988). The Search for a Style: Country Life and Architecture 1897–1935. London, UK: André Deutsch. OCLC 987862203.
- Dixon, Roger; Muthesius, Stefan (1993). Victorian Architecture. London, UK: Thames & Hudson. ISBN 978-0-195-20048-5.
- Dunn, Charlotte (30 August 2017). "Royal Residences: Sandringham House". The Royal Household.
- Eden, C. (2007). Haste, Cate (ed.). Clarissa Eden, A Memoir: From Churchill to Eden. London, UK: Weidenfeld & Nicolson. ISBN 978-0-297-85193-6. OCLC 496921033.
- Feuchtwanger, Edward (2006). Albert and Victoria: The Rise and Fall of the House of Saxe-Coburg-Gotha. London, UK: Hambledon Continuum. ISBN 978-1-847-25015-5.
- Franklin, Jill (1981). The Gentleman's Country House and its Plan: 1835–1914. London, UK: Routledge. ISBN 978-0-710-00622-6.
- Girouard, M. (1979). The Victorian Country House. New Haven, CT / London, UK: Yale University Press. ISBN 978-0-300-02390-9.
- Girouard, M. (1979). Historic Houses of Britain. London, UK: Artus Publishing. OCLC 36306478.
- Gliddon, Gerald (October 2002). The Aristocracy and the Great War. Cecil, Hugh (foreword). Norwich, Norfolk, UK: Gliddon Books. ISBN 978-094789335-4.
- Hall, Michael (1994). The English Country House: From the Archives of Country Life 1897–1939. London, UK: Reed International Books. ISBN 978-1-857-32530-0. OCLC 832426788.
- Hattersley, R. (2006). The Edwardians. London, UK: Abacus. ISBN 978-0-349-11662-4. OCLC 494146281.
- Jenkins, S. (2003). England's Thousand Best Houses. London, UK: Penguin Books. ISBN 978-0-713-99596-1.
- Jones, Nigel (2005). Architecture of England, Scotland, and Wales. Connecticut, US: Greenwood Publishing Group. ISBN 978-0-313-31850-4.
- Judd, Denis (2012). George VI. London, UK: I.B. Tauris. ISBN 978-1-780-76071-1. OCLC 820617845.
- King, Greg (2007). Twilight of Splendor: The Court of Queen Victoria During Her Diamond Jubilee Year. New York, NY: John Wiley & Sons. ISBN 978-0-470-04439-1.
- Lascelles, A. (2006). Hart-Davis, D. (ed.). King's Counsellor: Abdication and War – The Diaries of Sir Alan Lascelles. London, UK: Weidenfeld & Nicolson. OCLC 607860040.
- Lees-Milne, J. (1981). Harold Nicolson: A Biography 1930–1968. Vol. 2. London, UK: Chatto & Windus. ISBN 978-0-701-12602-5. OCLC 59990886.
- Mackworth-Young, Robin; Ransom, Roger (1993). Sandringham. Norwich, UK: Jarrold Publishing. OCLC 51796971.
- Matson, John (2011). Sandringham Days: The Domestic Life of the Royal Family in Norfolk 1862–1952. Stroud, UK: The History Press. ISBN 978-0-752-46582-1. OCLC 751833059.
- Messent, Claude J.W. (1974). The Architecture on the Royal Estate of Sandringham. Norwich, UK: Self-published. ISBN 978-0-950-13251-8. OCLC 1092122.
- Nicolson, H. (1968). Nicolson, N. (ed.). Diaries and Letters: 1945–62. Vol. 3. London, UK: Collins. OCLC 874688390.
- Palmer, Alan (1997). The Kaiser: Warlord of the Second Reich. London, UK: Phoenix Books. ISBN 978-1-857-99867-2. OCLC 722693714.
- Pevsner, N.; Wilson, Bill (2002). Norfolk 2: North-West and South. The Buildings of England. New Haven, CT / London, UK: Yale University Press. ISBN 978-0-300-09657-6.
- Physick, John; Darby, Michael (1973). Marble Halls – Drawings and Models of Victorian Secular Buildings. Margate, Kent, UK: Eyre and Spottiswoode Ltd. ISBN 978-0-901-48668-4.
- Plumptre, George (1981). Royal Gardens. London, UK: William Collins, Sons. ISBN 978-0-002-11871-2. OCLC 833434627.
- Plumptre, George (1995). Edward VII. Ann Arbor, MI: University of Michigan Press. ISBN 978-1-857-93076-4.
- Pope-Hennessy, J. (2019). Vickers, Hugo (ed.). The Quest for Queen Mary. London, UK: Hodder & Stoughton. ISBN 978-1-529-33061-8. OCLC 1049908807.
- Rhodes James, R.R. (1998). A Spirit Undaunted: The Political Role of George VI. London, UK: Abacus. ISBN 978-0-349-11118-6. OCLC 59457645.
- Robinson, J.M. (1982). Royal Residences. London, UK: MacDonald & Co. OCLC 469780876.
- Rose, K. (2000). King George V. London, UK: Phoenix Books. ISBN 978-1-842-12001-9.
- Tinniswood, Adrian (2016). The Long Weekend: Life in the English Country House between the Wars. London, UK: Jonathan Cape. ISBN 978-022-409945-5. OCLC 951212805.
- Titchmarsh, Alan (2014). The Queen's Houses: Royal Britain at Home. London, UK: BBC Books. ISBN 978-1-849-90217-5. OCLC 980283702.
- Walch, Helen (2012). Sandringham: A Royal Estate for 150 Years. Sandringham, UK: The Sandringham Estate. Archived from the original on 28 June 2018.
- Wilson, A.N. (2016). Victoria: A Life. London, UK: Atlantic Books. ISBN 978-1-786-49034-6. OCLC 944156927.
- Windsor, Edward, Duke of (1951). A King's Story: The Memoirs of H.R.H the Duke of Windsor K.G. London, UK: Cassell & Co. OCLC 804387409.
- Windsor, Edward, Duke of (1998). Godfrey, Rupert (ed.). Letters from a Prince: Edward, Prince of Wales to Mrs Freda Dudley Ward, March 1918 – January 1921. London, UK: Little, Brown and Company. ISBN 978-0-316-64677-2. OCLC 64553370.
- Wyatt, Woodrow (1999). Curtis, Sarah (ed.). The Journals of Woodrow Wyatt. Vol. 2. London, UK: Macmillan Publishers. ISBN 978-0-333-77405-2. OCLC 316647709.
