= Louisa Mary Cresswell =

- Born: Louisa Mary Hogge; 31 May 1830; Biggleswade
- Died: 2 July 1916 (aged 86); Abilene, Texas
- Other names: "The Lady Farmer"
- Occupation: farmer
- Known for: her autobiography
- Spouse: Gerard Oswin Cresswell
- Children: two

Louisa Mary "Louise" Cresswell born Louisa Mary Hogge aka The Lady Farmer (31 May 1830 – 2 July 1916) was a British farmer and autobiographer. She had a farm in England and later lived in Texas. She is known for her autobiography which records an eighteen-year dispute with her English farm's landlord Edward, Prince of Wales.

== Life ==
Louisa Mary Cresswell was born in Biggleswade in 1830, the penultimate child of eleven children of William Hogg(e) and Eliza/ Elisabeth, née Wells. Her father had successful business interests in banking, brewing, and malting, having shops and premises in Biggleswade and elsewhere. He also inherited his brother's similar businesses. Cresswell was educated at a boarding school in Brighton.

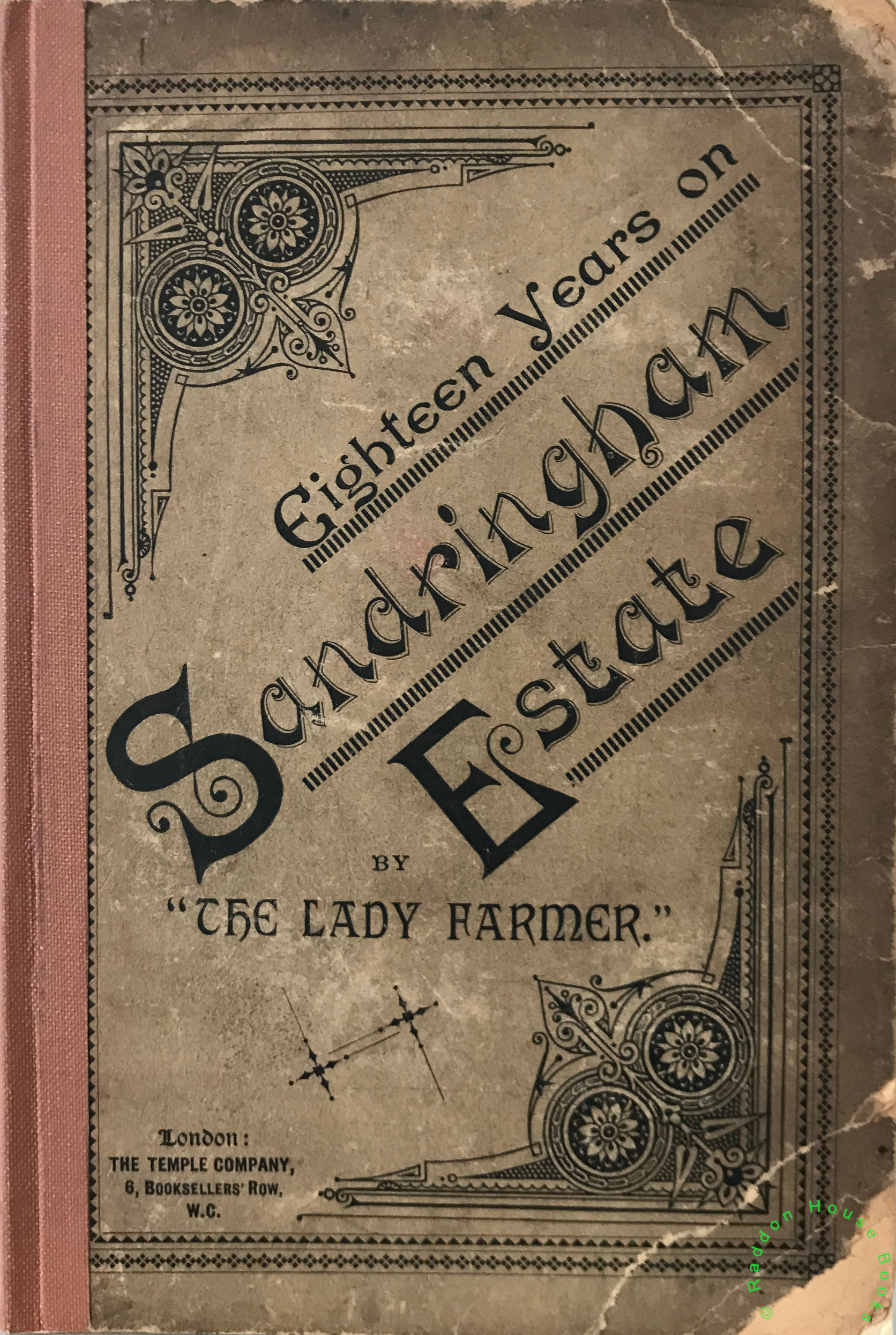
Eighteen Years on Sandringham Estate by The Lady Farmer

In Norfolk she became acquainted with Gerard Oswin Cresswell, who came from a banking family but like her shared an interest in the outdoors. In 1859 he had become a tenant farmer at Sedgeford. She married him in April 1862 and the two of them went to live at an even larger 900 acre farm, Appleton, at Sandringham where they divided the business between them. The new owner of the land was the Prince of Wales and Appleton House had four receptions and twenty rooms in total.

In 1863 their baby daughter, Frances, died. They had one surviving child, Gerard Francis Oswald, who was born in 1864. In 1865, when she was 35. her husband died and she was left in sole charge of a large farm. 90% of large farms at that time were run by men and she did not have a working-age son who could assist her. However, she did have the advice of a farmer named John Groom who had been her husband's guide to farming issues. She was soon taken to court by James Mingay who she had sacked after a few months. She represented herself in court and Mingay's application for lost wages was dismissed.

She became a subject of discussion as she attended farming events including shows and auctions and she was known as "The Lady Farmer". She had a long running dispute with Edmund/ Edward Beck who was the steward of the land she leased. She particularly objected to the damage done to her land by the Prince's shooting parties. This included the damage that resulted from Edward VII's addiction to shooting, Sandringham's tenant farmers being forbidden from shooting rabbits and hares as this was a privilege reserved for the Prince's guests. The consequent damage caused to the farmers' crops was intended to be compensated by the estate paying "game damages".

In 1880 she left the Sandringham farm after receiving a notice to quit earlier in that year. The farm had suffered a number of years of poor crops and she had rent arrears.

In 1887 she published "Eighteen Years on Sandringham Estate" with the nom-de-plume of "The Lady Farmer". The book is a useful description of the life of a woman running a large estate and her disputes. Later commentators point out that the book was written in retribution and some of the facts like dates are misreported. In 1896 her former home at Sandringham, Appleton, was given to Maud of Wales and the future King Haakon VII as a wedding present by Edward VII.

== Death and legacy ==
Cresswell died in Abilene in Texas and her remains were brought back to be buried in North Runcton. In 2008 a book was written by Mary Mackie about her dispute with Edward VII over Appleton Farm. The book was called "The Prince's Thorn: Edward VII and the Lady Farmer of Sandringham".

== Bibliography ==
- Walch, Helen (2012). Sandringham: A Royal Estate for 150 Years. Sandringham, UK: The Sandringham Estate. Archived from the original on 28 June 2018.
