= Flitcham with Appleton =

Civil parish in Norfolk, England

Coordinates: 52.811°N 0.544°E

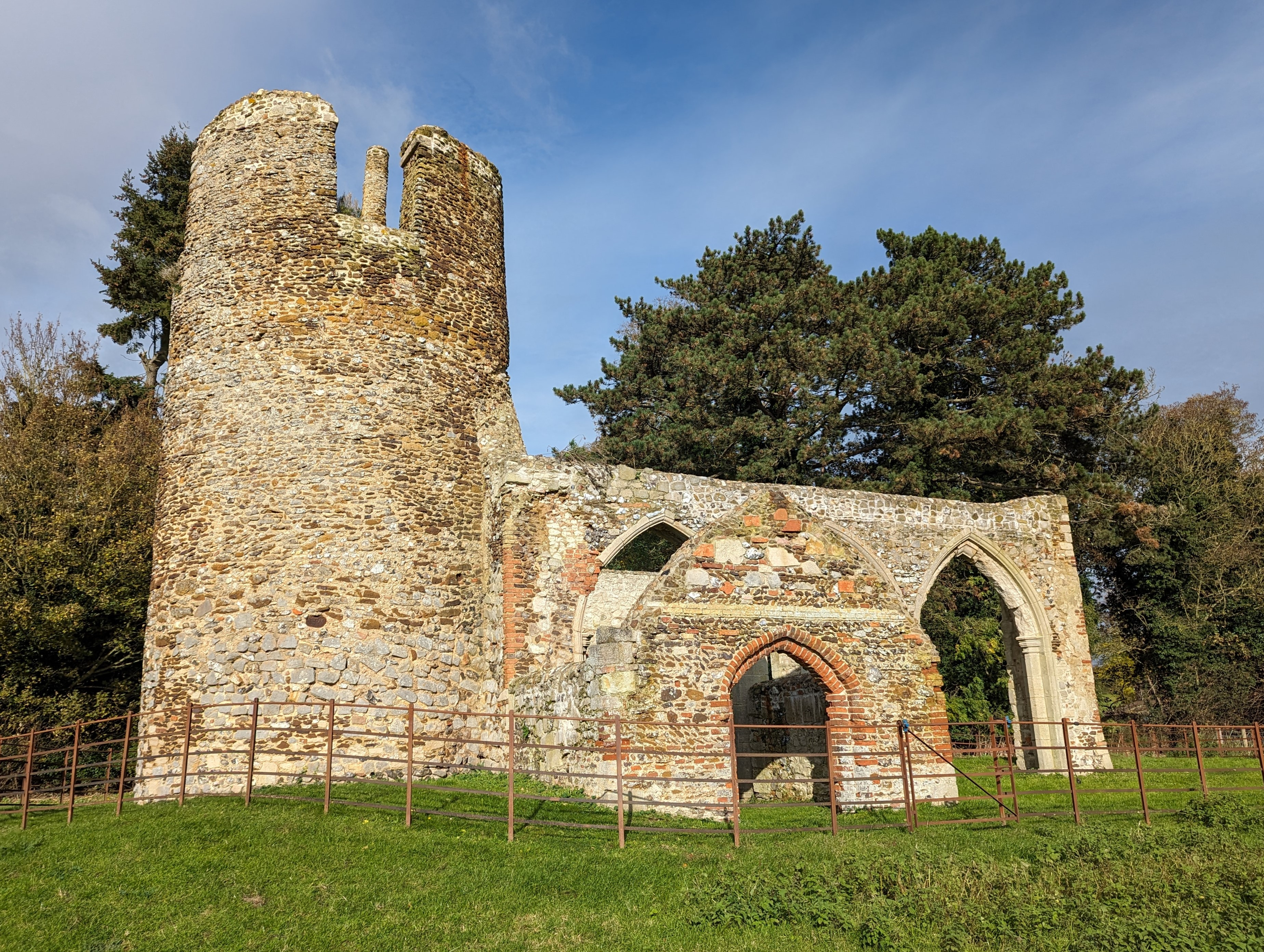
- St Mary's Church, Appleton

- Location within Norfolk
- Area: 17.08 km^{2} (6.59 sq mi)
- Population: 276
  - Density: 16/km^{2} (41/sq mi)
- OS grid reference: TF716267
- Civil parish: Flitcham with Appleton
- District: King's Lynn and West Norfolk
- Shire county: Norfolk
- Region: East
- Country: England
- Sovereign state: United Kingdom
- Post town: KING'S LYNN
- Postcode district: PE31

Flitcham with Appleton is a civil parish in the English county of Norfolk. It covers an area of 17.08 km^{2} (6.59 sq mi) and had a population of 236 in 96 households at the 2001 census. The population, including the parish of Anmer, was 276 at the 2011 Census.

The parish includes the village of Flitcham as well as the sites of the deserted medieval villages of Appleton and Little Appleton. The ruined church of St Mary, the former parish church of Appleton, dates from at least the 11th century. Its ruined round tower remains standing and is a Grade II* listed building.

For the purposes of local government, the parish falls within the district of King's Lynn and West Norfolk.

== See also ==
- Appleton House, Sandringham
- Appleton Water Tower
