= HKMLC Queen Maud Secondary School =

Secondary school in Hong Kong

Coordinates: 22°19′3″N 114°16′1.23″E

- Traditional Chinese: 慕德中學
- Simplified Chinese: 慕德中学
Transcriptions
Standard Mandarin
- Hanyu Pinyin: Mùdé Zhōngxué
Yue: Cantonese
- Jyutping: mou6 dak1 zung1 hok6

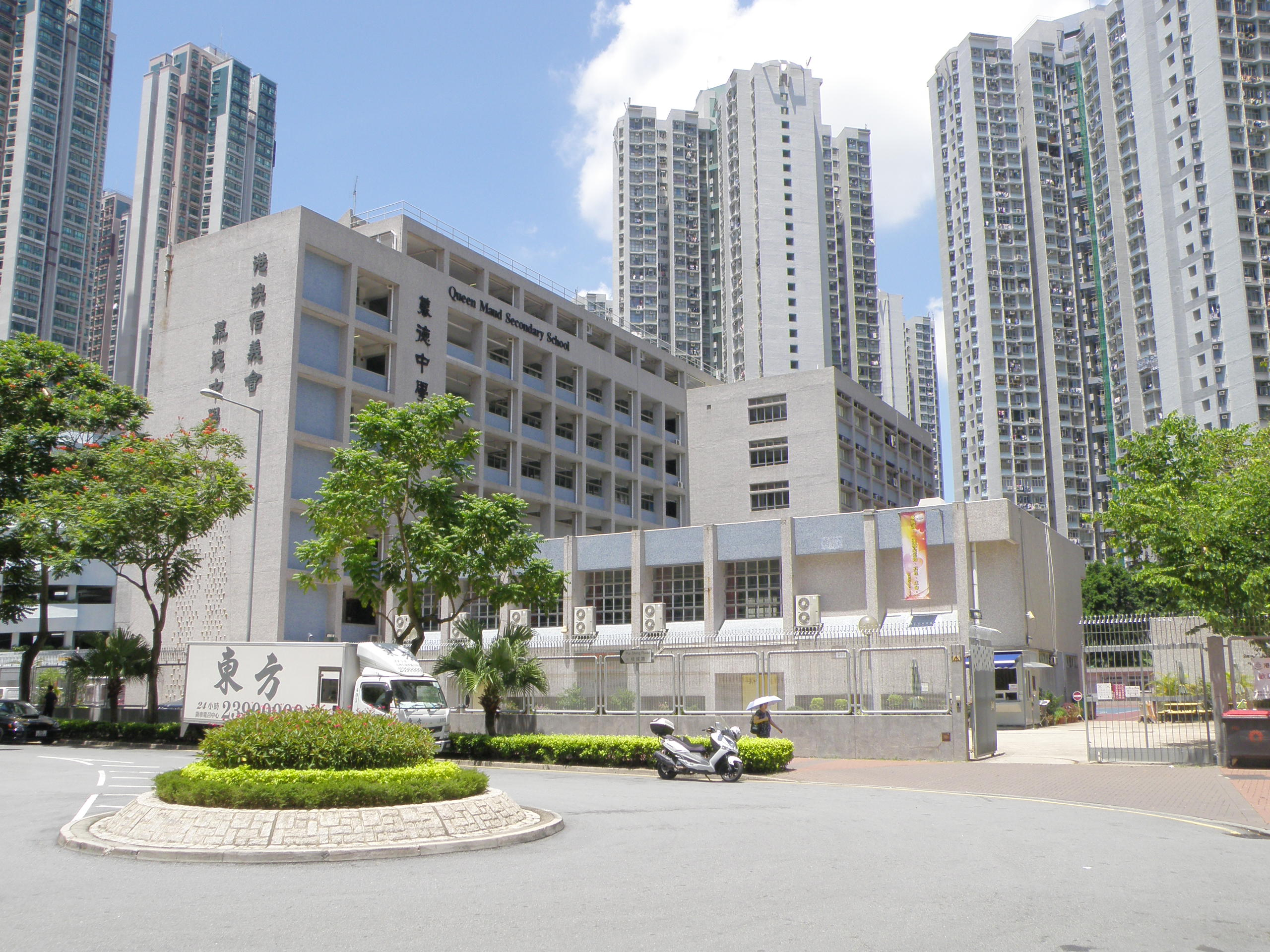
H.K.M.L.C. Queen Maud Secondary School

Hong Kong and Macau Lutheran Church Queen Maud Secondary School (Chinese: 港澳信義會慕德中學) is located in Hau Tak Estate, Tseung Kwan O, New Territories, Hong Kong. It is a memorial school for the Norwegian queen Maud of Wales, sponsored by the HK & Macau Lutheran Church.
