= The Marriage of Princess Maud of Wales =

Painting by Laurits Tuxen

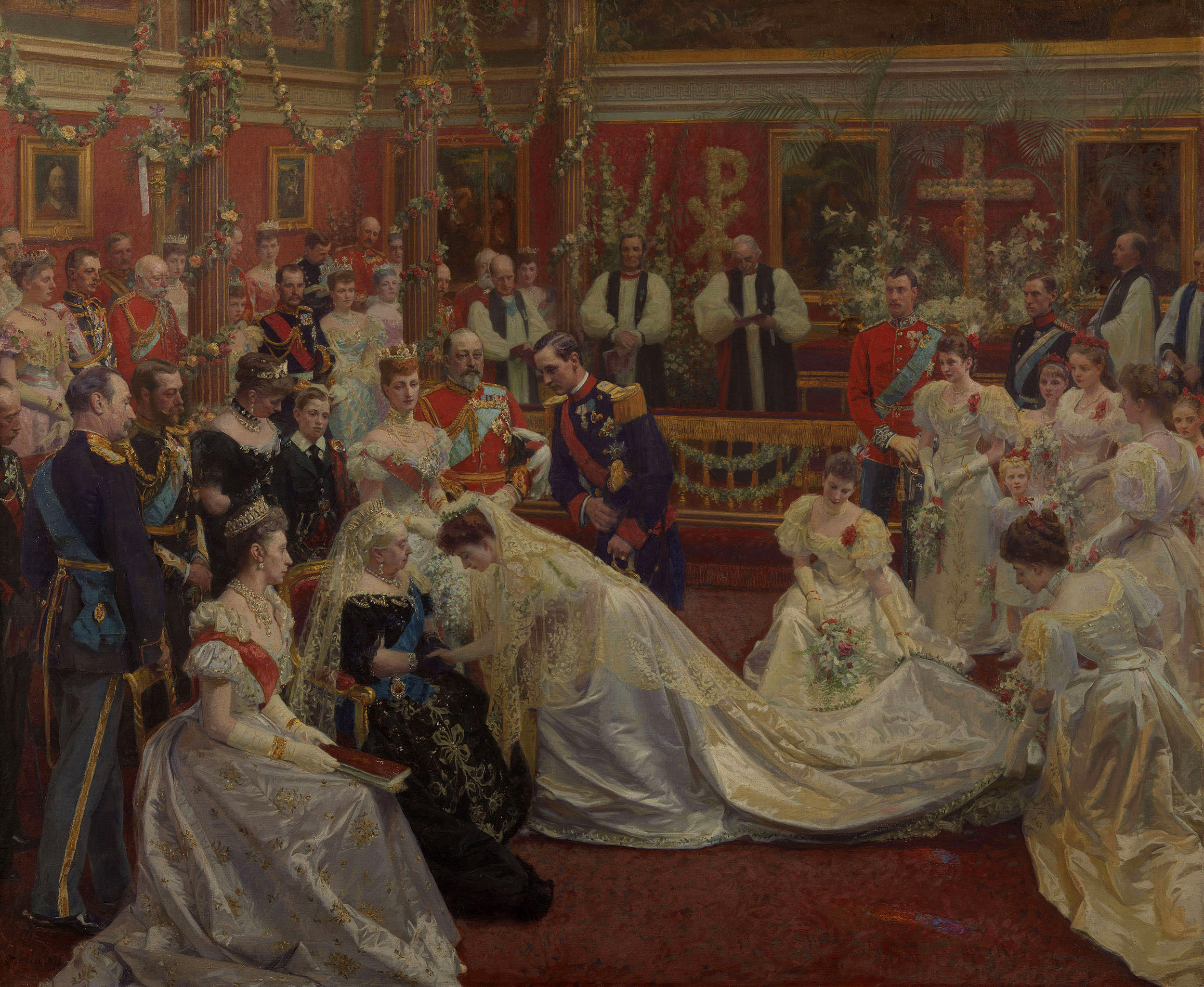
- Artist: Laurits Tuxen
- Year: 1896–97
- Type: Oil on canvas, historical painting
- Dimensions: 141.5 cm × 170.0 cm (55.7 in × 66.9 in)
- Location: Royal Collection

The Marriage of Princess Maud of Wales is an oil on canvas history painting by the Danish artist Laurits Tuxen, from 1896–97.

== History and description ==
It depicts the wedding of Princess Maud of Wales (later Queen of Norway) and Prince Carl of Denmark (later Haakon VII, King of Norway) in the Private Chapel at Buckingham Palace on 22 July 1896.

Maud was the third daughter of Albert Edward, Prince of Wales (later King Edward VII) and Alexandra, Princess of Wales (later Queen Alexandra) and a granddaughter of the then-reigning monarch, Queen Victoria. Carl was the second son of Frederick, Crown Prince of Denmark (later Frederick VIII) and Louise of Sweden. The couple became engaged on 28 October 1895.

The portrait of their wedding was commissioned by Queen Victoria. Tuxen had previously produced a portrait of the wedding of Maud's elder brother, the future George V, in 1894. In this portrait, Queen Victoria is holding Maud's hand who had come to kiss her after the marriage service. To produce the portrait, Tuxen used photographs taken during the ceremony and arranged sittings with some of his subjects. The portrait was finished by 1897 and presented to the Prince and Princess of Wales as a gift from the Queen.
