= Appleton Water Tower =

Water tower near Sandringham, Norfolk, UK

Coordinates: 52.8207°N 0.5290°E

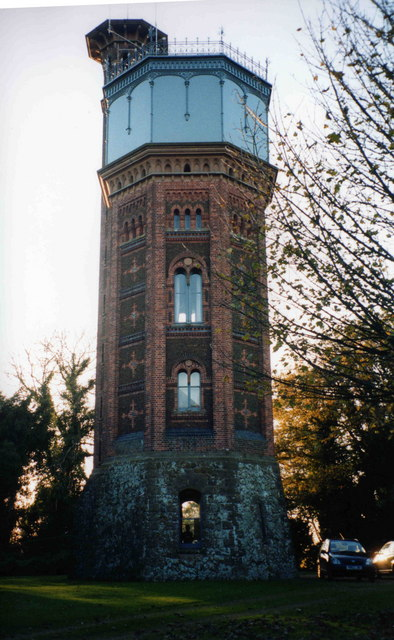
Appleton Water Tower

The Appleton Water Tower is a Victorian water tower located in Flitcham with Appleton, Norfolk. It was constructed in 1877 to improve the quality of the water supply to the nearby Sandringham House and its estate. Accommodation was provided within the tower on the ground and first floors for the water tower custodian, whilst the second floor above the water tank provides a viewing platform. All floors are served by a spiral staircase adjoining the tower.

The tower was leased, done up to a high specification and operated by the Landmark Trust as a holiday let until spring 2026, when it was taken back by the Sandringham Estate.
