= Maud of Wales =

Queen of Norway from 1905 to 1938

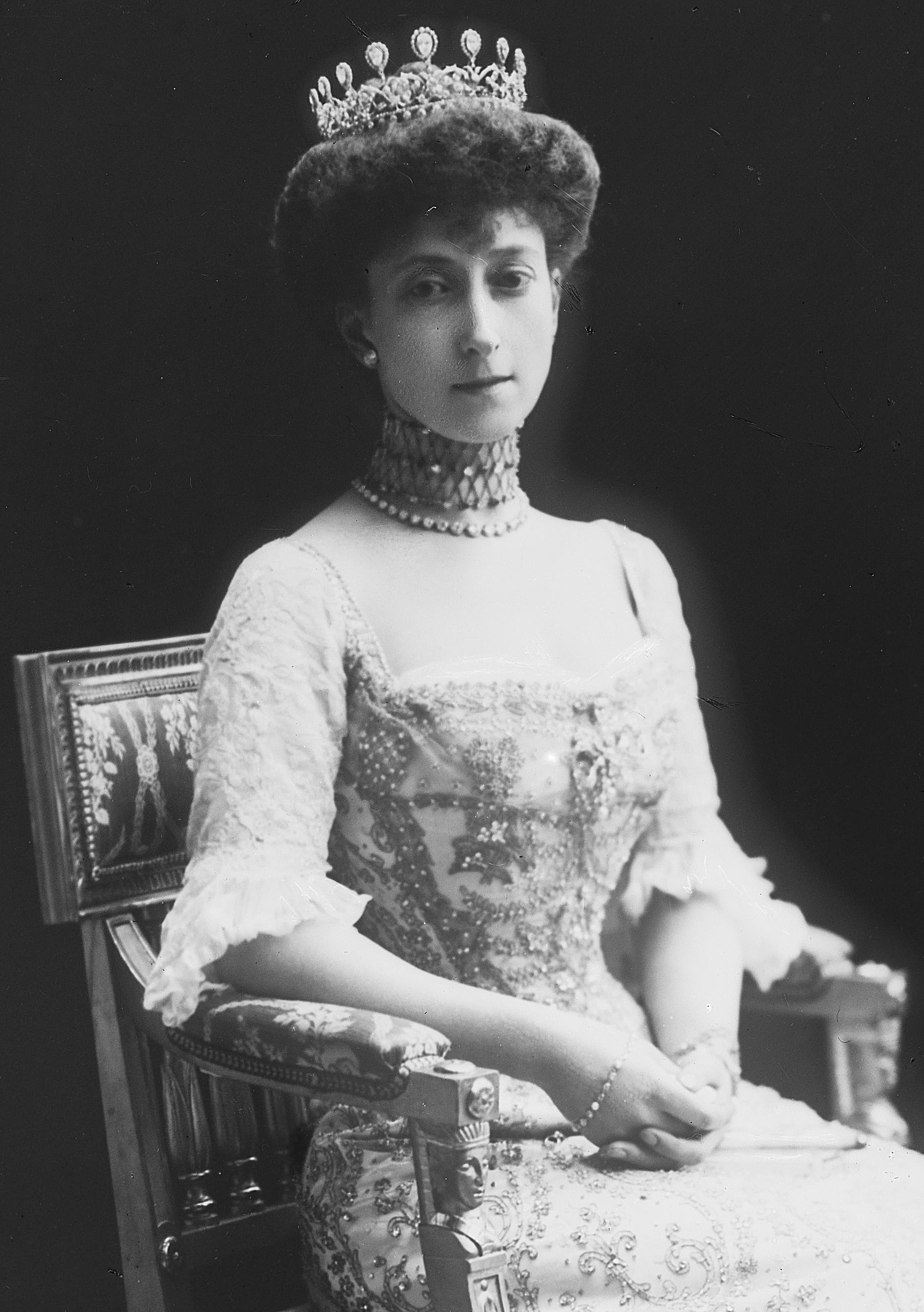
- Maud in 1906

Queen consort of Norway
- Tenure: 18 November 1905 – 20 November 1938
- Coronation: 22 June 1906; Nidaros Cathedral
- Born: 26 November 1869; Marlborough House, London, England
- Died: 20 November 1938 (aged 68); Marylebone, London, England
- Burial: 8 December 1938; Royal Mausoleum, Akershus Castle, Oslo
- Spouse: Haakon VII (m. 1896)
- Issue: Olav V
Names
- Maud Charlotte Mary Victoria
- House: Saxe-Coburg and Gotha
- Father: Edward VII
- Mother: Alexandra of Denmark

Maud of Wales (Maud Charlotte Mary Victoria; 26 November 1869 – 20 November 1938) was Queen of Norway from 18 November 1905 until her death in 1938 as the wife of King Haakon VII.

Maud was born during the reign of her paternal grandmother, Queen Victoria, as the third daughter and youngest surviving child of the Prince and Princess of Wales (later King Edward VII and Queen Alexandra). In 1896, she married her first cousin Prince Carl of Denmark. Following the dissolution of the union between Sweden and Norway in November 1905, Carl was elected King of Norway, taking the name Haakon VII. Maud thus became queen consort of Norway. She and her husband quickly adapted to their new roles and Norwegian identity, including her appreciation for the country's winter sports. Maud maintained strong connections to her native England, visiting every year and serving as a link between the British and Norwegian monarchies. Maud died in London on 20 November 1938.

== Early life and education ==
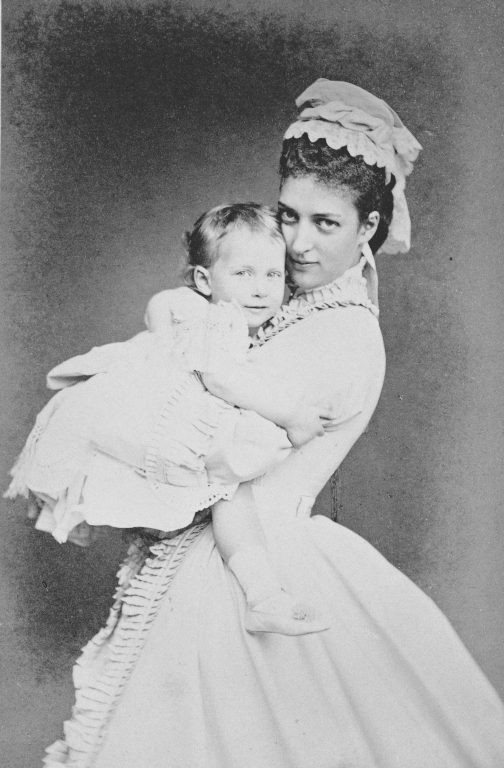
Maud with her mother in 1872

Maud was born at 12:20 am on 26 November 1869 at Marlborough House, London. She was the third daughter and fifth child of Albert Edward, Prince of Wales, and Alexandra, Princess of Wales. Albert Edward was the eldest son of Queen Victoria, and Alexandra was the eldest daughter of Christian IX of Denmark. Maud was christened "Maud Charlotte Mary Victoria" at Marlborough House by John Jackson, Bishop of London, on 24 December. Her godparents were her paternal uncle Prince Leopold, for whom the Duke of Cambridge stood proxy; Prince Frederick William of Hesse-Kassel, for whom Prince Francis of Teck stood proxy; Count Gleichen; the Duchess of Nassau, for whom Princess Francis of Teck stood proxy; Charles XV of Sweden, for whom Swedish minister Baron Hochschild stood proxy; Princess Marie of Leiningen, for whom Princess Claudine of Teck stood proxy; her maternal aunt the Tsarevna of Russia for whom Baroness de Brunnow stood proxy; Crown Princess Louise of Denmark, for whom Madame de Bülow, wife of the Danish minister, stood proxy; and her great-great-aunt the Duchess of Inverness.

Growing up, Maud had a love for all outdoor sports. She was described as having a 'kind and cheerful disposition.' Of her sisters, she was the most attractive. 'She did look so pretty and fresh,' wrote the Empress Frederick of Maud in 1895, 'like a little rose, with her bright eyes and dear intelligent expression.'

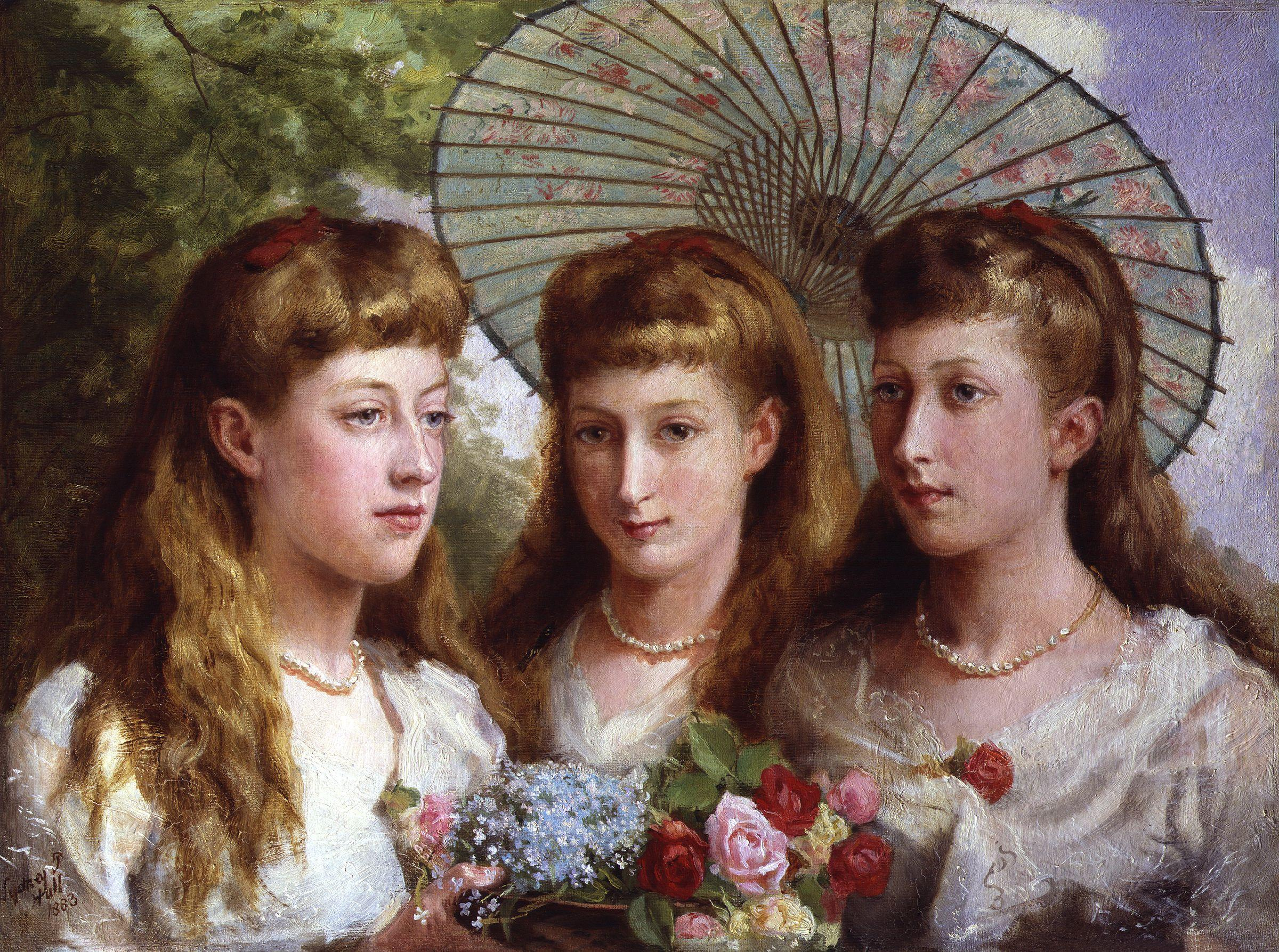
Maud with her sisters Louise and Victoria. Painting by Sydney Prior Hall, 1883

The tomboyish Maud was known as "Harry" to the royal family, after Edward VII's friend Admiral Henry Keppel, whose conduct in the Crimean War was considered particularly courageous at the time. Maud took part in almost all the annual visits to the Princess of Wales's family gatherings in Denmark and later accompanied her mother and sisters on cruises to Norway and the Mediterranean. She was a bridesmaid at the 1885 wedding of her paternal aunt Beatrice to Prince Henry of Battenberg, and at the wedding of her brother George to Mary of Teck in 1893.

Maud, along with her sisters, Victoria and Louise, received the Imperial Order of the Crown of India from their grandmother Queen Victoria on 6 August 1887. Like her sisters, she also held the Royal Order of Victoria and Albert (First Class) and was a Dame Grand Cross of the Order of the Hospital of St. John of Jerusalem.

== Princess of Denmark ==
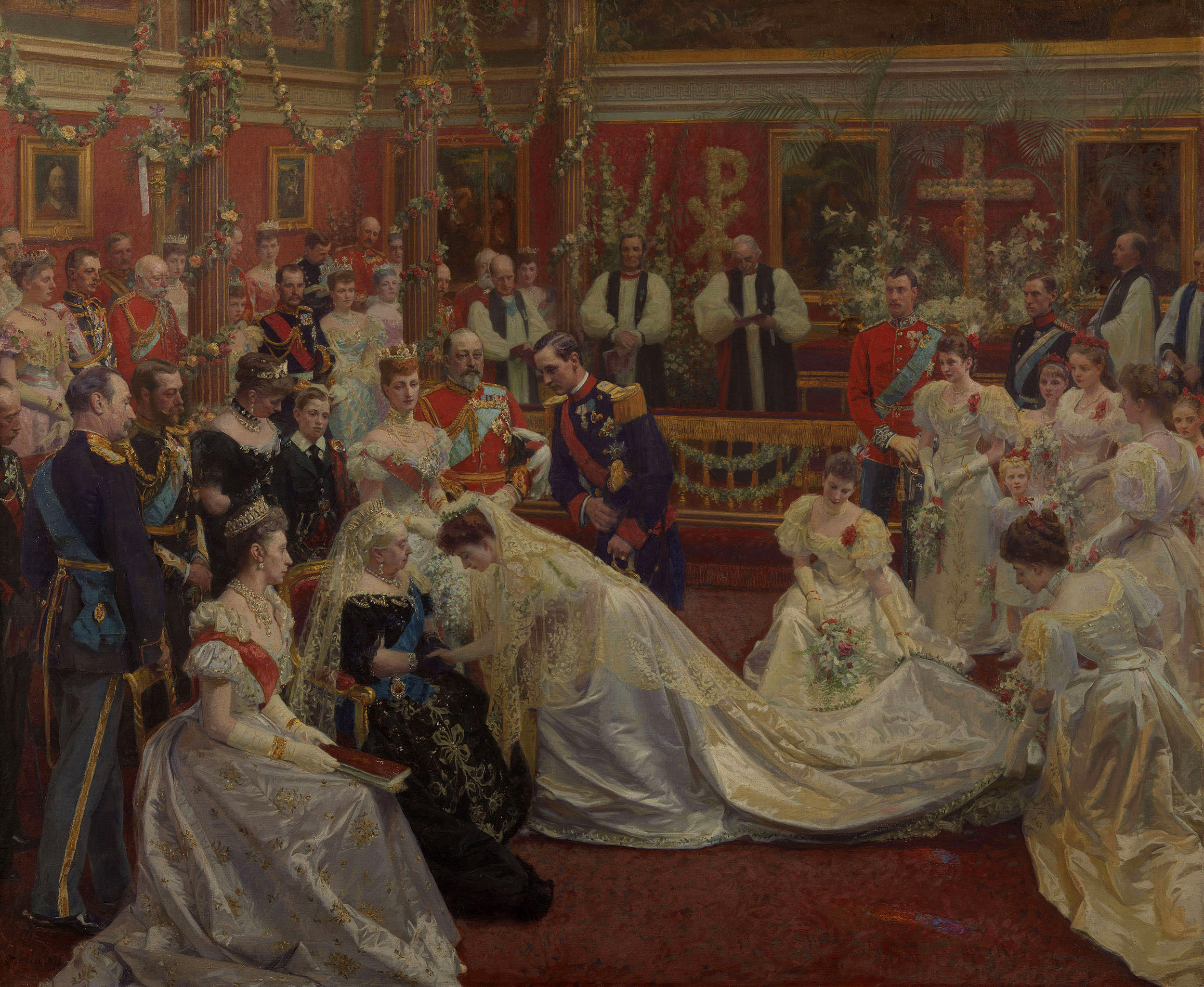
The Marriage of Princess Maud of Wales by Laurits Tuxen

Maud married relatively late, waiting until her late twenties to find a husband. She had initially wanted to marry a distant cousin, Prince Francis of Teck, younger brother of her sister-in-law Mary. Despite being relatively impoverished from mounting gambling debts and being in a position to possibly benefit from Maud's status, he ignored her.

There had been talk of Maud becoming a possible candidate as the wife of Prince Christian of Denmark, along with her sister, Victoria. The idea petered out, but in the following year, 1895, Prince Christian's younger brother, Prince Carl of Denmark, began paying court to Princess Maud. Carl and Maud had known each other all their lives. On the Princess of Wales's frequent visits to her father's court, her children and the children of her brother, the Crown Prince Frederik, had always played their boisterous games together. Prince Carl was twenty-two years of age; a tall, fair, slender, good-natured, and level-headed young man. The Duchess of Teck considered him very good-looking. 'He seems charming!' she wrote, 'but looks fully three years younger than Maud, has no money.' Nevertheless, during one of those Danish family gatherings at Fredensborg, Prince Carl proposed and Princess Maud accepted. The couple were officially engaged in October 1895, and the engagement caused much delight to Queen Victoria.

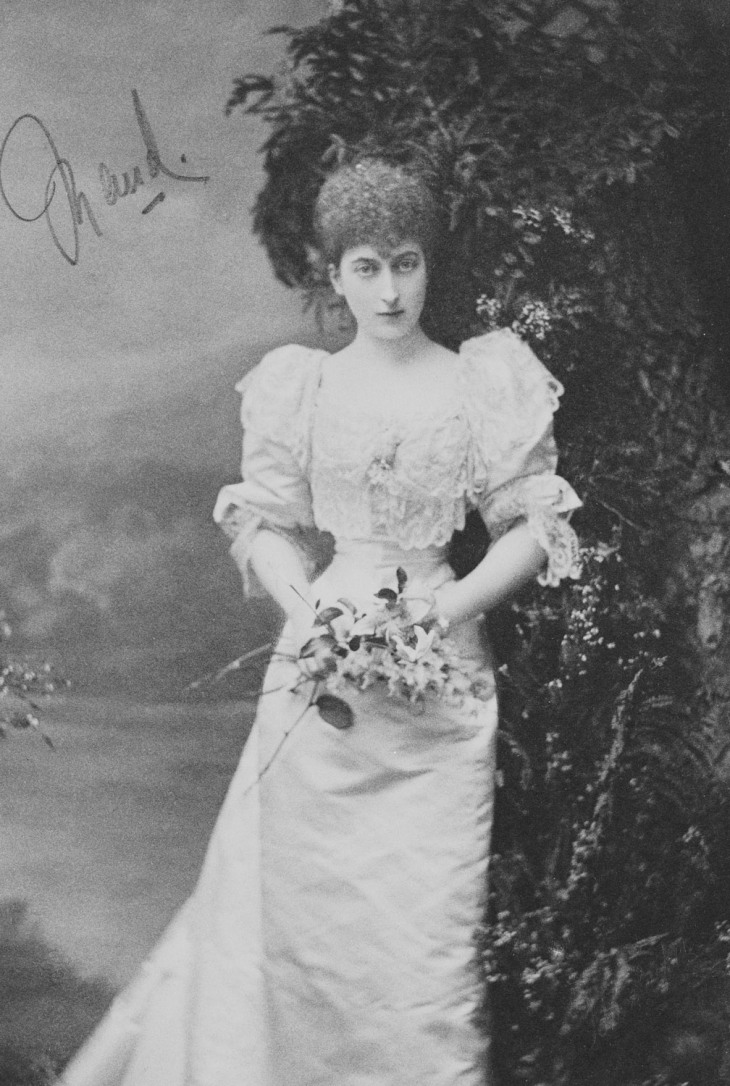
Maud, 1897

On 22 July 1896, Maud married her first cousin, Prince Carl of Denmark, in the private chapel at Buckingham Palace. Carl was the second son of Queen Alexandra's eldest brother, Crown Prince Frederik of Denmark, and Princess Louise of Sweden. The bride's father gave them Appleton House on the Sandringham Estate as a country residence for her frequent visits to England. It was there that the couple's only child, Prince Alexander, was born on 2 July 1903.

While in Denmark, Maud was often homesick and preferred her native English customs; her talk, interests, and pursuits were those of English county society. She was never happier than when gardening, riding, bicycling, or driving a wagonette. Although her Copenhagen home, a suite of twelve rooms in what was known as Bernstorff Mansion beside the Amalienborg Palace, was furnished 'to reflect English taste', she was still dissatisfied. However, she divided her time between her little mansion in Copenhagen and Appleton House, her adored English country home. The responsibilities of marriage and motherhood had made very little difference to Maud's looks, personality, or way of life. With her piled coiffure, her high collars, and her small, slim-waisted figure, she was still like an echo of her mother.

Carl served as an officer in the Royal Danish Navy, and he and his family lived mainly in Denmark until 1905. In June 1905, the Norwegian Storting dissolved Norway's 91-year-old union with Sweden and voted to offer the throne to Prince Carl of Denmark. Maud's being a British royal played some part in why Carl was chosen. Following a plebiscite in November, Prince Carl accepted the Norwegian throne as King Haakon VII, while his young son was renamed Olav. King Haakon VII and Queen Maud were crowned at Nidaros Cathedral in Trondheim on 22 June 1906; there has not been a coronation in Scandinavia since.

== Queen of Norway ==
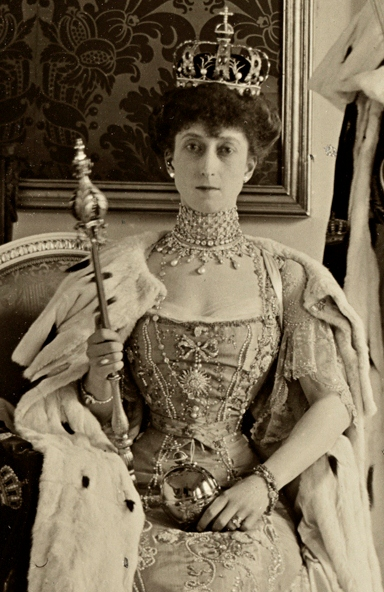
Maud following her coronation, wearing the Queen's Crown, and holding a sceptre and orb

Queen Maud quickly adapted to her new country and duties as a queen consort. A court was formed, and Marie Magdalena Rustad was appointed her principal lady-in-waiting. Maud played a strong and dominant role within the court and family, but a discreet role in public.

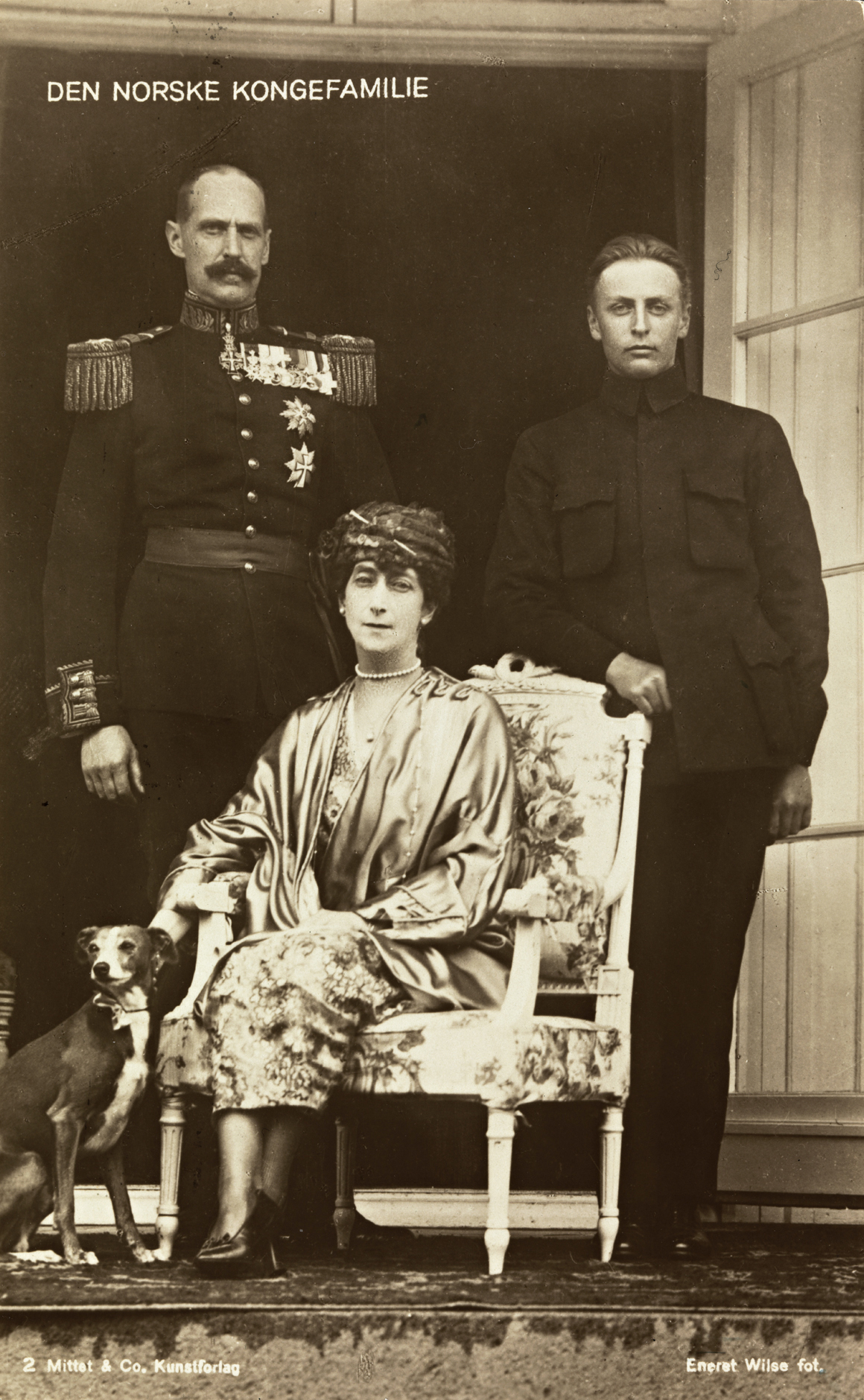
Queen Maud with her husband and their son in July 1921.

During her first years in Norway, she and her husband were photographed in Norwegian folk costumes, and enjoying winter sports such as skiing, to give them a Norwegian appearance in the eyes of the public. She disliked representation but performed her role as a queen with great care, and used clothes and jewellery to make a regal impression. She supported charitable causes, particularly those associated with children and animals, and gave encouragement to musicians and artists. Among her projects was Dronningens Hjelpekomité (the Queen's Relief Committee) during World War I. She supported the feminist Katti Anker Møller's home for unwed mothers (1906), which was regarded as radical, designed furniture for the benefit of the Barnets utstilling (Children's Exhibition) 1921, and sold photographs for charitable purposes. An avid rider, Maud insisted that the stables of the royal palace in Oslo be upgraded. Maud supervised much of this project herself and was greatly inspired by the Royal Mews in London when the stables were expanded.

Maud continued to regard England as her true home even after she arrived in Norway, and visited every year. She mostly stayed at her Appleton House, Sandringham, during her visits. She did, however, also appreciate some aspects of Norway, such as the winter sports. She supported bringing up her son as a Norwegian. She learned to ski and arranged for English gardens at Kongsseteren, the royal lodge overlooking Oslo, and at the summer residence at Bygdøy. She is described as reserved as a public person but energetic and with a taste for practical jokes as a private person.

Maud's last public appearance in Britain was at the coronation of King George VI and Queen Elizabeth in May 1937 at Westminster Abbey. She sat in the royal pew at Westminster Abbey next to her sister-in-law Queen Mary and her niece Mary, Princess Royal, as part of the official royal party.

Maud also acquired a reputation for dressing in fashionable chic. An exhibition of numerous items from her elegant wardrobe was held at the Victoria and Albert Museum in 2005 and published in the catalogue Style and Splendour: Queen Maud of Norway's Wardrobe 1896–1938.

== Death and legacy ==
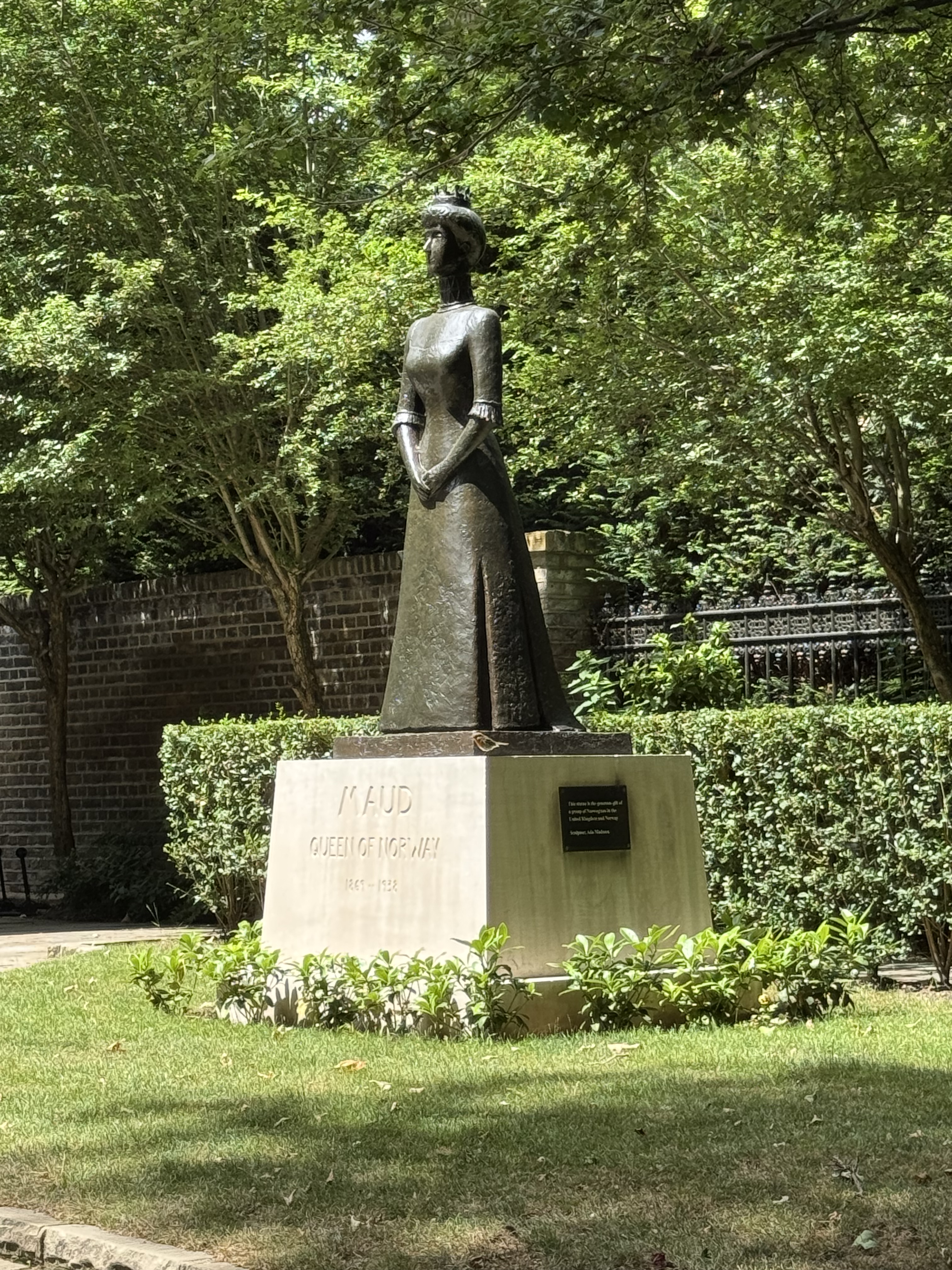
Queen Maud statue at 10 Palace Green in London (June 2025)

Maud visited England in October 1938. Initially, she stayed at Sandringham, but then moved into a hotel in London's West End. She became seriously ill and was taken to a nursing home at 18 Bentinck Street, Marylebone, London, where an abdominal operation was performed on 16 November 1938, during which advanced cancer was discovered. According to Norwegian author and biographer Tor Bomann-Larsen, Queen Maud's primary tumour was located in the ovary, with secondary spread throughout the abdomen.

King Haakon immediately travelled from Norway to her bedside. Although she survived the surgery, Maud died unexpectedly of heart failure on 20 November 1938, on the 13th anniversary of her mother's death. At the time of her death, Maud was the last surviving child of King Edward VII and Queen Alexandra. Norwegian newspapers were allowed to break the law forbidding publication on Sundays to notify the Norwegian public of her death. King Haakon returned Appleton House to the British royal family.

Her body was returned to Norway on board HMS Royal Oak, the flagship of the Second Battle Squadron of the Royal Navy's Home Fleet. Her body was moved to a small church in Oslo before the burial. Maud was buried in the royal mausoleum at Akershus Castle in Oslo. Her will was sealed in London in 1939. Her estate in England and Wales was valued at £7,941 (or £362,400 in 2022 when adjusted for inflation).

Queen Maud Land and Queen Maud Mountains in Antarctica; Queen Maud Secondary School in Hong Kong; and Queen Maud Gulf (including Queen Maud Gulf Migratory Bird Sanctuary) in Nunavut, Canada, are named after Maud. The ship Maud, designed to the specifications of Roald Amundsen for service in the Arctic Ocean and launched in 1916 to traverse and explore the Northeast Passage, was christened in honour of Maud of Wales. The replenishment ship HNoMS Maud of the Royal Norwegian Navy has also been named for her. The Queen Maud fromage (a sweet dessert) is named after her.

== Titles, styles, and arms ==
=== Titles and styles ===
- 26 November 1869 – 22 July 1896: Her Royal Highness Princess Maud of Wales
- 22 July 1896 – 18 November 1905: Her Royal Highness Princess Charles of Denmark
- 18 November 1905 – 20 November 1938: Her Majesty The Queen of Norway

=== Arms ===
Upon her marriage, Maud was granted the use of a personal coat of arms, being those of the kingdom, with an inescutcheon of the shield of Saxony, differenced with a label argent of five points, the outer pair and centre bearing hearts gules, the inner pair crosses gules. The inescutcheon was dropped by royal warrant in 1917.

Maud's coat of arms (granted 1896) until 1917

Royal monogram as Queen of Norway

== Ancestry ==
Ancestors of Maud of Wales

8. Ernest I, Duke of Saxe-Coburg and Gotha
4. Prince Albert of Saxe-Coburg and Gotha
9. Princess Louise of Saxe-Gotha-Altenburg
2. Edward VII of the United Kingdom
10. Prince Edward, Duke of Kent and Strathearn
5. Queen Victoria of the United Kingdom
11. Princess Victoria of Saxe-Coburg-Saalfeld
1. Princess Maud of Wales
12. Frederick William, Duke of Schleswig-Holstein-Sonderburg-Glücksburg
6. Christian IX of Denmark
13. Princess Louise Caroline of Hesse-Kassel
3. Princess Alexandra of Denmark
14. Prince William of Hesse-Kassel
7. Princess Louise of Hesse-Kassel
15. Princess Charlotte of Denmark

Maud of Wales House of Saxe-Coburg and Gotha Cadet branch of the House of Wettin Born: 26 November 1869 Died: 20 November 1938
Norwegian royalty
Vacant Title last held by Sophia of Nassau	Queen consort of Norway; 1905–1938	Vacant Title next held by Sonja Haraldsen
