= Appleton House, Sandringham =

Country house in Norfolk, England

Appleton House was a 19th-century country house on the Sandringham Estate in Norfolk, England. It was originally built in the 1860s as a farmhouse, but was later converted into a modern house.

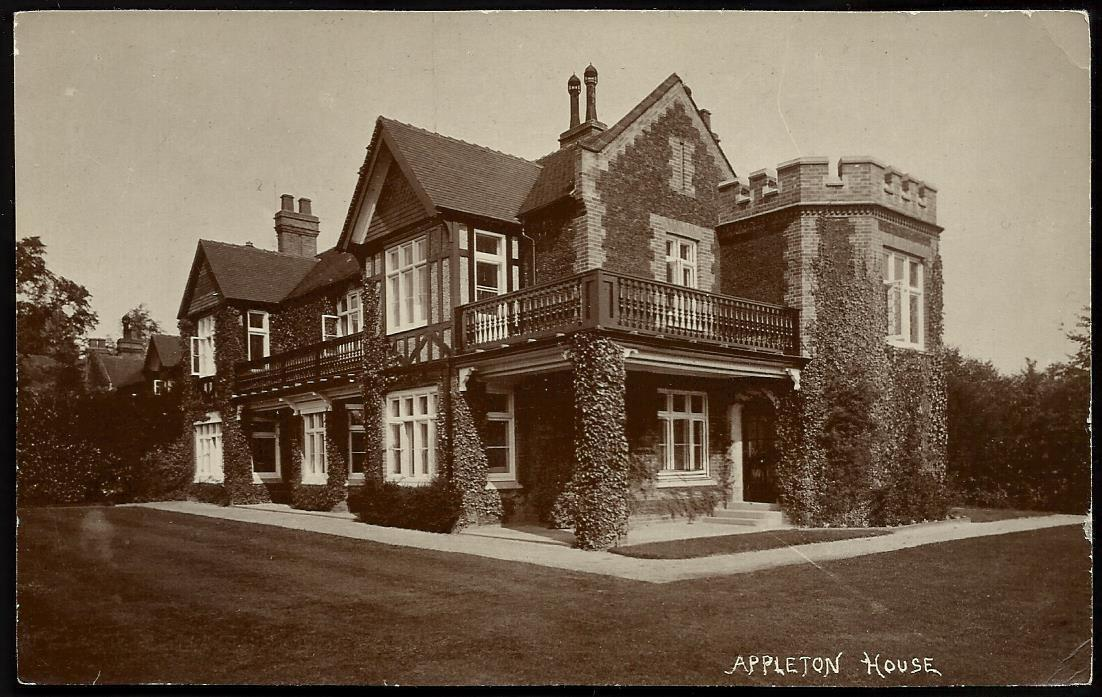
Appleton House, c. 1929

== History ==
Appleton House began as a farmhouse and was later modernised. The property was initially the home of Gerard and Louisa Mary Cresswell of King's Lynn, who were the tenants of Appleton Farm. The Cresswells had prolonged disputes with Edward VII, then Prince of Wales, and his estate staff, particularly regarding the damage caused by royal shooting parties to their crops. These conflicts, along with financial difficulties, led to them receiving a notice to quit the farm in 1880.

It was later acquired by Princess Maud and Prince Carl of Denmark (later King Haakon VII of Norway) as a wedding gift from the bride's parents in July 1896. The residence was presented to the couple as a private retreat to use during their stays in England. The Prince of Wales wrote to his brother-in-law, Crown Prince Frederik of Denmark, "I have given Maud and Charles a small house, their own country retreat, about one mile from here, they will always have a pied-à-terre when they come over to England. I know they will appreciate this very much."

Queen Maud became very fond of Appleton, "Our little house is a perfect paradise." The future King Olav V of Norway was born there in 1903.

In November 1938, Queen Maud died unexpectedly. Two days after Queen Maud's burial, King Haakon wrote to King George VI to inform him that Appleton House would be returned to the British royal family.

During World War II, Sandringham House was deemed unsafe primarily due to its vulnerability to aerial attacks, so King George VI, Queen Elizabeth and Princesses Elizabeth and Margaret took up residence at Appleton. Queen Mary also stayed at Appleton for a time after the war.

Appleton House ceased to function as a royal residence and gradually fell into disrepair. The site was partially surrounded by an air-raid shelter built during World War II, which by the 1960s was considered too costly to remove. The house was ultimately demolished in July 1984.
