= Outline of Norway =

Country in Scandinavia in Northern Europe

The Flag of Norway

The Coat of arms of Norway

The location of Norway

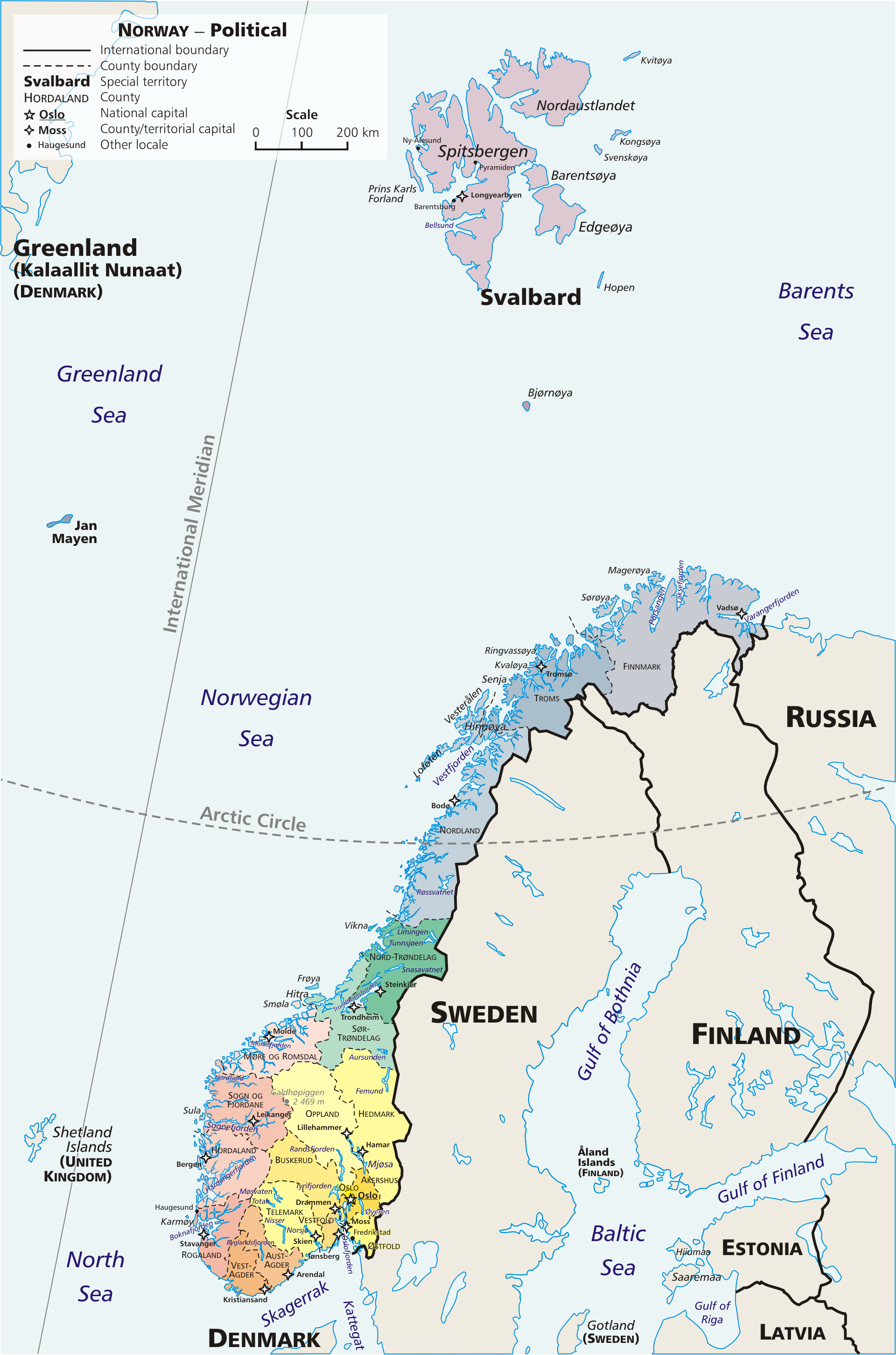
An enlargeable map of the Kingdom of Norway

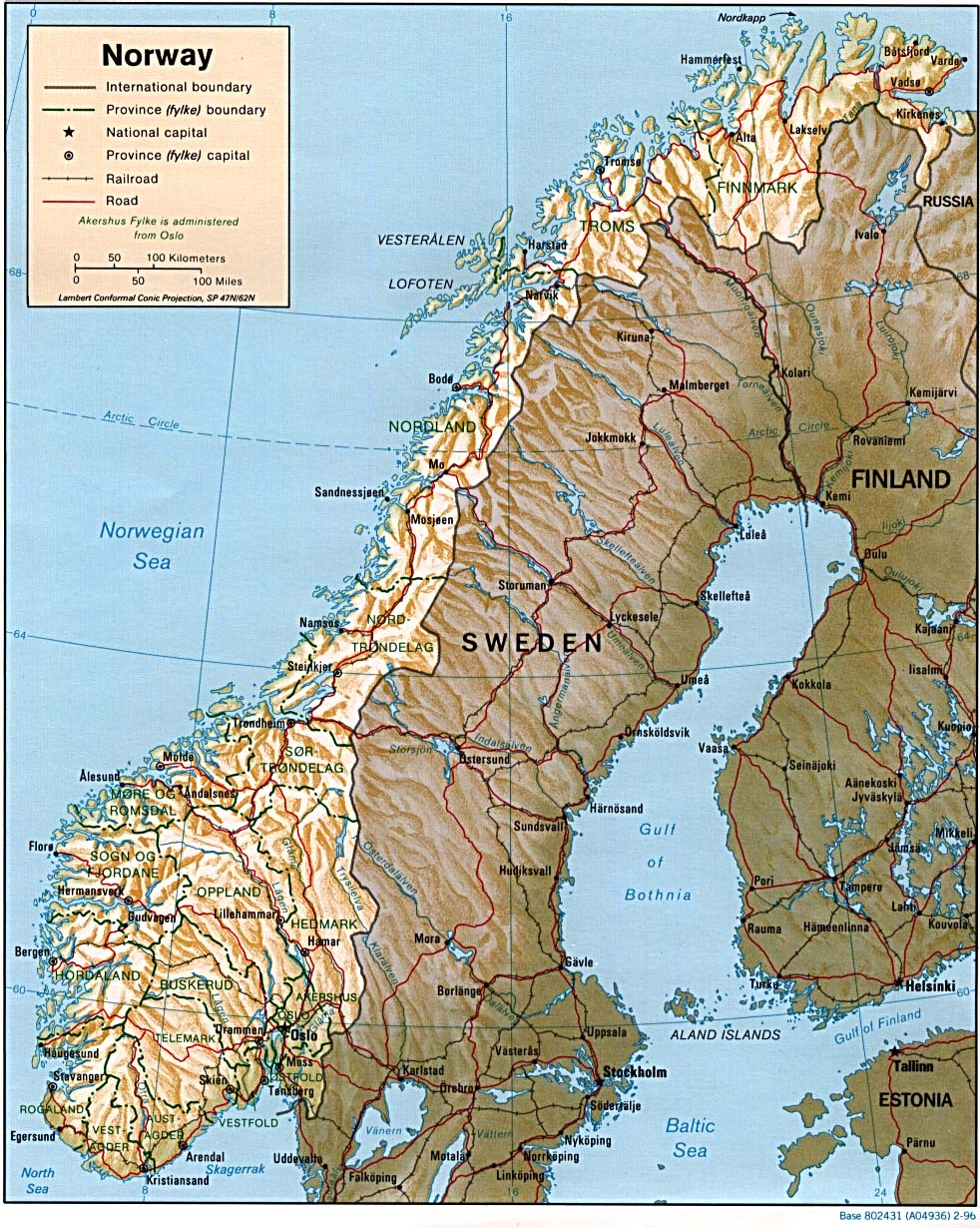
An enlargeable map of continental Norway

The following outline provides an overview of, and topical guide to, the Kingdom of Norway.

Norway is a sovereign constitutional monarchy, located principally in the western part of Scandinavia in Northern Europe. The country has land borders with Sweden, Finland, and Russia, while the United Kingdom and the Faroe Islands lie to its west across the North Sea and Denmark to its south across the Skagerrak strait. The country's long and glaciated Atlantic coastline is deeply indented by fjords, rising precipitously to high plateaux.

Norway also includes the Arctic island territories of Svalbard and Jan Mayen. Norwegian sovereignty over Svalbard is based upon the Spitsbergen Treaty, but that treaty does not apply to Jan Mayen. Bouvet Island in the South Atlantic Ocean and Peter I Island and Queen Maud Land in Antarctica are external dependencies, but those three entities do not form part of the kingdom.

Since World War II, Norway has experienced rapid economic growth, and is now amongst the wealthiest countries in the world. (Note: See List of countries by GDP (nominal) per capita, List of countries by GDP (PPP) per capita, and List of countries by current account balance.) Norway is the world's third largest oil exporter after Russia and Saudi Arabia and the petroleum industry accounts for around a quarter of GDP. It has also rich resources of gas fields, hydropower, fish, forests, and minerals. Norway was the second largest exporter of seafood (in value, after China) in 2006. Other main industries include food processing, shipbuilding, metals, chemicals, mining and pulp and paper products. Norway has a Scandinavian welfare system and the largest capital reserve per capita of any nation.

Norway was ranked highest of all countries in human development from 2001 to 2006, and came second in 2007 (to fellow Nordic country Iceland). (Note: Human Development Index. Note that although Norway and Iceland's scores are the same to three decimal places, Iceland ranks higher when the decimal is expanded.) It also rated the most peaceful country in the world in a 2007 survey by Global Peace Index. It is a founding member of NATO.

== General reference ==
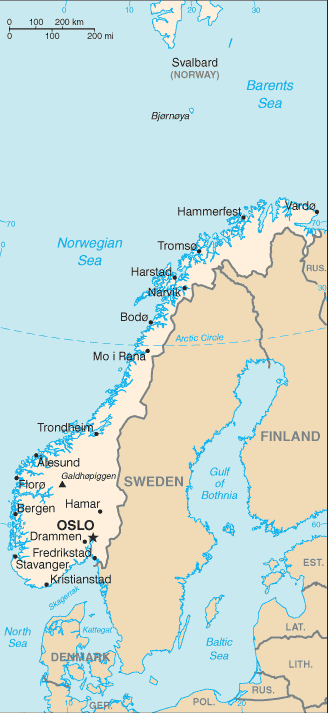
An enlargeable basic map of Norway

- Pronunciation: /ˈnɔː(r).weɪ/
- Common English country name: Norway
- Official English country name: The Kingdom of Norway
- Common endonym(s): Norge (Bokmål), Noreg (Nynorsk), Norga (Northern Sami), Vuodna (Lule Sami) or Nöörje (Southern Sami)
- Official endonym(s): Kongeriket Norge (Bokmål), Kongeriket Noreg (Nynorsk), Norgga gonagasriika (Northern Sami), Vuona gånågisrijkka (Lule Sami) or Nöörjen gånkarïjhke (Southern Sami)
- Adjectival(s): Norwegian
- Demonym(s): Norwegian(s)
- Etymology: Name of Norway
- ISO country codes: NO, NOR, 578
- ISO region codes: See ISO 3166-2:NO
- Internet country code top-level domain: .no

== Geography of Norway ==
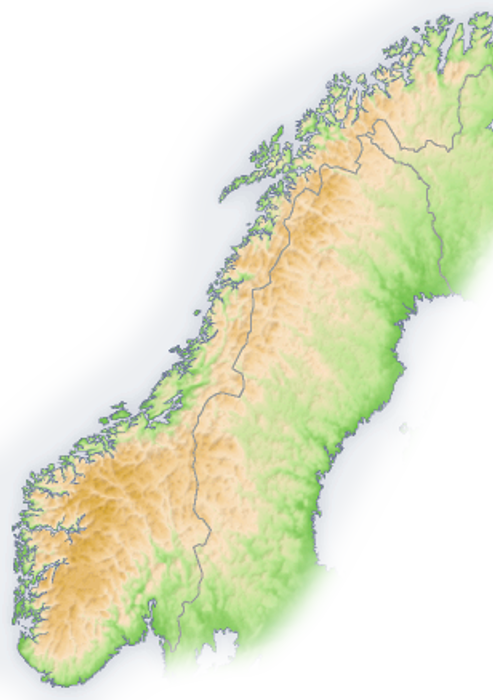
An enlargeable topographic map of Norway

Geography of Norway

- Norway is: a Nordic country
  - A member state of NATO
- Location:
  - Northern Hemisphere and Eastern Hemisphere
  - Eurasia
    - Europe
      - Northern Europe
        - Scandinavia
  - Time zone: Central European Time (UTC+01), Central European Summer Time (UTC+02)
  - Extreme points of Norway
    - High: Galdhøpiggen 2,469 m (8,100 ft)
    - Low: Norwegian Sea 0 m
  - Land boundaries: 2,542 km

Sweden 1,619 km
Finland 727 km
Russia 196 km

- Coastline: 83,281 km

- Population of Norway: 5,367,580
- Area of Norway: 385,252 km^{2}
- Atlas of Norway

=== Environment of Norway ===
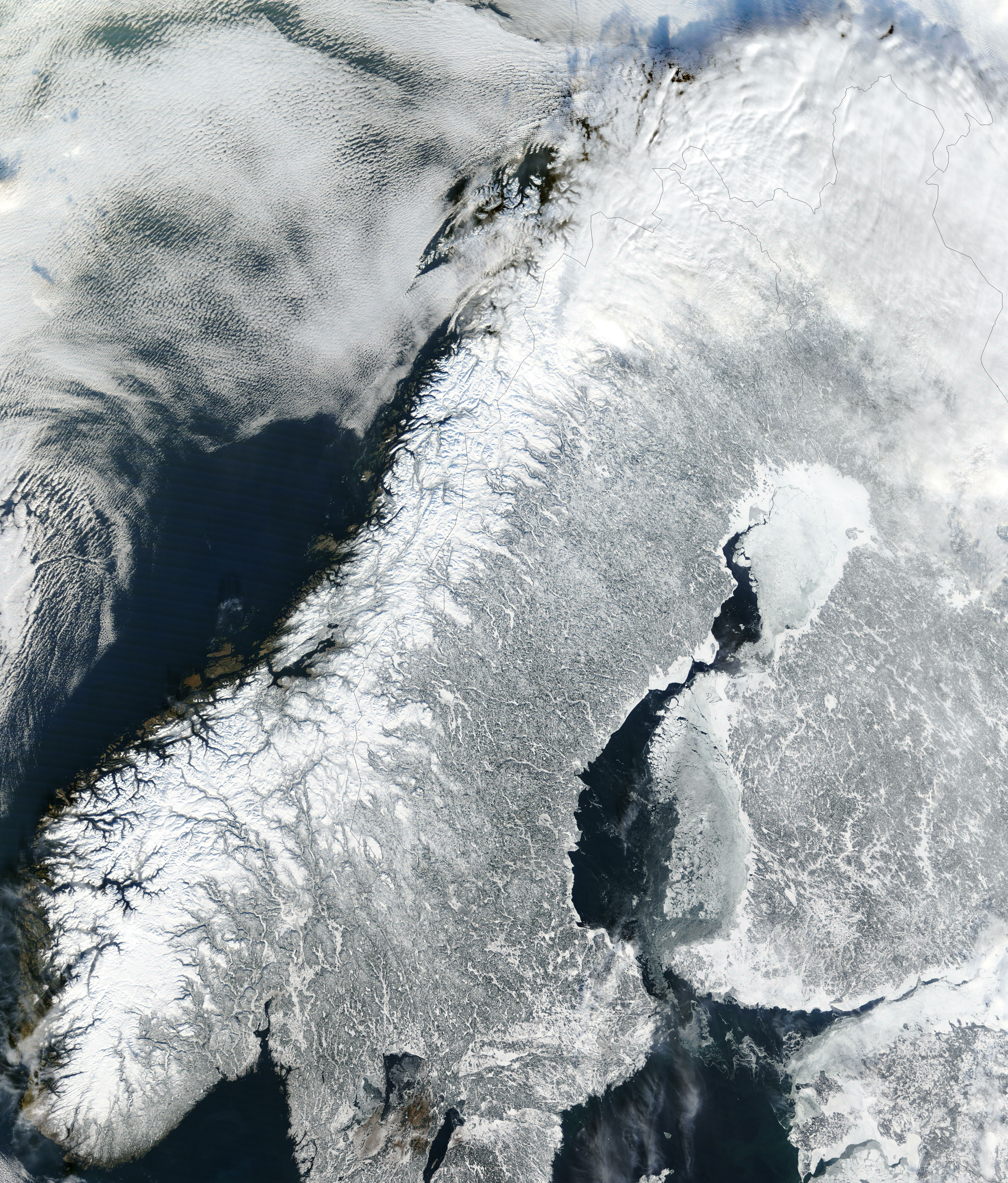
An enlargeable satellite image of Norway

- Climate of Norway
- Festningen Geotope Protected Area
- Renewable energy in Norway
- Geology of Norway
- Protected areas of Norway
  - Biosphere reserves in Norway
  - National parks of Norway
- Wildlife of Norway
  - Fauna of Norway
    - Birds of Norway
    - Mammals of Norway

==== Natural geographic features of Norway ====
- Fjords of Norway
- Glaciers of Norway
- Islands of Norway
- Lakes of Norway
- Mountains of Norway
  - Volcanoes in Norway
- Rivers of Norway
- World Heritage Sites in Norway

=== Regions of Norway ===
Regions of Norway

==== Ecoregions of Norway ====
List of ecoregions in Norway

- Ecoregions in Norway

==== Administrative divisions of Norway ====
Administrative divisions of Norway

- Districts of Norway (historical)
- Counties of Norway (modern)
  - Municipalities of Norway

===== Districts of Norway =====
Districts of Norway

- List of traditional Norwegian districts

===== Counties of Norway =====
Counties of Norway

- Capital of Norway: Oslo
- List of Norwegian counties

===== Municipalities of Norway =====
Municipalities of Norway

- Capital of Norway: Oslo
- Cities of Norway

=== Demography of Norway ===
Demographics of Norway

== Government and politics of Norway ==
Politics of Norway

- Form of government: unitary parliamentary, representative democratic constitutional monarchy
- Capital of Norway: Oslo
- Elections in Norway
- Political parties in Norway
- Taxation in Norway

=== Monarchy of Norway ===
- Monarchy of Norway
  - History of the Norwegian monarchy
  - Norwegian royal family
    - Family tree of Norwegian monarchs
    - Succession to the Norwegian throne
      1. Princess Ingrid Alexandra of Norway
      2. Prince Sverre Magnus of Norway
      3. Princess Märtha Louise of Norway
    - Coronations in Norway
  - Norwegian order of precedence
  - Regalia of Norway
    - Norwegian Crown Prince's Coronet
    - Queen of Norway's Crown
  - Royal mottos of Norwegian monarchs
  - Royal Police Escort
  - Thrones of Norway
- Republicanism in Norway

=== Branches of the government of Norway ===
Government of Norway

==== Executive branch of the government of Norway ====
- Head of state: Haakon VIII, King of Norway
- Head of government: Jonas Gahr Støre, Prime Minister of Norway
- Cabinet of Norway

==== Legislative branch of the government of Norway ====
- Parliament of Norway (unicameral)

==== Judicial branch of the government of Norway ====
Court system of Norway

- Supreme Court of Norway

=== Foreign relations of Norway ===
Foreign relations of Norway

- Diplomatic missions in Norway
- Diplomatic missions of Norway

==== International organization membership ====
The Kingdom of Norway is a member of:

- African Development Bank Group (AfDB) (nonregional member)
- Arctic Council
- Asian Development Bank (ADB) (nonregional member)
- Australia Group
- Bank for International Settlements (BIS)
- Confederation of European Paper Industries (CEPI)
- Council of Europe (CE)
- Council of the Baltic Sea States (CBSS)
- Euro-Atlantic Partnership Council (EAPC)
- European Bank for Reconstruction and Development (EBRD)
- European Free Trade Association (EFTA)
- European Organization for Nuclear Research (CERN)
- European Space Agency (ESA)
- Food and Agriculture Organization (FAO)
- Inter-American Development Bank (IADB)
- International Atomic Energy Agency (IAEA)
- International Bank for Reconstruction and Development (IBRD)
- International Chamber of Commerce (ICC)
- International Civil Aviation Organization (ICAO)
- International Criminal Court (ICCt)
- International Criminal Police Organization (Interpol)
- International Development Association (IDA)
- International Energy Agency (IEA)
- International Federation of Red Cross and Red Crescent Societies (IFRCS)
- International Finance Corporation (IFC)
- International Fund for Agricultural Development (IFAD)
- International Hydrographic Organization (IHO)
- International Labour Organization (ILO)
- International Maritime Organization (IMO)
- International Mobile Satellite Organization (IMSO)
- International Monetary Fund (IMF)
- International Olympic Committee (IOC)
- International Organization for Migration (IOM)
- International Organization for Standardization (ISO)
- International Red Cross and Red Crescent Movement (ICRM)
- International Telecommunication Union (ITU)
- International Telecommunications Satellite Organization (ITSO)
- International Trade Union Confederation (ITUC)
- Inter-Parliamentary Union (IPU)
- Multilateral Investment Guarantee Agency (MIGA)
- Nonaligned Movement (NAM) (guest)
- Nordic Council (NC)
- Nordic Investment Bank (NIB)
- North Atlantic Treaty Organization (NATO)
- Nuclear Energy Agency (NEA)
- Nuclear Suppliers Group (NSG)
- Organisation for Economic Co-operation and Development (OECD)
- Organization for Security and Cooperation in Europe (OSCE)
- Organisation for the Prohibition of Chemical Weapons (OPCW)
- Organization of American States (OAS) (observer)
- Paris Club
- Permanent Court of Arbitration (PCA)
- Schengen Convention
- United Nations (UN)
- United Nations Conference on Trade and Development (UNCTAD)
- United Nations Educational, Scientific, and Cultural Organization (UNESCO)
- United Nations High Commissioner for Refugees (UNHCR)
- United Nations Industrial Development Organization (UNIDO)
- United Nations Institute for Training and Research (UNITAR)
- United Nations Interim Force in Lebanon (UNIFIL)
- United Nations Mission in the Sudan (UNMIS)
- United Nations Relief and Works Agency for Palestine Refugees in the Near East (UNRWA)
- United Nations Truce Supervision Organization (UNTSO)
- Universal Postal Union (UPU)
- Western European Union (WEU) (associate)
- World Customs Organization (WCO)
- World Federation of Trade Unions (WFTU)
- World Health Organization (WHO)
- World Intellectual Property Organization (WIPO)
- World Meteorological Organization (WMO)
- World Tourism Organization (UNWTO)
- World Trade Organization (WTO)
- Zangger Committee (ZC)

=== Law and order in Norway ===
Law of Norway

- Capital punishment in Norway
- Constitution of Norway
- Crime in Norway
- Domestic violence in Norway
- Human rights in Norway
  - LGBT rights in Norway
  - Freedom of religion in Norway
- Law enforcement in Norway

=== Military of Norway ===
Military of Norway

- Command
  - Commander-in-chief:
    - Ministry of Defence of Norway
- Forces
  - Army of Norway
  - Navy of Norway
  - Air Force of Norway
  - Special forces of Norway
- Military history of Norway
- Military ranks of Norway

=== Local government in Norway ===
Local government in Norway

== History of Norway ==
History of Norway

- Military history of Norway

== Culture of Norway ==
Culture of Norway

- Architecture of Norway
  - Vernacular architecture in Norway
- Cuisine of Norway
- Languages of Norway
- Media in Norway
- Museums in Norway
- National symbols of Norway
  - Coat of arms of Norway
  - Flag of Norway
    - List of Norwegian flags
  - National anthem of Norway
- People of Norway
  - List of Norwegians
    - List of Norwegian architects
    - List of Norwegian mathematicians
      - Niels Henrik Abel
        - List of things named after Niels Henrik Abel
          - Abel Prize
      - Carl Anton Bjerknes
      - Vilhelm Bjerknes
      - Bernt Michael Holmboe
      - Sophus Lie
      - Idun Reiten
      - Atle Selberg
      - Thoralf Skolem
      - Carl Størmer
    - List of Norwegian sportspeople
      - Erling Haaland
    - List of Norwegian writers
      - List of Norwegian women writers
      - Henrik Ibsen
- Prostitution in Norway
- Public holidays in Norway
- Religion in Norway
  - Buddhism in Norway
  - Christianity in Norway
    - Church of Norway
    - Roman Catholicism in Norway
    - Pentecostalism in Norway
    - Evangelical Lutheran Free Church of Norway
    - Eastern Orthodoxy in Norway
    - Oriental Orthodoxy in Norway
    - Baptism in Norway
    - Adventism in Norway
  - Hinduism in Norway
  - Islam in Norway
    - Ahmadiyya in Norway
  - Judaism in Norway
- World Heritage Sites in Norway

=== Art in Norway ===
- Cinema of Norway
  - Lists of Norwegian films
    - List of Norwegian films before 1930
    - List of Norwegian films of the 1930s
    - List of Norwegian films of the 1940s
    - List of Norwegian films of the 1950s
    - List of Norwegian films of the 1960s
    - List of Norwegian films of the 1970s
    - List of Norwegian films of the 1980s
    - List of Norwegian films of the 1990s
    - List of Norwegian films of the 2000s
    - List of Norwegian films of the 2010s
    - List of Norwegian films of the 2020s
- Literature of Norway
  - List of Norwegian writers
- Music of Norway
  - List of Norwegian musicians
- Television in Norway
  - List of Norwegian television series
  - List of Norwegian television channels

=== Sports in Norway ===
- Football in Norway
- Norway at the Olympics
- Rugby league in Norway

== Economy and infrastructure of Norway ==
Economy of Norway

- Economic rank, by nominal GDP (2007): 23rd (twenty-third)
- Agriculture in Norway
- Banking in Norway
  - National Bank of Norway
- Communications in Norway
  - Internet in Norway
- Companies of Norway
- Currency of Norway: Krone
  - ISO 4217: NOK
- Energy in Norway
  - Energy policy of Norway
  - Oil industry in Norway
- Health care in Norway
- Mining in Norway
- Oslo Stock Exchange
- Tourism in Norway
- Transport in Norway
  - Airports in Norway
  - Rail transport in Norway
  - Roads in Norway
- Whaling in Norway
- Water supply and sanitation in Norway

== Education in Norway ==
Education in Norway

== See also ==
Norway

- Index of Norway-related articles
- List of international rankings
- Member states of the North Atlantic Treaty Organization
- Member states of the United Nations
- Outline of Europe
- Outline of geography
