= Human rights in Norway =

Coordinates: 61°N 8°E

Human rights in Norway protect the fundamental rights of all persons within the Kingdom of Norway. These rights are safeguarded by Chapter E of the Constitution of Norway or Kongeriket Norges Grunnlov, as well as the ratification of various international treaties facilitated by the United Nations. The country maintains a dedicated commitment to human rights and was the second country to ratify the European Convention on Human Rights.

Although Norway is regarded as relatively proactive in human rights matters, ranking first in the UN Development Program's Human Development Index for 12 of the last 15 years, human rights issues still arise. The most prevalent issue in recent history is the struggle for land rights by the indigenous Sami people, under the threat of the Norwegian government exploiting the Sápmi region for natural resources.

== Sources of human rights ==
=== The Constitution of Norway ===
Section E. of the Norwegian Constitution pertains specifically to the maintenance of human rights of all people within the state of Norway. Individual rights are granted by various articles, most notably:

- Article 92 assures authorities of the State respect and ensure the relevant human rights outlined in the Constitution
- Article 93 guarantees the right to life, and freedom from the death penalty and torture
- Article 95 states the right to a fair trial, and makes judges and the courts independent
- Article 98 defines all people as equal
- Article 108 guarantees the preservation of Sami language, culture, and way of life
- Article 109 assures the right to an education

=== Universal Declaration of Human Rights (1948) ===
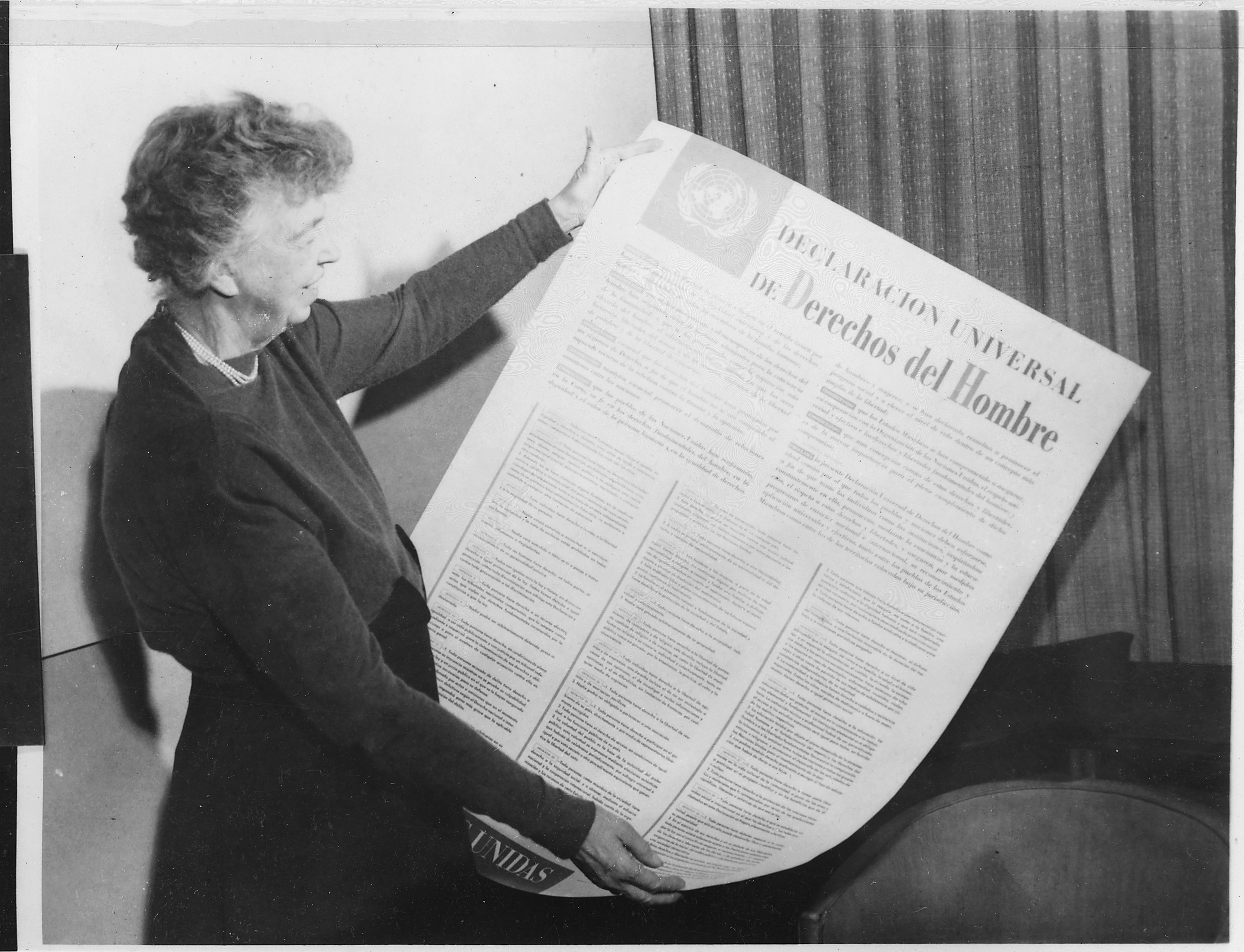
Eleanor Roosevelt holding the Universal Declaration of Human Rights

After the barbarities of World War 2, an international declaration was constructed to guarantee the rights of all humans on earth. Proclaimed by the newly constructed United Nations, at the General Assembly in Paris on 10 December 1948, the declaration signposted 30 key human rights that should be universally granted to every human. Although the Declaration is not legally binding in itself, subsequent international treaties, amendments to constitutions, and economic agreements affirm the declaration.

The Universal Declaration of Human Rights (UDHR) is seen as the precursor to the International Bill of Human Rights, which consists of the UDHR, as well as the International Covenant of Civil and Political Rights (ICCPR, 1966) and the International Covenant on Economic, Social, and Cultural Rights (ICESCR, 1996). This extension of the UDHR provided a legal reason for states to ensure the maintenance of human rights, in addition to the moral obligation established by the initial proclamation of the UDHR in 1948.

=== International Treaties ===
As well as the UDHR, and the International Bill of Human Rights, Norway has ratified a variety of other international treaties focused on the maintenance of human rights:, those include:

- Convention of the Prevention and Punishment of the Crime of Genocide (1948)
- Convention Relating to the Status of Refugees (1951)
- Convention on the Political Rights of Women (1952)
- Convention Relating to the Status of Stateless Persons (1954)
- Supplementary Convention on the Abolition of Slavery (1956)
- Convention on the Nationality of Married Women (1957)
- Convention on the Reduction of Statelessness (1961)
- Convention on Consent to Marriage, Minimum Age for Marriage and Registration of Marriages (1962)
- International Convention on the Elimination of All Forms of Racial Discrimination (1965)
- International Covenant on Economic, Social and Cultural Rights (1966)
- International Covenant on Civil and Political Rights (1966)
- First Optional Protocol to the International Covenant on Civil and Political Rights (1967)
- Convention on the Elimination of All Forms of Discrimination Against Women (1979)

== Civil and political rights ==
These liberties are granted by the Constitution of Norway:

=== Judicial rights ===
A variety of judicial rights are ensured under sections D and E of the Norwegian constitution. The constitution prohibits arbitrary arrest, and supports the detainee should they desire to challenge the lawfulness of an arrest. All persons within the state of Norway are eligible for a fair and public trial, where publicly funded access to a legal counsel of their choice is ensured. An independent and impartial judiciary is required under Norwegian law.

=== Capital punishment ===
Since 1948, there have been no instances of capital punishment in Norway. Any form of capital punishment was constitutionally abolished in 2014. The death sentence ended during peacetime in 1902, with the last peacetime execution being carried out in 1876. The most recent execution was of a Nazi collaborator in 1948. Not only is Norway's stance on capital punishment guarded by the constitution, but it is also ratified by the International Covenant on Civil and Political Rights (1972) and the Second Optional Protocol (1991).

=== Prison conditions ===
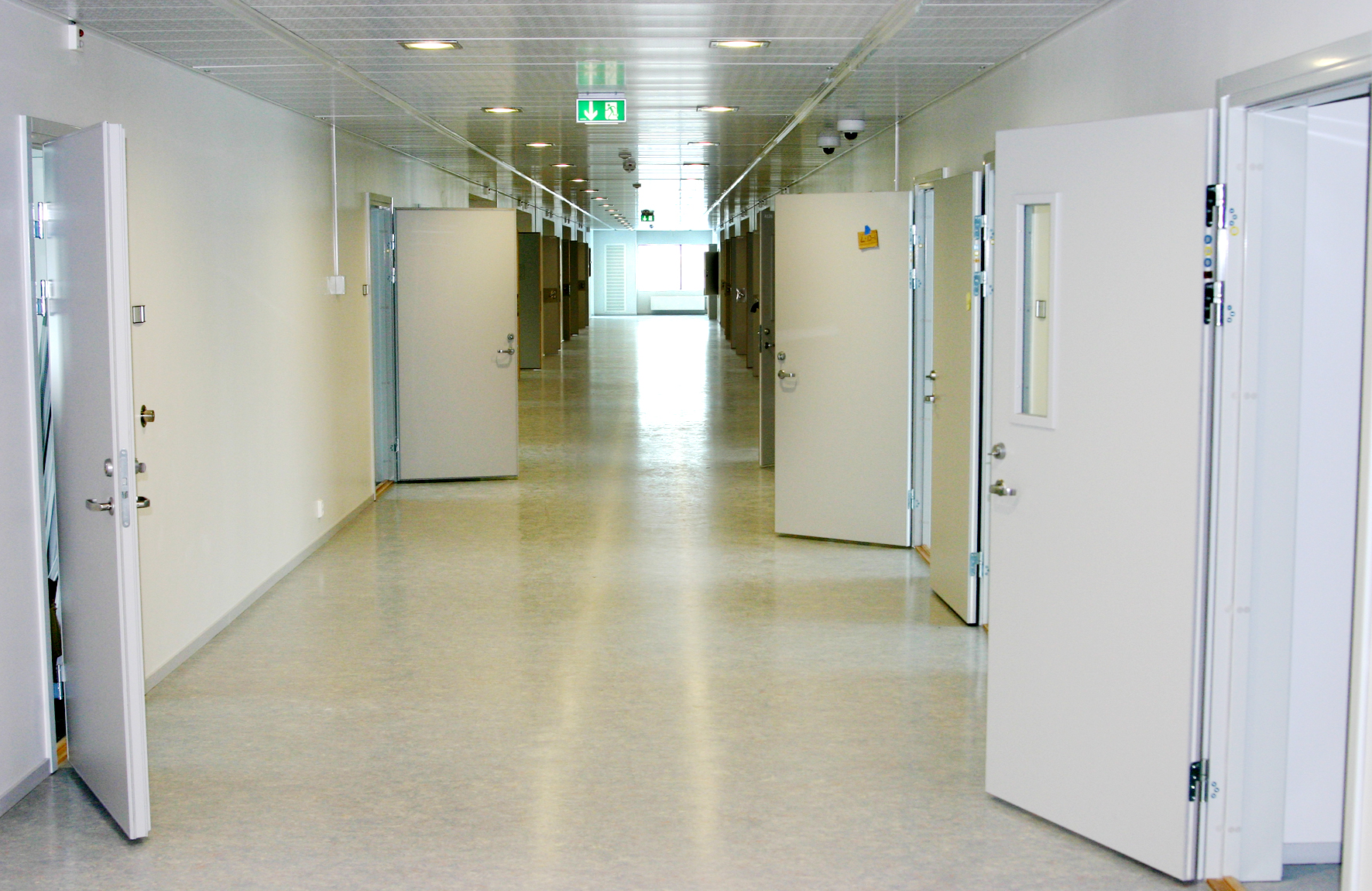
Interior of Halden Prison in Halden, Norway

The Norwegian prison system is praised as an exceptional model with extraordinarily low re-offending rates. The Norwegian model is focused on rehabilitation, rather than retribution, whereby the prison officers' main role is to mentor, not punish. Inside a Norwegian prison, human rights are guaranteed for the prisoners, with healthy food, exercise, and standard living conditions guaranteed. Guards and prisoners occupy the same spaces, eat the same meals, and participate in activities together, allowing personal bonds to develop to aid rehabilitation of the prisoners. This strategy is known as 'dynamic security'.

Are Hodiel, the Governor of Halden Prison, the second largest prison in Norway, explains that "In Norway, the punishment is to take away someone's liberty. The other rights stay". A spot at Halden Prison costs approximately £98,000 per inmate per year. This is expensive in comparison to the United Kingdom, where places cost between £40,000 and £59,000.

=== Religious freedoms ===
Religions in Norway (31.12.2018)
1. Lutheran Church (69.9%)
2. Catholic Church (3.02%)
3. Other Christian denominations (2.21%)
4. Islam (3.29%)
5. Secular Humanism (1.81%)
6. Unaffiliated (17.4%)
7. Other (2.40%)

The Norwegian Constitution states that "Our values will remain our Christian and humanistic heritage", and that "The King shall at all times profess the Evangelical-Lutheran religion". Yet Norway maintains complete freedom of religion for all inhabitants. This right is also included in the Norwegian constitution, which says that "All inhabitants of the realm shall have the right to free exercise of their religion."

The State has, and continues to, support the Church of Norway, which is an Evangelical-Lutheran church that follows the religion professed by the King of Norway. The religious community of Norway primarily belongs to the Church of Norway, yet there remain small populations of Muslims and Catholics. The second largest religious group in Norway is unaffiliated.

As well as funding the Church of Norway, the Norwegian government provides funding to over 800 religious groups, in an effort to maintain diversity and reduce religious discrimination. Religious persecution is punishable by law, through hefty fines and prison sentences of up to 6 months. Within Norway, complaints of religious discrimination are handled by the Equality and Anti-discrimination Ombudsman (LDO), who is chosen by the government to serve a six-year term. Although the office is funded by the Norwegian government, it maintains its own autonomy and independence.

=== Protection of refugees ===
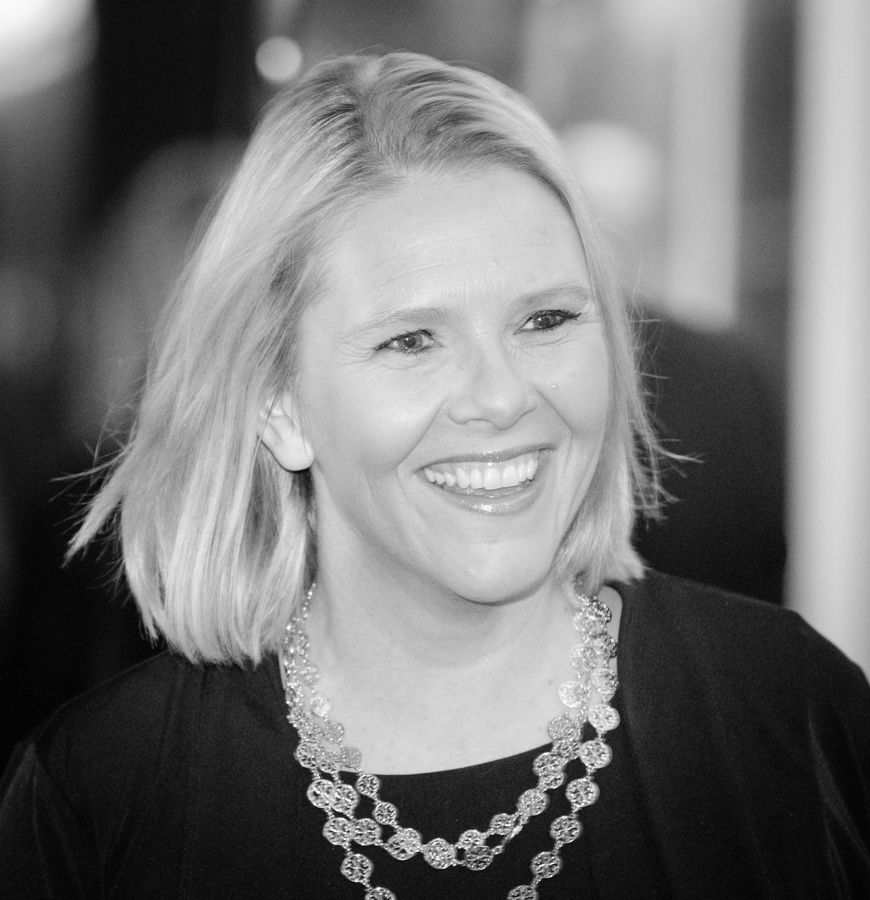
Sylvi Listhaug - the first Norwegian Minister for Immigration

The Norwegian Law facilitates permission of asylum and refuge to peoples displaced from their home countries. Whilst their refugee applications status is under review, asylum seekers are allowed to seek and obtain work, should they meet three main criteria. These criteria are that asylum seekers must have proof of identity; have a document demonstrating that they will most likely receive asylum; and be part of an "integration" program. Norway has agreed to the EU's Dublin III regulation, which authorises the transfer of asylum seekers to other European countries who are responsible for adjudicating the case.

Recently, there has been criticism of the Norwegian government's lack of dedication to accepting refugees. In 2017, Norway accepted 30,000 refugees, whilst neighbouring country Sweden took in 160,000. Sylvi Listhaug, Norway's first immigration minister, cited the low acceptance of refugees as "a big challenge to integrate [...] to make sure they respect Norwegian values".

== Economic, social, and cultural rights ==
=== Women's rights ===
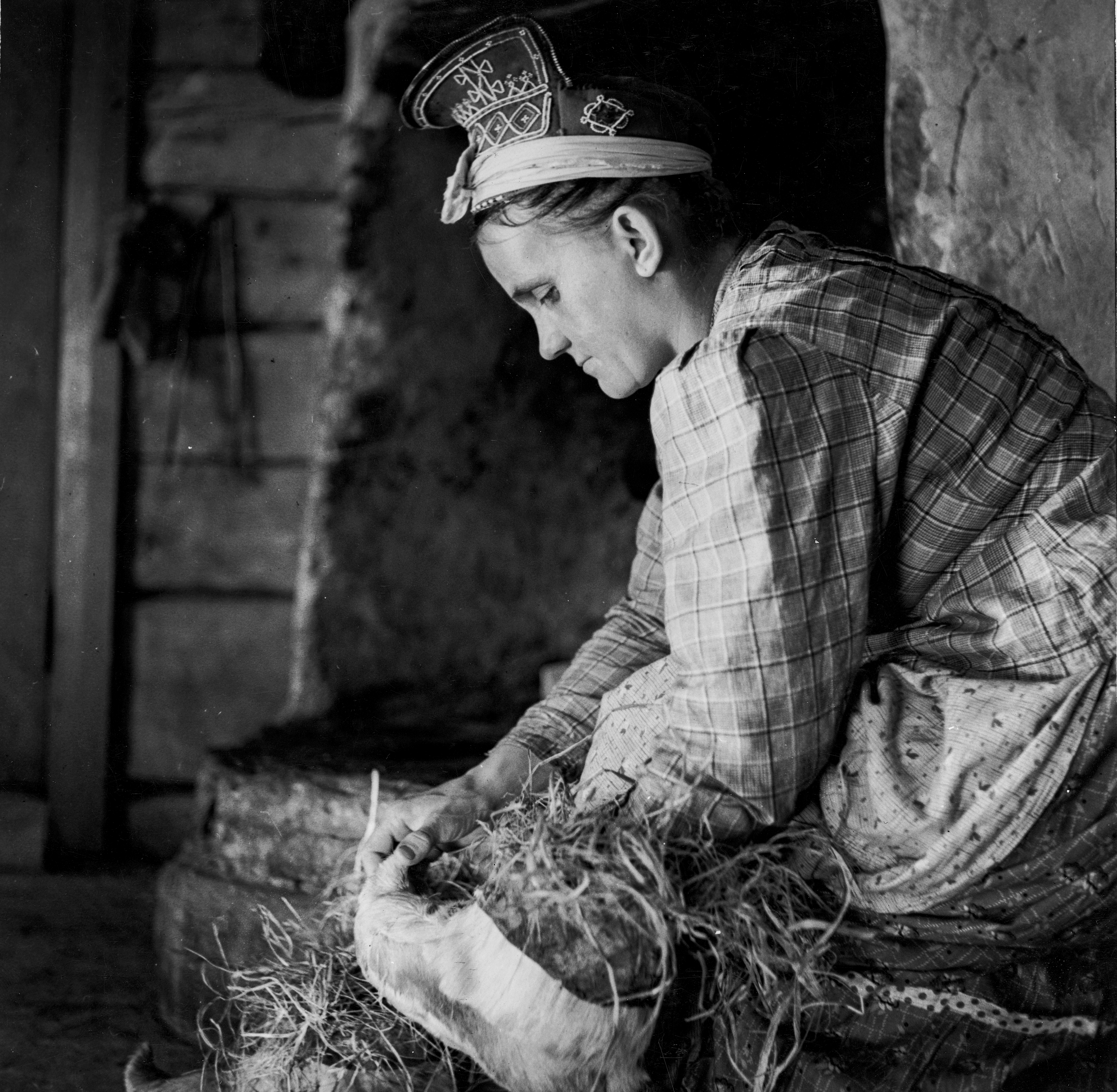
A Sami woman, the Sami people are the Indigenous inhabitants of Norway

The prohibition of discrimination against women is guarded by law. Penalties can extend to up to 21 years' incarceration for crimes such as rape. Issues including domestic violence and sexual harassment continue to remain a problem in Norwegian society. 27% of women experience physical and/or sexual violence from an intimate partner within their lifetime, and 6% in the last 12 months. The conviction rate for domestic violence sits at 10%, causing criticisms by institutions such as the Oslo Crisis Centre that the government is not doing enough to reduce rates of gender-based violence.

The National Coordination Unit of Victims of Human Trafficking (KOM) was initiated to reduce the number of women who fall victim to sex trafficking within Norway, in an effort by the Norwegian government to address the rising number of sex trafficking victims. Despite Norway's welcomed efforts by the UN, the number of victims of sex trafficking in Norway continues to rise, increasing from 203 to 292 victims from 2007 to 2009.

The Norwegian Government launched a plan in 2016 to reduce violence against women, called the Action Plan for Women's Rights and Gender Equality in Foreign and Development Policy 2016–2020. The plan has five main goals which Norway aims to promote to reduce discrimination and violence against women. The five aims are:

1. Inclusive and equitable quality education for all girls and boys
2. Women's equal participation in political life
3. Full economic rights for women and equal opportunities for women to participate in the labor market
4. The elimination of violence and harmful practices against girls and women
5. Sexual and reproductive health and rights for girls and women

In addition, government programs have been implemented to reduce rates of domestic violence in Norway, including the appointment for a dedicated domestic violence coordinator at all police districts. There are also over 47 publicly-funded shelters, and 5, 24-hour hotlines managed by the Norwegian government.

=== Children's rights ===
Children of Norway are protected by the Convention on the Rights of the Child. Issues of child abuse and mistreatment are primarily investigated by the Ombudsman for Children in Norway. Citizenship within Norway is granted through parents; children born in Norway do not automatically become citizens. A recent Amnesty International report raises concern that unaccompanied minors arriving on Norwegian soil are taken into unaccompanied minor centres that have living conditions not on par with human rights standards.

Assault against children in punishable under Norwegian law, yet 2017 ended with over 48,000 instances of documented child abuse. A Norwegian survey registered that between 5 - 10% of children in Norway had experienced some form of physical and/or sexual violence in their lifetime. In 2018, a 26-year-old man was charged with the sexual assaults of over 300 underage boys. Police described the football-referee's crimes as "Norway's biggest ever sexual abuse case".

The European Court of Human Rights ruled that Norway, which disproportionately removes children of immigrant background and argues it gives them a better future, was mistaking poverty for neglect and that there are other ways to help destitute children.

=== Indigenous rights ===
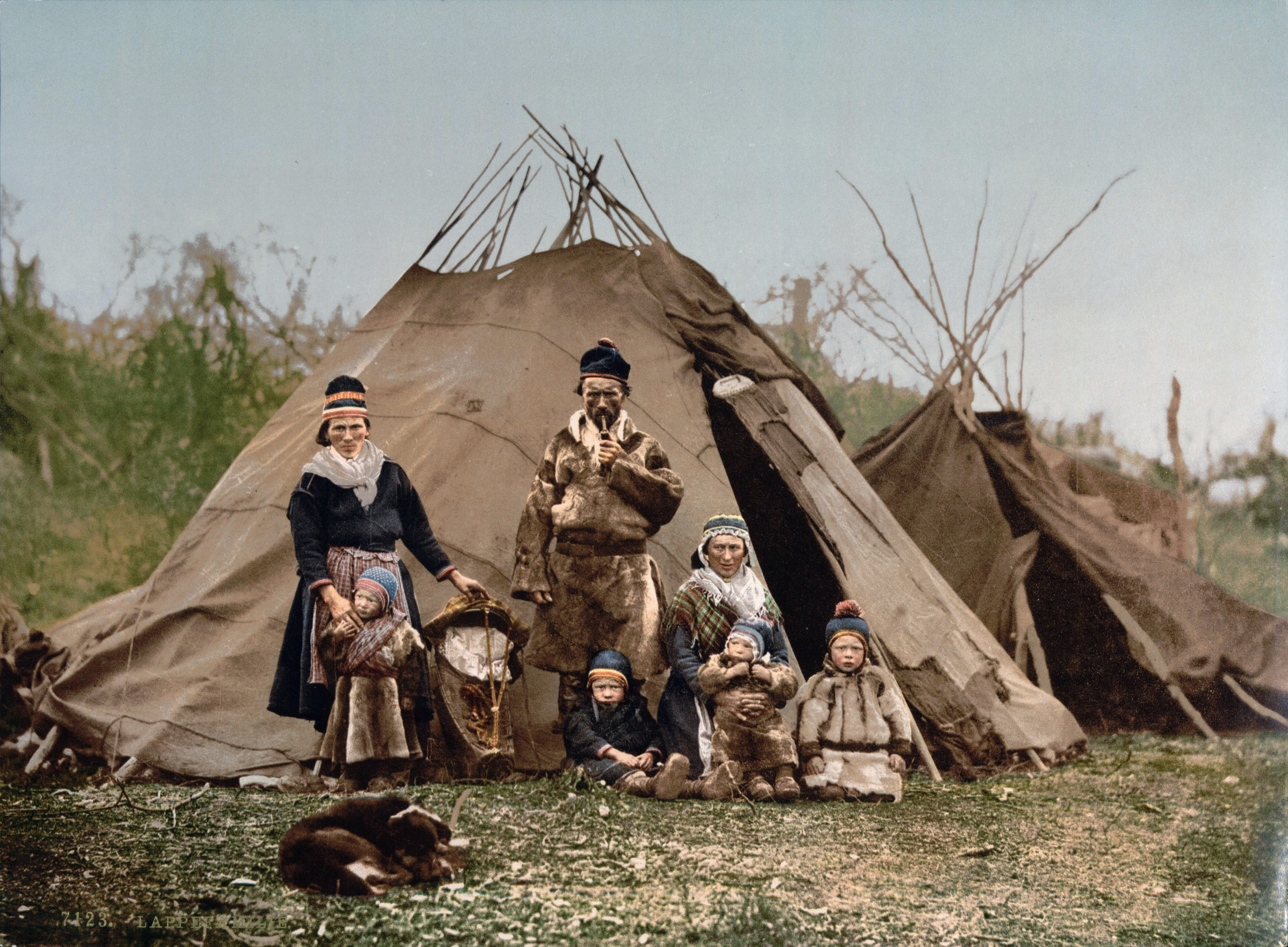
A Sami family

The Sami people are the inhabitants of the northernmost parts of Norway, Finland, Sweden, and the Kola Peninsula of Russia. Despite the bureaucratic boundaries existing between the four states, the Sami people continue to operate as a single group, bonded through their rich cultural and linguistic connections. Despite there being over 50,000 people living and identifying as a Sami person, there is no official state registry defining the Sami people as Indigenous in Norway.

Various pieces of legislation have been enacted to protect the cultural and linguistic heritage of the Sami people. The Norwegian Sami Act (1987) provided a legal and verified definition of a Sami, as someone who 'has Sami as a first language, or whose father or mother or one of whose grandparents has or had Sami as a first language, and who considers themselves a Sami". 1980 saw the creation of the Sami Rights Commission, which was enacted to address the economic and political issues of the Sami people. It was this that led to the creation of the Sameting, also known as the Norwegian Sami Assembly. This body mainly serves to ensure the rights of the Sami people, and sustain Norway's commitment to accomplish their international obligations.

In today's world, the Sami people hold a large amount of autonomy, and have their own parliament to which they elect, called the Samediggi. After years of struggle, their autonomy is also protected by the Norwegian constitution, which states that "the authorities of the state shall create conditions enabling the Sami people to preserve and develop its language, culture and way of life".

=== LGBT+ rights ===
There exists legislation designed to prohibit discrimination based on sexual orientation and gender identity, in the broad scope of housing, employment, citizenship, and access to services provided by the government. Despite this, targeted violence towards transgender individuals is still not considered a hate crime within Norwegian legislation. The Norwegian Association of Gender and Sexual Diversity reported repeated concern about the lack of disclosure of sexual orientation as a reason for hate crimes. The government is attempting to address these concerns through more thorough and consistent training and education for police on LGBT+ discrimination.

=== Disability rights ===
The US Department of State reports that there was effective enforcement of laws which prohibit discrimination against the disabled community within Norway.

=== Anti-semitism ===
There is only a very small Jewish population in Norway, about 1400, half of which belong to Jewish congregations. In an effort to reduce antisemitism, the Norwegian government launched an 'Action Plan against Antisemitism 2016 - 2020', of which the four main points are:

1. Antisemitism holds a separate category of hate crime in police statistics
2. Education about antisemitism is integrated into all schools
3. Increased funding for Jewish museums and cultural institutions
4. Research into antisemitism and Jewish life is also funded

== Human rights abuses ==
=== Current criticism ===
The UN Universal Periodic Review describes statuses of human rights issues in Norway. In 2015, a Council of Europe Commissioner for Human Rights advocated for more policies advancing the empowerment of people with disabilities and full inclusion of Roma. Norway's parliament has refused to sign the UN Declaration on the Rights of Disabled Persons, and there are several reports of the human rights of various groups of disabled people not being fully recognized. Norway has been criticized for not judicially defining rape on the basis of lack of consent.

=== Land rights of the Sami people ===
The increased demand for natural resources in recent times has led to social conflict between the Sami people and the local communities of Norway. The construction of infrastructure such as buildings, roads, mines, and dams, all preside primarily in areas inhabited by the Sami people. This has led to contention between the land rights of the Sami people, and the employment and development opportunities that would arise from these projects for local communities.

The traditional landowner rights granted to the Sami people under the Norwegian legislation allow for their rejection of development proposals should it prohibit their ability to pursue their traditional livelihoods. As well as the Norwegian constitution, this right is guaranteed via various multilateral treaties, including the International Convention on the Elimination of All Forms of Racial Discrimination, the International Covenant on Civil and Political Rights, and the United Nations Declaration of the Rights of Indigenous Peoples. Standards established via institutions such as the International Labour Organisation (ILO) and the Tribal People's Convention explain that in order for development on Indigenous land, such as the creation of infrastructure on Sami territory, must have the 'free, prior, and informed consent' of the party involved.

In response to the land rights crisis in Northern Norway, the Norwegian government published the Finnmark Act of 2005, which provided partial protection of the Sami land in Finnmark Country. The act elucidated that ownership of land and natural resources would be changed from state ownership to local ownership, meaning that Finnmark Estate owned its own land. The Special Rapporteur of the United Nations provided a report praising the Norwegian response to the land rights crisis.
