= NUTS statistical regions of Norway =

Statistical regions of Norway

As a member of EFTA, Norway (NO) is not included in the Classification of Territorial Units for Statistics (NUTS), but in a similar classification used for coding statistical regions of countries that are not part of the EU but are candidate countries, potential candidates or EFTA countries. The three levels are:

- level 1 (equivalent to NUTS level 1): Norway
- level 2 (equivalent to NUTS level 2): 7 Regions
- level 3 (equivalent to NUTS level 3): 19 Counties

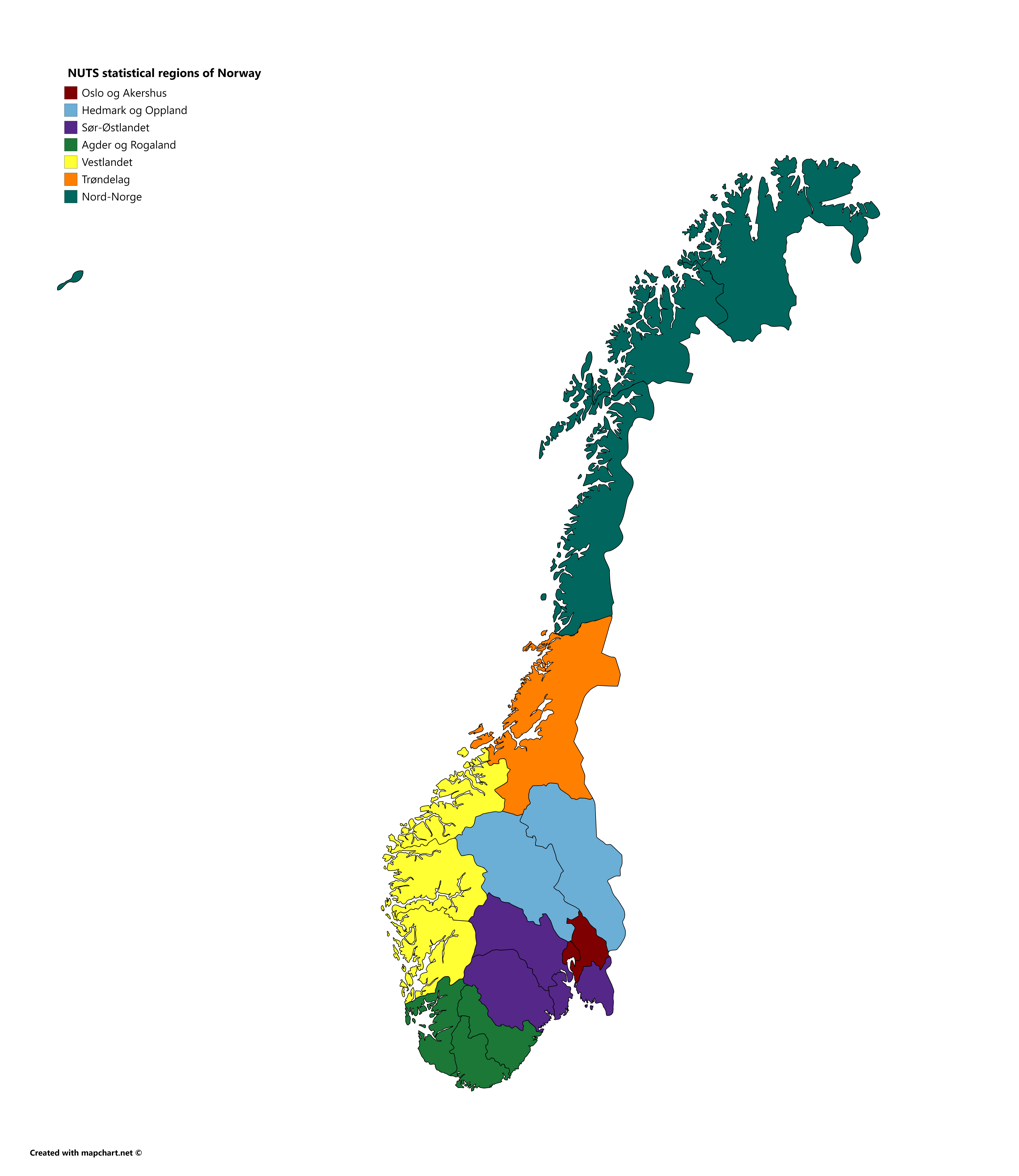

The codes are as follows:

NO0 Norway

NO01 Oslo og Akershus

NO011 Oslo
NO012 Akershus

NO02 Hedmark og Oppland

NO021 Hedmark
NO022 Oppland

NO03 Sør-Østlandet

NO031 Østfold
NO032 Buskerud
NO033 Vestfold
NO034 Telemark

NO04 Agder og Rogaland

NO041 Aust-Agder
NO042 Vest-Agder
NO043 Rogaland

NO05 Vestlandet

NO051 Hordaland
NO052 Sogn og Fjordane
NO053 Møre og Romsdal

NO06 Trøndelag

NO061 Sør-Trøndelag
NO062 Nord-Trøndelag

NO07 Nord-Norge

NO071 Nordland
NO072 Troms
NO073 Finnmark

Below these levels, there are two LAU levels (LAU-1: economic regions; LAU-2: municipalities).

The LAU codes of Norway can be downloaded here:

== See also ==
- Subdivisions of Norway
- ISO 3166-2 codes of Norway
- FIPS region codes of Norway
