= Administrative divisions of Norway =

Norway's elongated shape, its numerous internal geographical barriers and the often widely dispersed and separated settlements are all factors that have strongly influenced the structure of the country's administrative subdivisions. This structure has varied over time and is subject to continuous review. In 2017, the government decided to abolish some of the counties and to merge them with other counties to form larger ones, reducing the number of counties from 19 to 11, which was implemented on 1 January 2020. Following protests, the new government decided to abolish three of the new counties in 2022, and re-establish seven of the old ones. Taking effect on 1 January 2024 there are fifteen counties in Norway.

== Formal subdivisions ==
There are three levels of political administration in Norway:

- The Kingdom, covering all of Metropolitan Norway, including its integral overseas areas of Svalbard and Jan Mayen. Whereas Svalbard is subject to an international treaty with some limits to Norwegian sovereignty, Jan Mayen shares county governor (fylkesmann) with Nordland county.
- The Counties, known in Norwegian as fylker (singular fylke), of which there are 15. These derive in part from divisions that preceded Norway's constitution in 1814 and independence in 1905. The counties also function as constituencies in elections for Parliament.
- The Municipalities, known in Norwegian as kommuner (singular kommune) of which there are 356. In addition the Longyearbyen local authority has some similarities to a municipality.
- External dependencies

As the infrastructure for travel and communication has improved over the years, so the benefits of further consolidation have remained under review. The number of municipalities has decreased from 744 in the early 1960s to today's 442, and more mergers are planned. Similarly, the political responsibilities of the counties have decreased, and there was talk earlier of combining them into 5–9 regions by 2010. Although those specific plans did not come to fruition, a similar scheme is again under consideration in 2018.

Within the government administration, there are a few exceptions to the county subdivisions:

- The Norwegian court system is divided into six appellate districts.
- The state Church of Norway is divided into eleven dioceses.
- The 13 constituencies for elections to the Sámi Parliament of Norway, which is a part of the Norwegian state apparatus, do not follow the county borders – sometimes encompassing several counties. They do, however, follow municipality borders.

=== County ===
==== County municipality ====
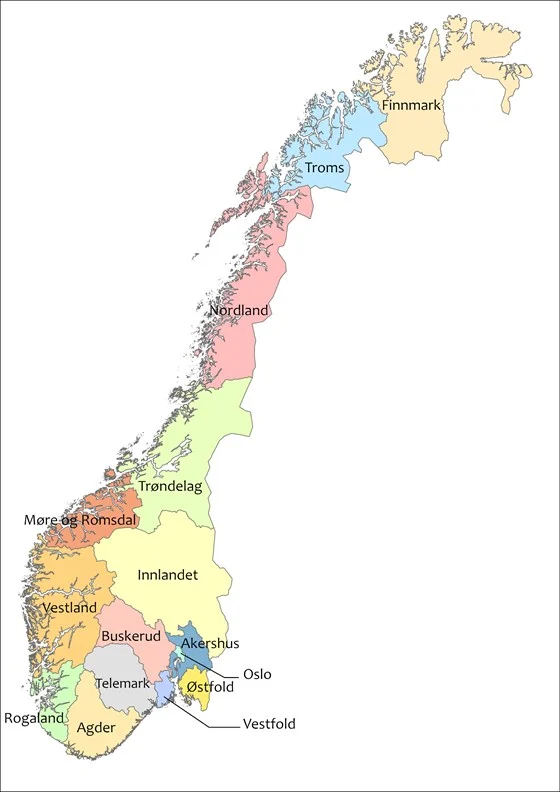
A geopolitical map of Counties in Norway, exhibiting its 15 first-order subnational divisions (fylke/fylker or "counties")

A county municipality (Norwegian: Fylkeskommune) is the public elected body that is responsible for certain public administrative and service tasks within a county. Each county is governed as a county municipality, with the exception of Oslo, which is both a municipality and a county municipality. The main responsibility of the county municipalities are upper secondary schools, dental care, public transport, county roads, culture, cultural heritage management, land use planning and business development.

The main body of each county municipality is the county council (fylkesting), elected by direct election by all legal residents every fourth year. The county councils typically have 30-50 members and meet about six times a year. They are divided into standing committees and an executive board (fylkesutvalg), that meet considerably more often. Both the council and executive board are led by the Chairman of the County Council or County Mayor (fylkesordfører).

The national government, formally the King, is represented in each county by a county governor (Norwegian: Statsforvalter). This office mainly functions as a supervising authority over the county and municipality administrations, and their decisions can be appealed to him.

=== Municipality ===
Municipalities are the atomic unit of local government and are responsible for primary education (through 10th grade), outpatient health services, senior citizen services, some social services, zoning, economic development, and municipal roads. Law enforcement and church services are provided at a national level in Norway. The main body of each municipality is the municipality council (kommunestyre), elected by direct election by all legal residents every fourth year.

==== District ====
For administrative purposes, larger and urban municipalities are divided into districts (Norwegian: bydel) and sometimes sub-districts (Norwegian: delbydel).

In Oslo and Stavanger, these districts elect their own District Councils, which are part of the municipal organization but have a certain amount of influence in issues regarding health, education and naming.

For statistical purposes, Statistics Norway divides municipalities into statistical sub-areas (Norwegian: delområde) and further statistical basic units (Norwegian: grunnkrets). These statistical sub-areas typically coincide with the districts and sub-districts.

=== Integral territories ===
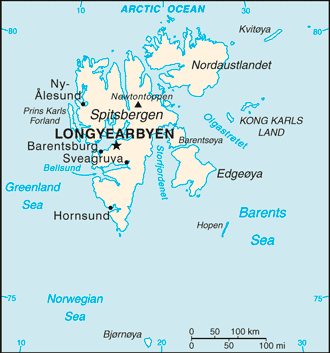
Svalbard

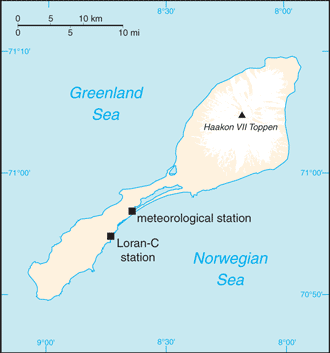
Jan Mayen

Both Svalbard and Jan Mayen are "part of the Kingdom of Norway", although they are not allocated to a particular county and have not been declared as dependencies. Svalbard and Jan Mayen is administered outside of the fylker system.

== Dependencies ==
Norway has three dependent territories (Norwegian: biland), all uninhabited and located in the Southern Hemisphere. Bouvet Island is a Subantarctic island in the South Atlantic Ocean. Queen Maud Land is a sector of Antarctica which spans between 20° west and 45° east. Peter I Island is a volcanic island located 450 kilometres (280 mi) off the coast of Ellsworth Land of continental Antarctica. Both Peter I Island and Queen Maud Land are south of 60°S and are thus part of the Antarctic Treaty System. While the treaty states that the claims are not affected by the treaty, only the other countries with claims recognize Norwegian sovereignty on the island. The dependencies are administration by the Polar Affairs Department of the Ministry of Justice and the Police in Oslo. Norwegian criminal law, private law and procedural law applies to the dependencies, in addition to other laws that explicitly state they are valid on the island.

== Informal subdivisions ==
Municipalities and counties of Norway

=== Regions ===
Norway is generally divided into five regions (Norwegian: landsdel), which largely represent areas with a common language and culture: Northern Norway, Trøndelag, Western Norway, Southern Norway and Eastern Norway. Regions hold no official status in the government, but is used for organizing some public organizations, including the Norwegian Public Roads Administration and the regional health authorities. Central Norway is a region which consists of Trøndelag and Møre og Romsdal. Trøndelag and Northern Norway is collectively known as Nordenfjells. Sápmi is an area which spans into Sweden, Finland and Russia and is defined as the "homeland" of the Sami. The Norwegian Meteorological Institute uses different regions, corresponding to the weather patterns.

List of regions
Region	Counties
Northern Norway	Nordland, Troms, Finnmark
Trøndelag	Trøndelag
Western Norway	Møre og Romsdal, Vestland, Rogaland
Southern Norway	Agder
Eastern Norway	Oslo, Akershus, Buskerud, Østfold, Vestfold, Telemark, Innlandet

=== Districts ===
Districts (Norwegian: distrikt) represent an unofficial area organized by common language, culture or geographical barriers. Their boundaries are subjective and some areas may be regarded as belonging to multiple districts. Districts are larger than municipalities and smaller than counties, although some districts may span across county borders. Some districts form a hierarchy where a district can be subdivided into multiple lesser districts.

=== Settlements and rural areas ===
Statistics Norway uses the term "settlement" for any collection of at least 200 people who live close together. Outside of these there may be rural areas which have an unofficial border. Sometimes these are defined by school districts. Cities are often divided into boroughs, which may or may not have

== History ==
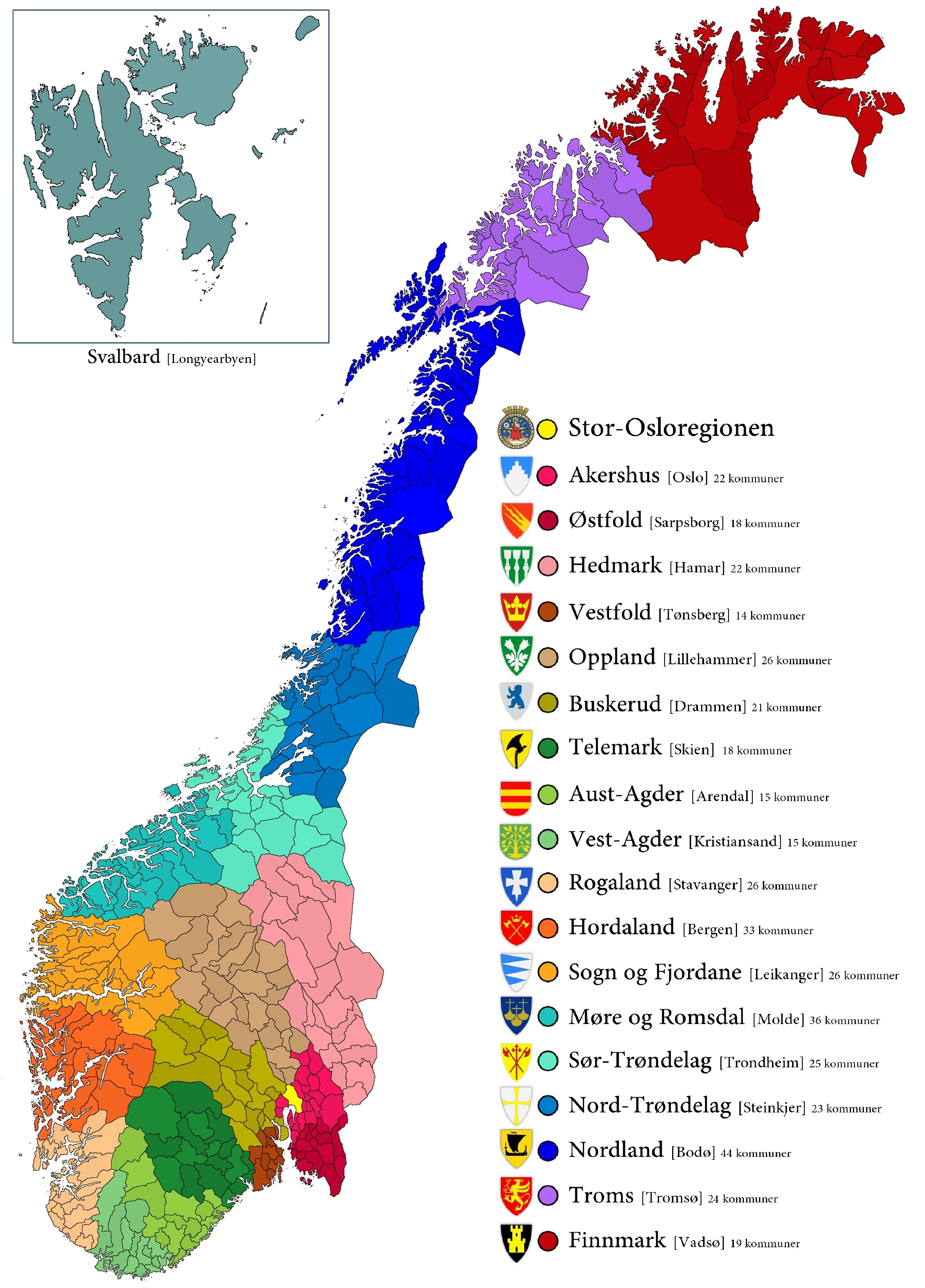
Regions in Norway before 2019

Municipal independence was established in 1838. The introduction of self-government in rural districts was a major political change. The Norwegian farm culture (bondekultur) that emerged came to serve as a symbol of national resistance to the forced union with Sweden. The legislation of 1837 gave both the towns and the rural areas the same institutions: a minor change for the town, but a major advance for the rural communities.

The composition and number of municipalities, their functions, and the existence and functions of the counties are being continuously debated. However, there are currently no plans for reform.

== See also ==
- ISO 3166-2 codes of Norway
- FIPS region codes of Norway (standard withdrawn in 2008)
- NUTS of Norway
- Subdivisions of the Nordic countries
- List of possessions of Norway
