= List of ecoregions in Norway =

The following is a list of ecoregions in Norway.

== Mainland Norway ==
The ecoregions of mainland Norway are as follows:

=== Taiga ===
- Scandinavian and Russian taiga

=== Temperate coniferous forests ===
- Scandinavian coastal conifer forests

=== Temperate broadleaf and mixed forests ===
- Sarmatic mixed forests

=== Tundra ===
- Kola Peninsula tundra
- Scandinavian montane birch forest and grasslands

== Svalbard ==
The ecoregions of Svalbard are as follows:

=== Tundra ===
- Arctic desert
