= Irreligion in Norway =

Norway is a comparatively secular nation which no longer has a state religion, though 68.7% of the 5.4 million population belong to the Church of Norway.

A partial explanation for the high membership is that by law all children who have at least one parent who is a member, automatically become members. This has been controversial, as many become members without knowing, and as this favours the Church of Norway over other churches, religions, lifestance organisations and over the unaffiliated. This law remained unchanged even after the separation of church and state in 2012.

== Irreligion and secularization in politics ==
In 2012, an amendment to the Norwegian Constitution removed the Evangelical-Lutheran religion as Norway's official state religion. A 2017 amendment to the Church Act further expanded this separation of church and state by designating the Church of Norway as an independent legal entity removed from the state. Employees of the Church Council and the Bishop's Offices were no longer designated as state employees but rather employees of the newly independent church. This removed some religious responsibilities from the King, who previously had the power to appoint Bishops.

Mandatory incorporation of religious (particularly Lutheran) teachings in Norwegian public primary schools has come under scrutiny in recent decades in light of increased religious pluralism and secularization in the country. In 1997, public primary schools were required to teach a course titled "Christianity, Religions and Life Stances". While previous iterations of the course had allowed exemptions for students of different faiths, the 1997 iteration did not allow for exemptions of the same nature. In 2004, both the Norwegian Humanist Association and the Norwegian Islamic Council supported a group of parents in submitting a case against the state to the United Nations, which found the course in violation of the Human Rights Codes. The course was revised in 2008, renamed as "Religion, Philosophies of Life and Ethics" in an attempt to further incorporate both Humanist and non-Christian teachings into public education.

Between 1988 and 2008, Norway's parliamentary parties had the highest frequency of including religious issues in their platforms compared to parties in other Nordic countries (Denmark, Iceland, Finland, and Sweden). However, despite having a higher total number of religious issues in politics, Norway also experienced the most significant decrease in total number of religious issues included over the 20-year period.

== Irreligious organizations ==
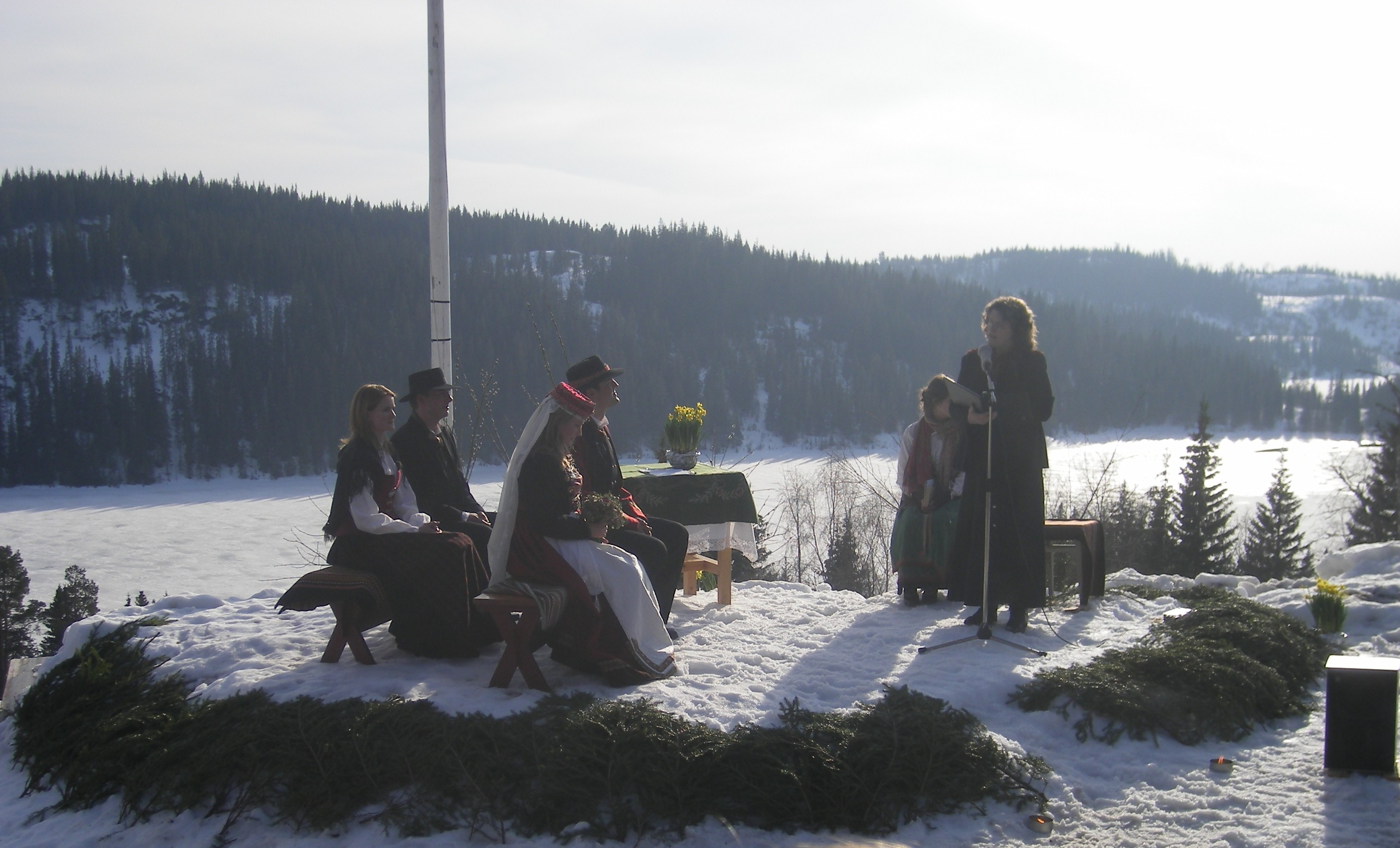
Humanist wedding ceremony in 2007, performed outdoors

There are several irreligious organizations in Norway. By far the biggest, oldest and most visible is the Norwegian Humanist Association (HEF), founded in 1956, which has close to 100,000 members. Those members constitute 1.7% of the national population of 5.36 million, making the HEF by far the largest such association in the world in proportion to population.

The HEF offers civil alternatives for wedding, funeral, and Confirmation ceremonies which may typically be facilitated through religious institutions. Confirmation ceremonies remain popular as coming-of-age rituals for adolescents in Norway. In 2014, nearly 63% of Norwegians aged 15 years experienced Confirmation ceremonies through the Church of Norway. However, between 15 and 20% of confirmation rituals in Norway are now conducted as civil confirmations through the Norwegian Humanist Association. Known as "Humanist Confirmations", these alternative ceremonies mark the completion of coursework in critical thinking, ethics, identity, and human rights through a Humanist lens.

Both the Church of Norway and the Norwegian Humanist Association receive financial support from the Norwegian government. In light of the Church of Norway being supported through taxation, nearly 600 additional faith and life stance organisations such as the HEF have the opportunity to apply for and receive financial support proportional to the Church of Norway based on membership.

An additional irreligious organization is the Norwegian Heathen Society, established in 1974. This organization more directly opposes religious influence in Norway. When the city council of Oslo permitted public broadcasting of Islamic prayer calls in 2000, the Norwegian Heathen Society, in protest, applied for and was permitted the right to broadcast anti-religious sentiments in public spaces as well.

== Statistics ==
Despite the Church of Norway's official membership, only 2% of the Norwegian population regularly attend church. A 2021 study comparing secularization across Norway, Denmark, and Sweden using survey data from 1998, 2008, and 2018 found that affiliation with National Lutheran Churches among the Norwegian population dropped from nearly 89% in 1998 to 69.8% in 2018. This trend towards disaffiliation was most significant in Norway compared to the other two countries. It was also found that religious disaffiliation in Scandinavia at large accelerated at a faster rate between 2008 and 2018 than between 1998 and 2008, but religious disaffiliation in Norway was already significantly active between 1998 and 2008.

A plurality of Norwegians do not believe in a god. A 2016 survey asking 4,000 people "Do you believe in God?" resulted in 39% saying "No", 37% saying "Yes", and 23% saying "I don't know". According to Pew Research Centre in 2018, 20% from Norway answered that they believed in the God of the Bible, 38% believed in another higher power or spiritual force, and 33% did not believe in any gods or higher powers. In the total results for the country, 47% had selected the option of "Do not believe in God".
