= Wildlife of Norway =

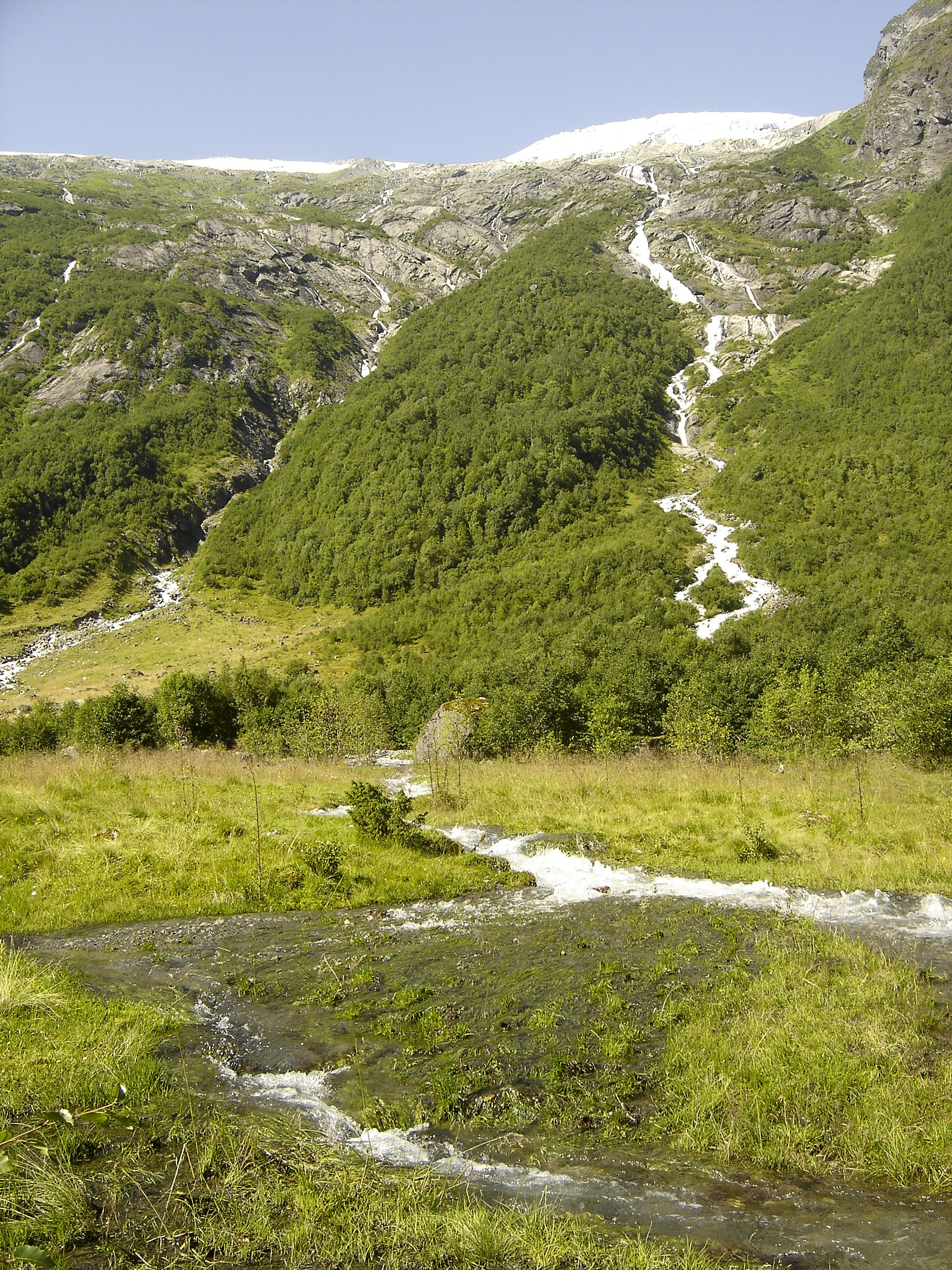
Valley near the Jostedal Glacier

The wildlife of Norway includes the diverse flora and fauna of Norway. The habitats include high mountains, tundras, rivers, lakes, wetlands, sea coast and some lower cultivated land in the south. Mainland Norway has a long coastline, protected by skerries and much dissected by fjords, and the mostly-icebound archipelago of Svalbard lies further north. The flora is very varied and a large range of mammals, birds (many migratory), fish and invertebrate species live here, as well as a few species of reptiles and amphibians.

== Geography ==
Mainland Norway is a mountainous, elongated country with a very long coastline. It extends from a latitude of 58°N to more than 71°N, which is north of the Arctic Circle, and there are some 50,000 smaller islands off the extremely indented coastline. The Scandinavian Mountains extend along the length of the country; the average elevation is 460 m (1,510 ft) and 32% of the mainland is located above the tree line. The mountains end abruptly on the west coast and there is little in the way of a coastal plain. Between the mountains are deep valleys, with lowland largely limited to the southeastern region of the country and the south coast. The far northeast of the country is less mountainous, with rolling hills and the Finnmarksvidda plateau.

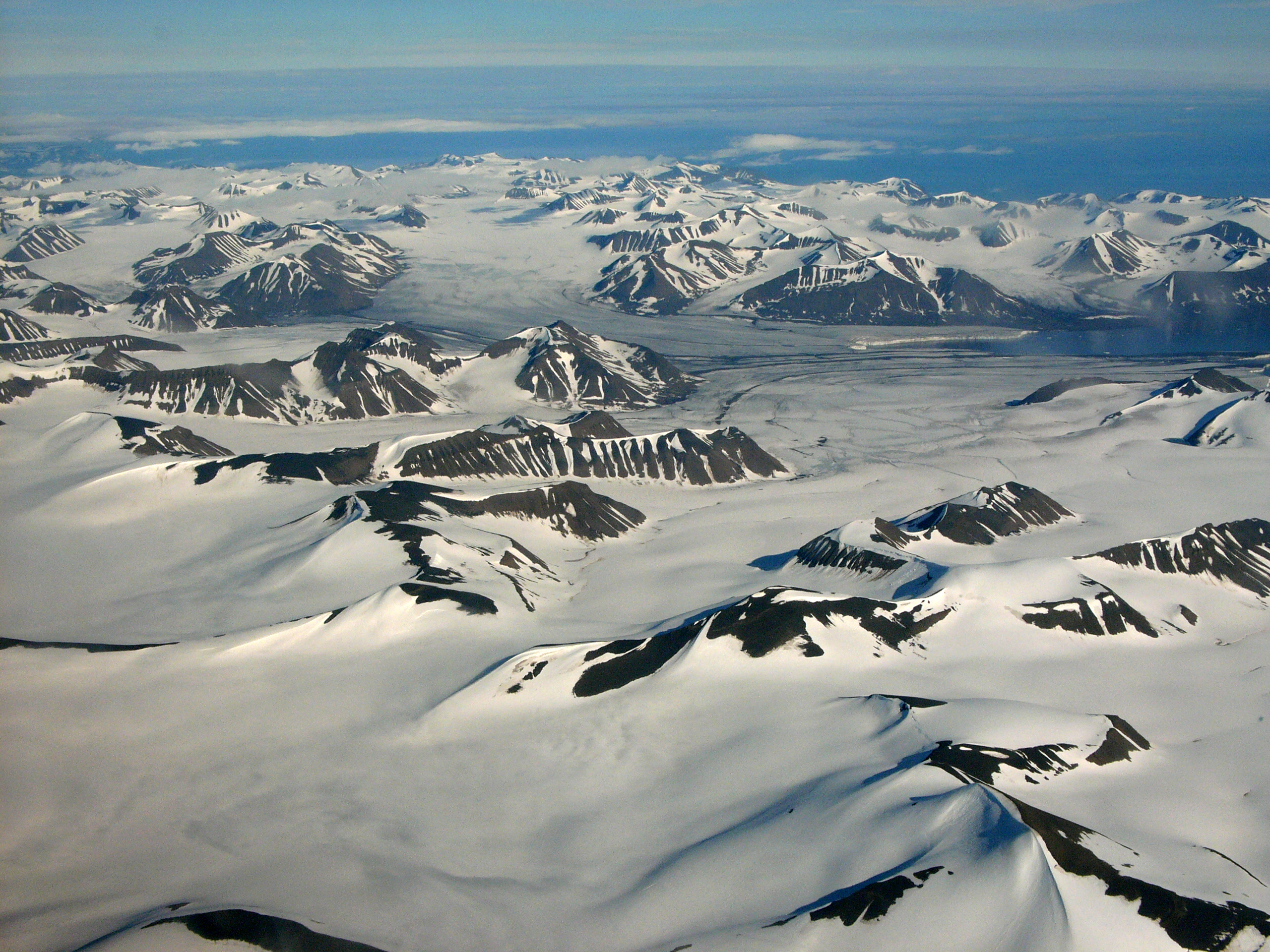
Ice-covered Svalbard during August

Further north still, the archipelago of Svalbard has an arctic climate; the land surface on the three large and many smaller islands is 60% glacier ice, 30% rock and scree, and only 10% is vegetated. The island has its own distinctive flora and fauna.

== Climate ==
The climate of much of the mainland is subarctic, with some continental climate in the southeast and some oceanic climate around the coast. Compared to other places at similar latitudes, the temperature is higher because of the warm North Atlantic Current, and the coast normally remains free of ice. The predominant winds bring relatively warm, humid air in from the Atlantic. Much precipitation falls on the western side of the mountains, with the long inland valleys being rather drier and land to the east of the mountains experiencing a rain shadow effect, with less precipitation, more sunshine and usually warmer summers. The far north and northeast of the country are drier but experience much fog and drizzle.

The climate of Svalbard is dominated by its high latitude, with the average summer temperature at 5 °C (41 °F) and January averages at −14 °C (7 °F). The West Spitsbergen Current moderates Svalbard's temperatures, particularly during winter.

== Flora ==
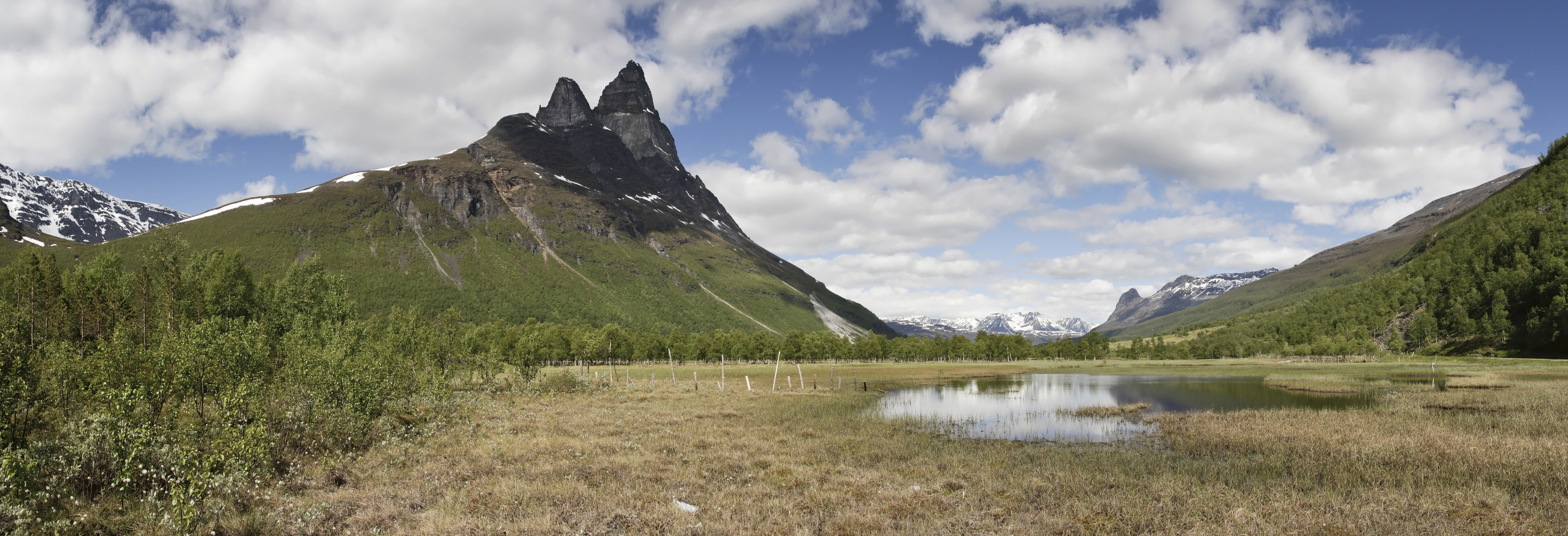
Bogs and lakes are common in the boreal zone

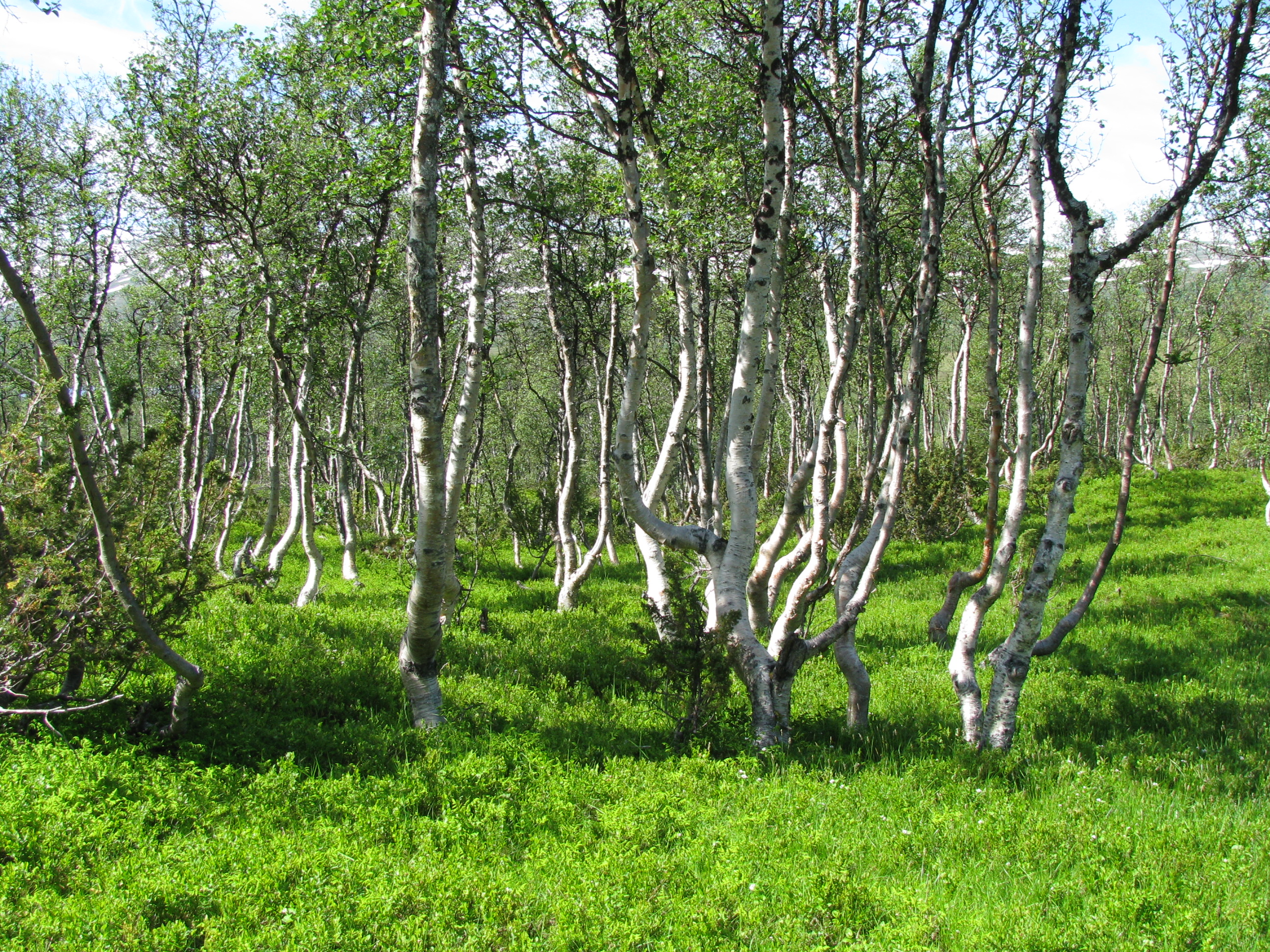
Arctic downy birch forms the treeline in most of Scandinavia

Vegetation zones in Norway include forests, bogs, wetlands and heaths. Boreal species are adapted to the long, cold winters but need a growing season of sufficient length and warmth. Thus typical boreal species include the Norway spruce and pine, while at higher altitudes deciduous trees like downy birch, grey alder, aspen and rowan predominate. Higher still, these give way to dwarf willows and birches above which are tundra, rock and ice. The tundra is too exposed and the climate too severe to support trees and large plants, and here grow mountain grasses and low-growing alpine plants such as mountain avens and purple saxifrage. At even higher altitudes mosses and lichens provide the chief vegetation cover.

Estimates of the total number of species in the country include 20,000 species of algae, 1,800 species of lichen, 1,050 species of mosses, 2,800 species of vascular plants, and up to 7,000 species of fungi.

In parts of the country with a more continental climate, spruce and pine are dominant and grow at higher elevations than other trees, but in other areas, mountain birch forms the tree line, at around 1,200 m (4,000 ft) in central southeastern Norway, descending to 750 m (2,500 ft) at the Arctic Circle and to sea level further north. At higher altitudes, the terrain is arctic tundra.

Svalbard has permafrost and tundra, with both low, middle and high Arctic vegetation. 165 species of plants have been found on the archipelago. Only those areas which defrost in the summer have vegetation cover and this accounts for about 10% of the island group.

== Fauna ==
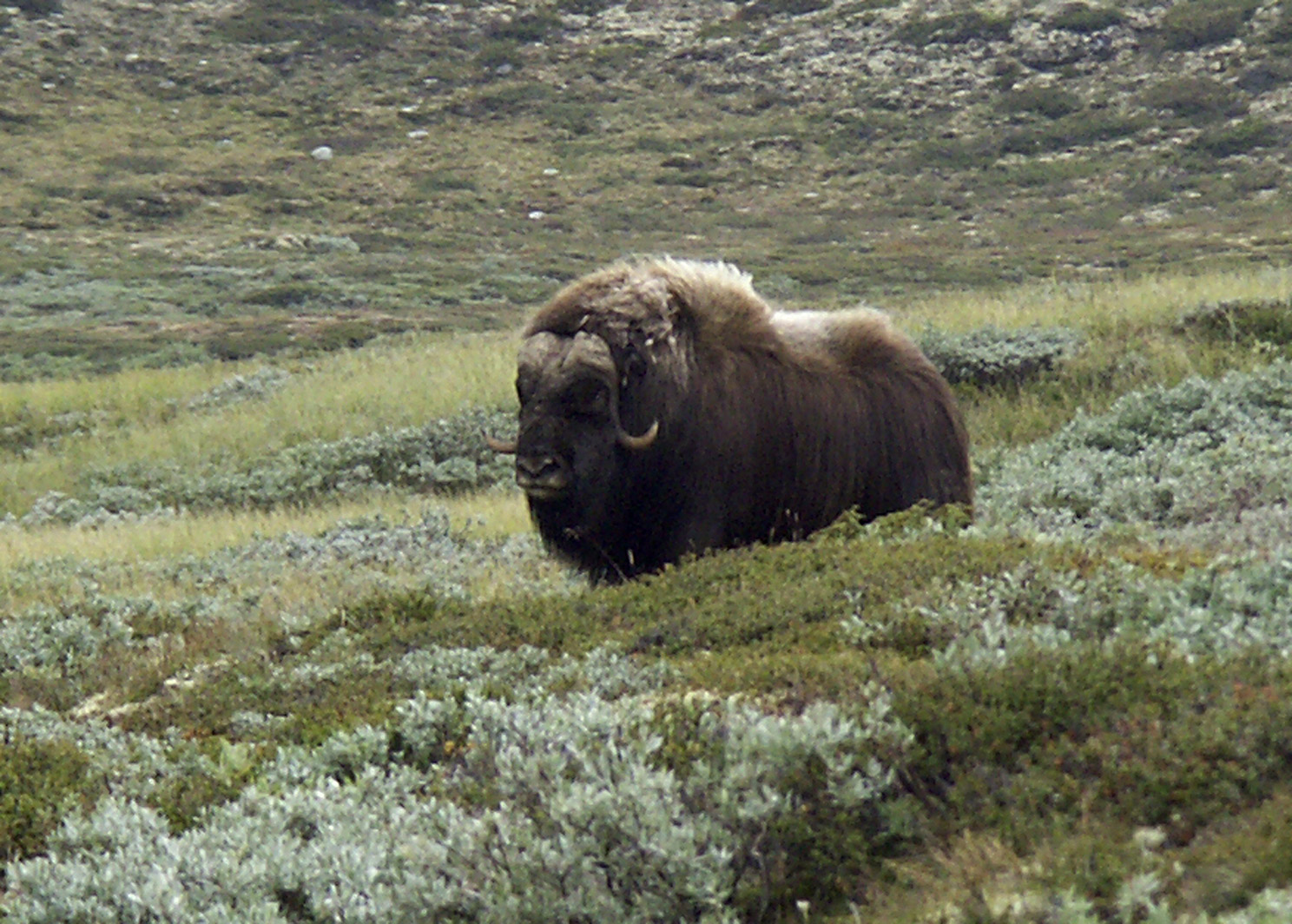
Muskox in the low alpine tundra at Dovrefjell National Park

Excluding bacteria and viruses but including marine organisms, the total number of animal and plant species in Norway is estimated at 60,000. This includes 16,000 species of insects (probably 4,000 more species yet to be described), 450 species of birds (250 species nesting in Norway), 90 species of mammals, 45 fresh-water species of fish, 150 marine species of fish, 1,000 species of fresh-water invertebrates, and 3,500 species of marine invertebrates.

Terrestrial mammals on mainland Norway include the European hedgehog, six species of shrews and ten of bats. The European rabbit, the European hare and the mountain hare all live here as do the Eurasian beaver, the red squirrel and the brown rat as well as about fifteen species of smaller rodent. Of the ungulates, the wild boar, the muskox, the fallow deer, the red deer, the elk, the roe deer and the reindeer are found in the country.

Terrestrial carnivores include the Eurasian brown bear, the Eurasian wolf, the red fox and the Arctic fox, as well as the northern lynx, the European badger, the Eurasian otter, the stoat, the least weasel, the European polecat, the European pine marten and the wolverine. The coast is visited by the walrus and six species of seal, and around thirty species of whale, dolphin and porpoise are found in Norwegian waters.

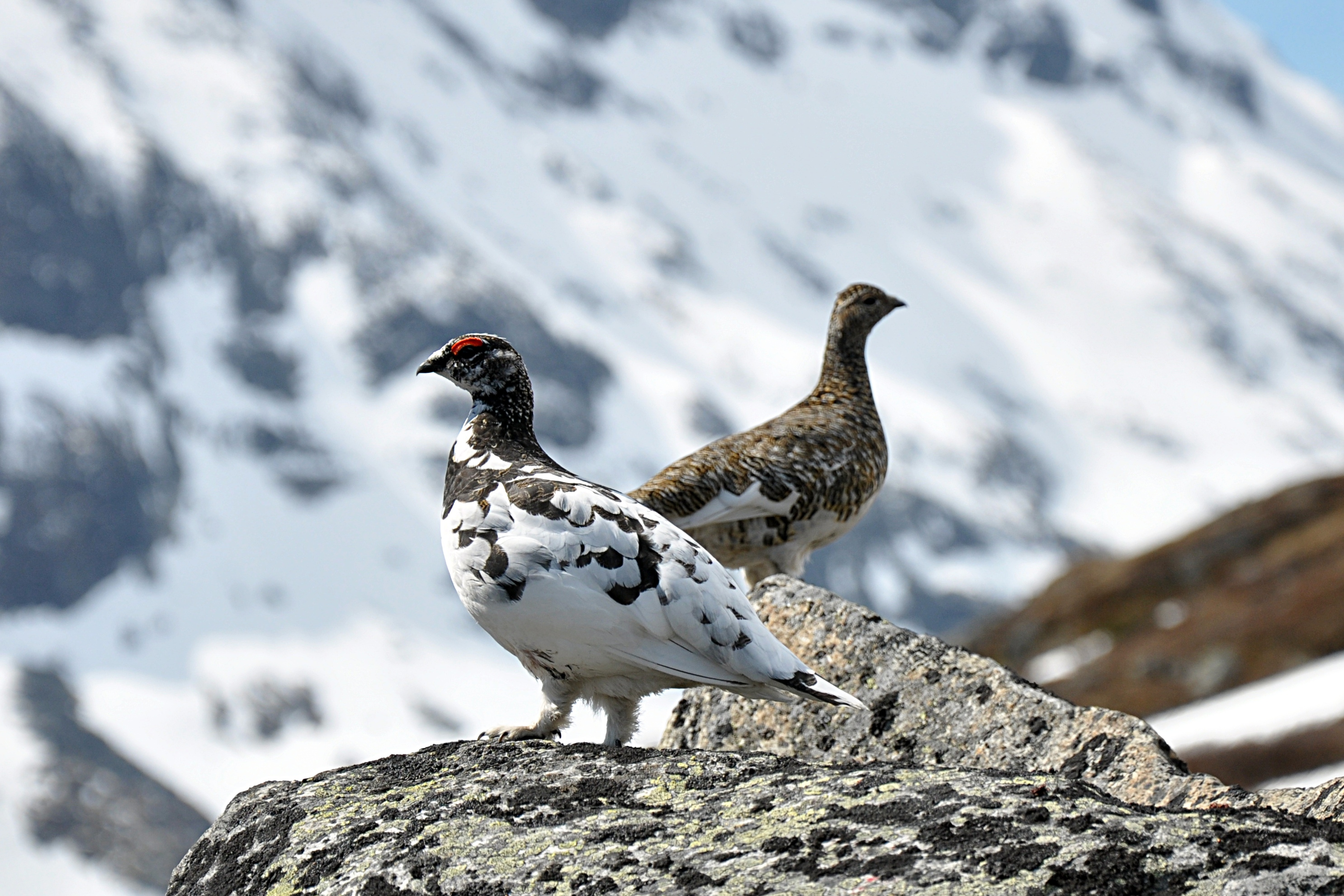
Rock ptarmigan, partly in winter plumage

Norway has a great variety of bird species utilising its many habitats, cliffs, wetlands, forests and tundra. In the summer, insects and other food sources are plentiful and the days are long, giving plenty of time for birds to forage and feed their young. This is not the case in winter when the ground is covered in snow, the wetlands in ice and the days are short, so many of the birds are migratory, usually breeding in Norway and overwintering in southern Europe or Africa.

Six terrestrial species of reptiles have been recorded in Norway: the viviparous lizard, the sand lizard, the slow worm, the European adder, the grass snake and the smooth snake, and leatherback and loggerhead sea turtles occasionally visit the coast. Amphibians are limited to the smooth newt, the great crested newt, the common toad, the common frog, the moor frog and the pool frog.

There are four terrestrial mammalian species on Svalbard, the Arctic fox, the Svalbard reindeer, the polar bear and the accidentally introduced southern vole, which is found only around Grumant. There are around eighteen species of marine mammal including whales, dolphins, seals and walruses. The rock ptarmigan is the only resident species of bird but the snow bunting and wheatear also nest on Svalbard as do the nearly thirty species of seabird that migrate here each year. Most freshwater lakes in the Svalbard archipelago are inhabited by Arctic char.
