= Nordenfjells =

Region of Northern Norway

Coordinates: 63°25′41″N 10°23′49″E

Nordenfjells or Nordafjells (lit. 'North of the Mountains') is currently a name for the area of Norway north of mountain range of Dovrefjell. The term is largely used when referring collectively to Central Norway and Northern Norway. Until around 1800 the name also included all of Western Norway.

The largest city is Trondheim, with the Trondheim Region having a population of 260,000.

Historically, an administrative division of Norway in Sønnenfjells and Nordenfjells has been used from the Middle Ages until around 1800. The border between the two regions was a range from Åna-Sira or Lindesnes, northwards along Langfjella and Dovrefjell. What is today known as Western Norway (Vestlandet) was defined as part of Nordenfjells. The notion of Western Norway was introduced in the 1800s. Erik Pontoppidan was one of the first to use the notion of vestenfields (west of the mountains) as distinct part of Nordenfjells. Pontoppidan observed the notable differences in climate between east and west. Later William Thrane wrote that western Norway included most of Christiansand dicose (Agder, Rogaland and western Telemark). Hans Strøm used the old distinction where «nordenfjells» included western Norway. Christopher Hansteen travelled across Hardangervidda in 1821 and observed that his compassed apparently had a 90° deviation: People in Eastern Norway said they traveled "north" to Hardanger and people from the west were known as "nordmenn". Christian Magnus Falsen in 1822 used Vestlandet about Agder and Jæren. Ivar Aasen's dictionary from 1850 og 1873 use vestlending og Vestlandet as these names are used today.

Norge (Norway) and nordmenn in the Middle Ages were names for the coastal areas from Agder to Hålogaland, and the people there. Ohthere of Hålogaland used these names in his report to King Alfred in year 890. When the kingdom expanded the old labels nordmenn and nordenfjells were still used about the coastal/fjord areas in the west while the eastern areas, Østlandet, were inhabited by austmenn (eastern men).
