= ISO 3166-2:NO =

Entry for Norway in ISO 3166-2

ISO 3166-2:NO is the entry for Norway in ISO 3166-2, part of the ISO 3166 standard published by the International Organization for Standardization (ISO), which defines codes for the names of the principal subdivisions (e.g., provinces or states) of all countries coded in ISO 3166-1.

Currently, for Norway, ISO 3166-2 codes are defined for the following subdivisions:

- 11 counties
- two arctic regions (i.e., Svalbard and Jan Mayen, territories in the Arctic region separated from metropolitan Norway)

Each code consists of two parts separated by a hyphen. The first part is NO, the ISO 3166-1 alpha-2 code of Norway. The second part is two digits.

Collectively Svalbard and Jan Mayen is also assigned its own country code in ISO 3166-1, with alpha-2 code SJ.

Currently the standard matches the county codes assigned by the Norwegian government from 2020 to 2024. The government split the counties of Troms and Finnmark, Viken and Vestfold and Telemark effective by January 2024, which as of January 2026 are not reflected in ISO 3166-2.

== Current codes ==
Subdivision names are listed as in the ISO 3166-2 standard published by the ISO 3166 Maintenance Agency (ISO 3166/MA).

Click on the button in the header to sort each column. Note that subdivision names will be sorted in Norwegian alphabetical order: a-z, æ, ø, å.

A map of mainland Norway with its 11 first-order subnational divisions

Code	Subdivision name (nb, nn)	Subdivision name (en) (Note: For reference only, English name not included in the ISO 3166-2 standard.)	Subdivision category
NO-42	Agder	Agder	county
NO-34	Innlandet	Inland	county
NO-22	Jan Mayen	Jan Mayen	arctic region
NO-15	Møre og Romsdal	More and Romsdal	county
NO-18	Nordland	Northland	county
NO-03	Oslo	Oslo	county
NO-11	Rogaland	Rogaland	county
NO-21	Svalbard	Svalbard	arctic region
NO-54	Troms og Finnmark; Romsa ja Finnmárku (se); Tromssan ja Finmarkun (fkv)	Troms and Finnmark	county
NO-50	Trøndelag; Trööndelage (sma)	Trondelag	county
NO-38	Vestfold og Telemark	Vestfold and Telemark	county
NO-46	Vestland	Westland	county
NO-30	Viken	Viken	county

Notes

The dependent territory of Bouvet Island has its own ISO 3166-1 code and is not included in Norway's entry in ISO 3166-2. There are no ISO 3166-2 codes for Peter I Island and Queen Maud Land, which are part of Antarctica with country code AQ.

== Changes ==
The following changes to the entry have been announced by the ISO 3166/MA since the first publication of ISO 3166-2 in 1998. ISO stopped issuing newsletters in 2013.

Publication	Date issued	Changes made
Newsletter II-3	2011-12-13 (corrected 2011-12-15)	Alphabetical re-ordering
Online Browsing; Platform (OBP)	2018-11-26	Subdivisions deleted: NO-16 Sør-Trøndelag; NO-17 Nord-Trøndelag; Subdivisions added: NO-23 Trøndelag
Online Browsing; Platform (OBP)	2019-04-09	Code change: Trøndelag: NO-23 → NO-50
Online Browsing; Platform (OBP)	2020-11-24	Subdivisions deleted: NO-01 Østfold; NO-02 Akershus; NO-04 Hedmark; NO-05 Oppland; NO-06 Buskerud; NO-07 Vestfold; NO-08 Telemark; NO-09 Aust-Agder; NO-10 Vest-Agder; NO-12 Hordaland; NO-14 Sogn og Fjordane; NO-19 Troms; NO-20 Finnmark; Subdivisions added: NO-30 Viken; NO-34 Innlandet; NO-38 Vestfold og Telemark; NO-42 Agder; NO-46 Vestland; NO-54 Troms og Finnmark

== See also ==
- Subdivisions of Norway
- FIPS region codes of Norway
- NUTS codes of Norway
- Neighbouring countries: FI, RU, SE
