= Domestic violence in Norway =

Domestic violence in Norway is officially referred to as vold i nære relasjoner (English: violence in close relationships). It is defined as:

Violence or threats of violence against persons who are or have been married or who live or have lived in marriage-like relationships. It also applies to siblings, children, parents, grandparents and others in a straight ascending or descending line, as well as adoptive-, foster- and step-relationships. The exercise of violence is independent of location.

== Extent ==
According to Norwegian police statistics, 5,284 cases of domestic violence were reported in 2008. These cases ranged from serious acts of violence such as murder and attempted murder to physical assault. The number of reported cases of domestic violence increased by 500 percent from 2005 to 2011. It is argued that the majority of cases go unrecorded. A 2011 study claimed that one in four women will experience domestic violence in their lifetime.

== Government measures ==
In 2004 the Government established the Norwegian Centre for Violence and Traumatic Stress Studies, a research centre affiliated with the University of Oslo and with the national responsibility for violence research in Norway, including domestic violence.

Domestic violence was also addressed through the 2007 Handlingsplan mot vold i nære relasjoner (English: Action plan to combat domestic violence). This plan was drafted as a collaboration between the Ministry of Children and Family Affairs, the Ministry of Health, the Ministry of Justice and the Ministry of Social Affairs. The stated goal of the plan was expressed as follows:

This action plan has a perspective on help and protection that takes victims of violence and threats and their experiences seriously. The measures are supposed to support their own efforts to escape their situation, and to make it possible to protect their own and their children's lives. Furthermore, the perpetrator must take responsibility for breaking a pattern of violent behavior. Society should, through decisive action and through offers of help and treatment, facilitate such a development.

== See also ==
- Crime in Norway
