= Stein Reinertsen =

Norwegian Lutheran clergyman (born 1960)

The Right Reverend Stein Reinertsen
- Bishop of Agder og Telemark
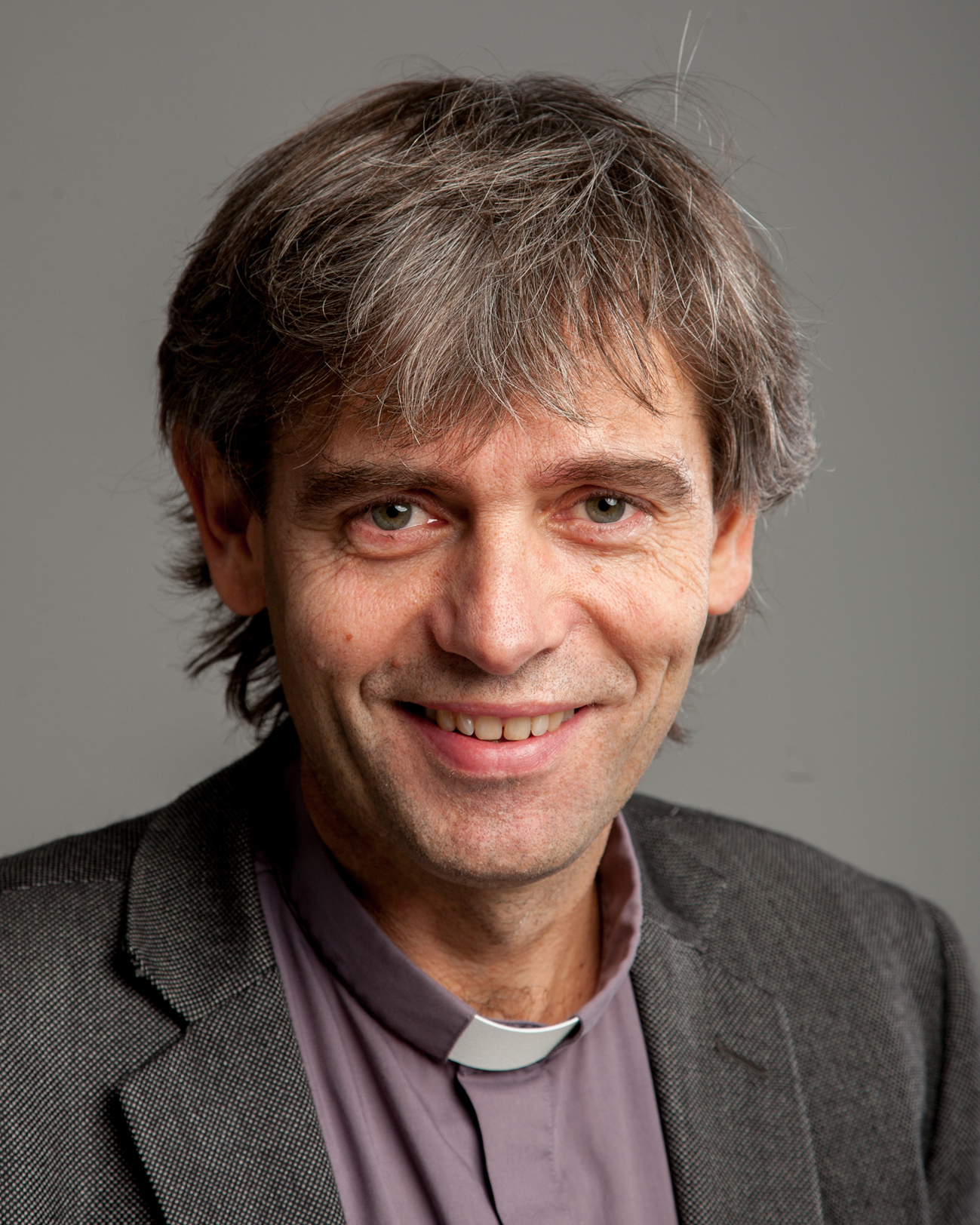
- Church: Church of Norway
- Diocese: Diocese of Agder og Telemark
- Appointed: 2012
- In office: 2013–present
- Predecessor: Olav Skjevesland

Orders
- Ordination: 1987 by Andreas Aarflot
- Consecration: 27 January 2013 by Helga Haugland Byfuglien

Personal details
- Born: 21 January 1960 (age 66)
- Denomination: Lutheran
- Education: Cand.theol. (1986)
- Alma mater: MF Norwegian School of Theology

Stein Reinertsen (born 21 January 1960) is a Norwegian Lutheran clergyman who since January 2013 has been bishop in the Diocese of Agder og Telemark of the Church of Norway.

== Early life and education ==
Stein Reinertsen was born and grew up in Oslo, with parents originally from Lista in Southern Norway. His father died when he was 14.

Reinertsen obtained a cand.theol. degree from the MF Norwegian School of Theology in Oslo in 1986. After finishing practical theological studies, he was consecrated as a pastor of the Church of Norway in the Oslo Cathedral in 1987.

== Career ==
In 1988, Reinertsen worked as a military chaplain in Hans Majestet Kongens Garde (the Royal guards). From 1989 to February 1992, he worked for the Norwegian Christian Student and School Association. Then he worked as a student pastor at the Norwegian University of Life Sciences from 1992 to 1995. In 1995, he was head of Credo Forlag, a publishing house owned by the Norwegian Christian Student and School Association.

He served as parish priest in Farsund Municipality from 1996 to 2012; between 2010 and 2012 he also worked as a hospital pastor at the Sørlandet Hospital Flekkefjord.

In March 2012, he became dean of the Mandal prosti (deanery).

Stein Reinertsen was one of five nominated candidates to become bishop after Olav Skjevesland announced his retirement in 2012. After a round of input from various church bodies, Reinertsen remained as a candidate together with Anne-May Grasaas and Ludvig Bjerkreim. In the second round, he obtained the most votes among local parishes and priests. Eight bishops preferred Anne-May Grasaas, while four preferred Reinertsen. The Church's National Council, having the final say, voted ten for Reinertsen and five for Grasaas.

His appointment was announced in December 2012. It was the first time after the reformation that a bishop in the Church of Norway was appointed by a body of the church and not by the Norwegian government. This was a result of changes to the Constitution of Norway in 2012.

He was consecrated bishop in Kristiansand Cathedral on 27 January 2013. King Harald attended the ceremony, which was the first time he attended a bispevigsling without being head of the Church. Minister of Church affairs Rigmor Aasrud also attended the event which was led by bishop Helga Haugland Byfuglien who was the Preses.

== Theological profile ==
Stein Reinertsen is considered a conservative theologian, but refuses the label of theological conservative.

Early in his career, he was opposed to ordination of women to priesthood, but he changed his view as a result of further studies of bible texts and conversations with former bishop Odd Bondevik. After he was elected bishop, Aftenposten featured a story about Reinertsen being opposed to marrying people who are divorced. This stance was criticised by politicians and others, with the leader of the Vest-Agder Labour Party Linda Verdal leaving the church in protest. In subsequent interviews, Reinertsen underlined that subordinate priests in the diocese were free to follow their own conscience on the issue and he would not discourage them from marrying divorced persons.

In 2013, Reinertsen was among a minority of four bishops who opposed a proposal to allow gay marriages in the Church of Norway, as well as opposing a compromise of allowing church blessing of gay couples who have married secularly. The church's national council has the final say on the issue.

He has been engaged in multicultural work to include immigrants in the Church of Norway, and took courses in the topic in 2008 and 2009.

== Personal life ==
Reinertsen is married and has three grown children. As bishop, he lives in an apartment in the centre of Kristiansand which is owned by the Church of Norway.

Religious titles
Preceded by Olav Skjevesland	Bishop of Agder og Telemark; Since 2012	Incumbent
