= St. Olav's shrine =

Roman Catholic shrine

Coordinates: 63°25′37″N 10°23′49″E

St. Olav's Shrine was the resting place of the earthly remains of St. Olav, Norway's patron saint, behind the high altar of Nidaros Cathedral in Trondheim, Norway, from the mid 11th century. For nearly five centuries the shrine was of major religious importance to Norway and the other Nordic countries, and also to other parts of Northern Europe. St. Olav's Shrine opens and closes the Middle Ages as a historic period in Norway. The shrine consisted of three shrines, the one covering the other, and was the most important and by far the most valuable object in Norway in the Middle Ages. After the Lutheran reformation in 1536–1537, the valuable parts of St. Olav’s Shrine were destroyed by Danish authorities. Since 1568 St. Olav's remains have been resting in an unknown grave, in Nidaros Cathedral or in the cathedral cemetery.

== Background ==
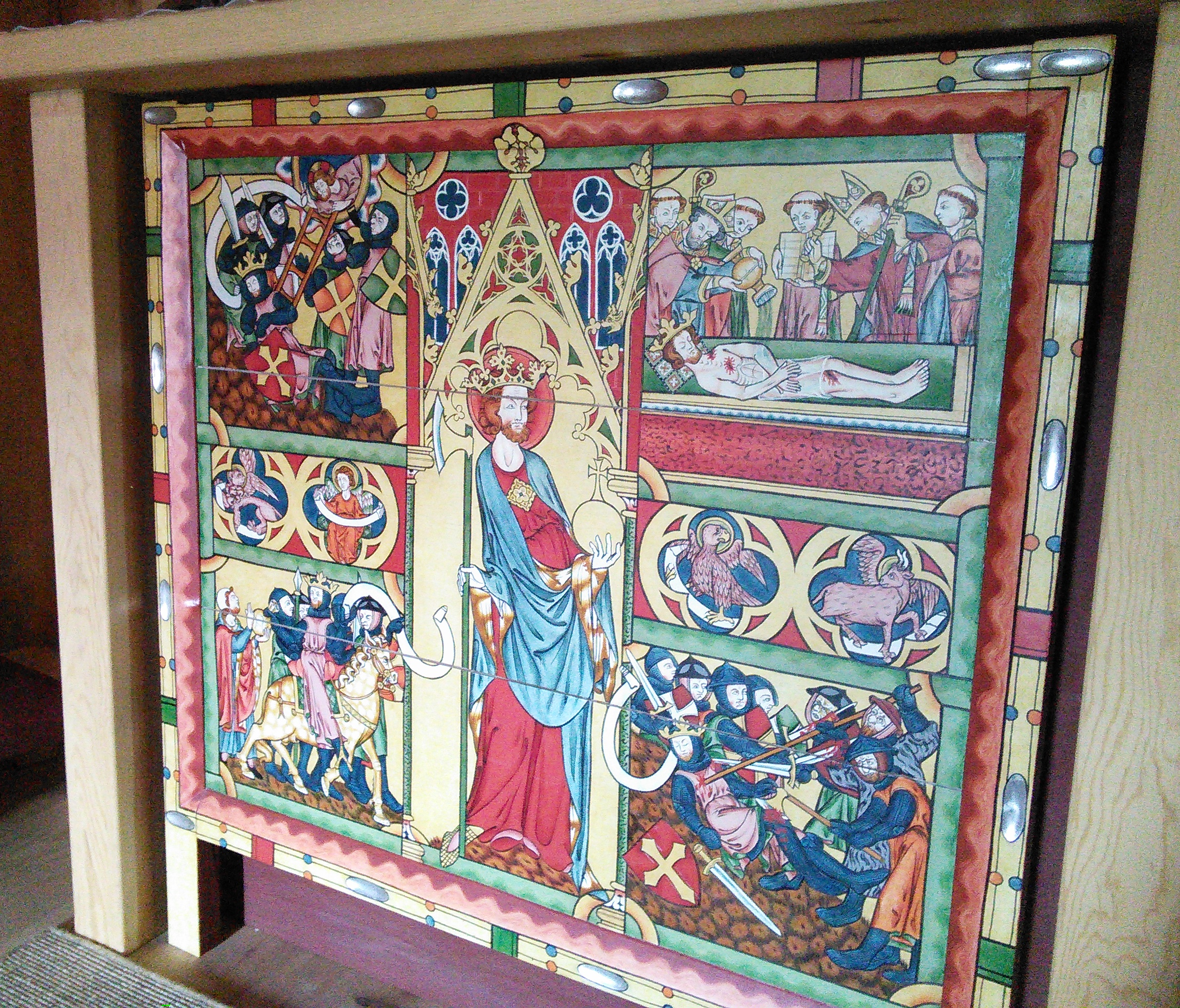
A replica of the c. 1320 Olav altar frontal, showing the opening of Olav's tomb top right.

The night after King Olav II Haraldsson fell in the Battle of Stiklestad east of Trondheim on 29 July 1030, the body was laid in a simple wooden coffin, taken by boat to Trondheim and buried in the sandy bank further up the Nidelven river. According to the saga, those who did this were the farmer at Stiklestad, Torgils Hålmuson, and his son Grim. The following year the coffin was taken up and given a new grave outside St. Clement's Church. Shortly after, on 3 August 1031, the coffin was again taken up and moved into the church, after the King had been examined and canonised by Bishop Grimkjell.

Part of the St. Olav altar frontal in Nidaros Cathedral (ca 1320) depicts Translatio Olavi, when Bishop Grimkjell on 3 August 1031 finds the body intact, sweet-scented and with hair and nails having grown since the King died. Encouraged by the people's demand, he canonises Olav. «The King's body was carried into St. Clement's Church and placed over the high altar. The coffin was covered with costly cloths. Soon many miracles took place because of King Olav's holiness», writes Snorri Sturluson, our main source.

== The saint ==
A chapel was built on the river bank where Olav had first been buried, and tradition says the altar was erected over the place where the King’s body had been buried. Tradition also says the high altar of Nidaros Cathedral has since been on this spot. King Olav was 35 when he died, and had taken part in twenty major battles. «Where in the world's northern parts have people known a more prominent prince? The King died far too early», said court poet Sigvat Skald.

Of the earthly Olav Haraldsson the martyr, the heavenly king, was born. The veneration of the saint quickly spread far beyond Norway’s borders. A cathedral was built to hold the King's canonised body. Pilgrimages to St. Olav's Shrine continued for the next five centuries until the reformation in 1537, and Nidaros became the most popular place of pilgrimage in northern Europe. The high choir (the octagon) of Nidaros Cathedral, where the saint King was resting behind the altar, was known as Cor Norvegiae – Norway’s heart.

In 1153 Trondheim's ecclesial significance was enhanced by the erection there of the Archiepiscopal See of Nidaros.

Since the 9th century Norway's kings had been approved at Øretinget, the old ting wall at the Nidelven estuary, in today’s Trondheim. Harald Hårfagre (865–933) was taken king here. Under King Harald Hardråde (1015–1066) the unification of Norway was fulfilled, and Trondheim’s status also as the political capital confirmed. From 1204 an extra dimension was added to the approval of a new king: he now had to swear his oath on St. Olav's Shrine. The ceremony was moved to the cathedral grounds, and Norwegian kings were now understood to reign on behalf of Norway's Eternal King – Rex perpetuus Norvegiae – St. Olav.

== Restoration ==
In 1930, 900 years after King Olav's death at Stiklestad, 29 July, St. Olav's Day, was reintroduced in Norway's calendar as Olsok (Olav's Vigil, actually the eve of St. Olav's Day). The day had then been out of the calendar since Danish-Norwegian ecclesial legislation had removed it in 1542, due to the reformation. However, St. Olav's Day had never been absent from the popular calendar and tradition. The axe in Norway's coat of arms and in the traditional ecclesial coat of arms Olavsmerket, show that the memory of the saint king had never left the official language of symbols.

Since its re-establishment in Norway in 1843, the Roman Catholic Church has celebrated Olsok, St. Olav's Day, as a major feast in the church calendar. And since the Olsok renewal from the late 19th century, St. Olav's Day has also been celebrated in some of the (Lutheran) Church of Norway's churches, not the least in Nidaros Cathedral.

== The first and the second shrine ==
There were three St. Olav's shrines. The first was the original wooden coffin from Stiklestad, covered by expensive cloth. The second was a costly shrine that according to Snorre Sturlasson was made by King Magnus Olavsson (1035–1047), Olav's son. This shrine was probably a wooden coffin covered by silver plates with religious motifs. To the silver plates were fixed valuable jewels. This shrine was two metres long and with a width and height of about 80 centimetres. The lid had the shape of a house roof. The original coffin was kept inside this shrine.

Some house-roof-like relic shrines preserved in Norway and Iceland are believed to be small copies of Saint Olav's Shrine.

== The third shrine ==
Documents written by Archbishop Olav Engelbrektsson in the 1530s, describe the shrine:

- « ... St. Olav's Shrine was covered with silver. It had no bottom. It was covering two other shrines, and in the innermost shrine was the entire body of St. Olav ...»

Shrines consisting of several shrines, the one covering the other, are known from other places, like the Shrine of St. Cuthbert in Durham Cathedral in England.

Erik Valkendorf (1465–1522), archbishop of Nidaros 1510 – 1522, allegedly bought a costly jewel which was fixed to one end of St. Olav’s Shrine. For this he paid 20 lasts of butter. Unimaginable values were gathered in Nidaros Cathedral in Catholic times. The only valuable medieval object left in the cathedral today is golden chalice from the 16th century. The rest of the valuables disappeared abroad due to the reformation.

== What happened to St. Olav's Shrine? ==
Rumours have circulated on the shrine's fate after the reformation, one is that it was lost in an unconfirmed shipwreck off Agdenes in the Trondheim Fjord on its way to Copenhagen.

Archaeologist Øystein Ekroll at Nidaros Cathedral's Restoration Works has collected what is known about the shrine's fate in an article.

Archbishop Olav Engelbrektsson left Trondheim 1 April, Easter Day, 1537. His intention was to return with a sea and land forces to defend the country against King Christian III. At his castle Steinvikholm off Skatval further east in the Trondheim Fjord, the archbishop had left a military force equipped to withstand protracted siege. At the castle he had also left behind the country's most valuable relics, among them St. Olav's Shrine, which had been moved there from Nidaros Cathedral some months before.

The archbishop fled to Lier in the Netherlands, today in Belgium, since 1523 the exile town for his allied King Christian II of Denmark-Norway. Here Olav Engelbrektsson died already on 7 February 1538, and was buried in the town's St. Gummarus Church. In the meantime his force at Steinvikholm had capitulated, and all valuables at the castle fallen into Danish hands. Five days later, on 3 June 1537, a list was made of all objects at the castle:

- «In the tower called the Farmer: Saint Olav's Shrine in which he rests, Saint Augustine's (Archbishop Øystein Erlendsson's) Shrine which is of silver, a saint's shrine of gilded copper, a Saint Olav's bowl of silver-covered tree.»

All valuables were smashed and taken to Copenhagen for melting. A receipt from the King's treasurer Jochum Bech to Christoffer Huitfelt, governor of Trøndelag and responsible for the transport to Copenhagen, is dated 9 September 1540. Bech signed for 95 kilo silver, from Saint Olav's Shrine, two large gilded silver buttons, 170 silver-set crystals and 11 jewels that fell from the shrine when it was smashed. From the shrine holding St. Olav's shirts came 2.6 kilos of gilded silver and a number of enamelled gold plates.

== The last part of St. Olav's Shrine ==
During excavations at Steinvikholm in the 1880s several objects were found, among them a rounded transparent crystal. Such stones were popular in the Middle Ages and were often used to decorate relic shrines. According to Øystein Ekroll this stone may be the known part of Saint Olav's Shrine, as it is probably the twelfth in addition to the eleven stones listed in 1537. The stone is exhibited in the Suhm House at the NTNU Museum of Natural History and Archaeology in Trondheim.

Denmark has never paid any compensation to Norway for the destruction of St. Olav's Shrine and the theft of silver and jewels.

== What happened to St. Olav's remains? ==
Only the innermost wooden coffin, with St. Olav's remains, was left at Steinvikholm when Danish soldiers had smashed the two outer shrines and taken the silver and other valuables to Copenhagen in 1540. Whether pilgrims came to St. Olav's coffin at Steinvikholm after the archbishop's departure at Easter 1537 is uncertain, but in 1552 the first Lutheran bishop in Trondheim – Danish Hans Gaas – went to Copenhagen to hear the King's opinion on returning St. Olav's remains to Nidaros Cathedral.

Twenty-four years after the shrine had been left behind at Steinvikholm, the Nordic Seven-Year War led to Swedish occupation of the area in the spring of 1564. Swedish soldiers now moved the wooden coffin from the castle to Fløan Chapel on the mainland near by. Already on 8 June that same year, after Swedish forces had been driven back, the coffin with St. Olav's body was brought "in great procession" from Fløan to Nidaros Cathedral, and lowered into a brick grave inside the church. It is now uncertain where this grave is.

Differences between three 16th-century descriptions of St. Olav's body may indicate that it might have been another body that was brought back to the cathedral in 1564. Of the three descriptions, only the first one – former pupil at Nidaros Cathedral School and later Presiding Magistrate Jon Simonsson's from 1521, written down by Lutheran Vicar Peder Claussøn Friis in the 1570s – notes that the King’s face is bearded. Archbishop Olav Engelbrektsson's description from the time when the shrine was moved to Steinvikholm, probably in 1536, notes that the King is not bearded, while Palace Chaplain Absalon Pedersson Beyer's description from 1567 is silent on the matter. Should a change of bodies have taken place after 1521, Archbishop Olav Engelbrektsson may have found it best for posterity to hide the King’s body at the castle, or even in the cathedral before moving the shrine to the castle.

All three descriptions speak of an intact, dry body, without any trace of decay. Olav Engelbrektsson's description of 1536:

- "... in the innermost shrine Saint Olav’s body was resting intact with skin, flesh and bone, no limb divided from the other. The body was wrapped in double linen. The linen closest to the body was somewhat decayed, while next layer of linen was quite strong. Covering the body was a broad piece of silk, yellow and red with woven flowers, at first sight looking like a piece of guilt [sic] and figured leather. It was quite unspoiled and looked as if it was no more than three years old. Alongside in the middle of the same piece of silk, were fixed two crosses in carmine red. Olav's face was completely intact with flesh and skin, his eyes somewhat sunken; the hairs of his eyebrows were clearly visible. The tip of his nose was partly lacking, his lips were somewhat inverted, his teeth were in place and were white. His jaw was quite intact, but there was no beard on it. When touching his thighs, skin and flesh could clearly be felt. Also on his feet, skin, flesh and sinews were unspoiled. But when touching his toes, they felt like they were withered. A good scent came from his body, and there was no abomination to it. All who were present could clearly see this. And he has been a tall man".

The year after the return from Fløan to the cathedral, in 1565, the wooden coffin was taken out of the brick grave. The body was now given a new wooden coffin and lowered into another, probably new, grave in the cathedral. Neither the location of this grave is known today. Many of those who were present at this moment, threw gold and silver coins in the grave, in the honour of God and St. Olav.

Three years later, in the spring of 1568 – 31 years after the reformation, Danish Minister Jørgen Lykke let "earth fill the grave of St. Olav's body", to put an end to pilgrimages to what until now had been a known grave in the cathedral. Whether it was the 1565 grave that was closed, or whether the remains now were moved to a third grave, known to only a few, is unclear. As those who knew the location of the grave that was closed in 1568 gradually died over the next decades, this grave went into oblivion. However, in the late 20th century Vicar Olav Müller in St. Olav's Catholic Cathedral in Trondheim, learned that the knowledge of the location of this grave was still kept in some families in Trondheim.

After the extensive restoration works in Nidaros Cathedral in the last half of the 19th century, it is assumed that St. Olav's remains were either taken out of the 1568 grave and moved to an unmarked common grave in the north part of the cathedral cemetery in the 1860s, when post-reformation burials were removed from the cathedral. Or, the grave that was closed in 1568 may still be among the medieval graves – anonymised in the late 1800s – under the cathedral's floor. A third possibility is that St. Olav's remains are among pre-reformation remains that due to restoration works in the late 1800s were taken out of their graves and stored in a wooden box in the crypt, later to be moved to the Cathedral Architect's office. These remains were mentioned by Steinar Bjerkestrand, director at the Nidaros Cathedral Restoration Workshop in an interview on the Norwegian Broadcasting Corporation's regional programmes (NRK-Trøndelag) on 5 April 2013. Bjerkestrand said the remains represent 14 persons. Shortly before this the remains had been brought back to the Cathedral's crypt in a locked metal box.

In late 1993 Trondheim architect Bodvar Schjelderup proposed that one should look for the possible grave of Olav in two places in Nidaros Cathedral: in a brick grave under the floor close to today's pulpit, and under the floor near the northern octagon chapel. The Bishop of Nidaros at the time, Finn Wagle, and the Director for Cultural Heritage of the time, Øivind Lunde, chose not to follow up the proposal.

In 2003 Øystein Ekroll wrote that a possible location for St. Olav's grave, if the King is still resting in the cathedral, may be under 17th-century burials in one of the three octagon chapels. These parts have not been excavated. There are also other areas under the cathedral that have not been excavated. On 5 April 2013 Bishop Tor Singsaas of Nidaros told the NRK-Trøndelag that he welcomes new investigations in the Cathedral.

On 24 January 2014 the NRK-Trøndelag reported that the Nidaros Cathedral Restoration Workshop had started examinations in the octagon, also in the eastern octagon chapel. Archeologists from the Norwegian University of Science and Technology (NTNU) were using georadar to look for irregularities under the floor, guided by archeologist Øystein Ekroll and followed by the NRK science programme Newton. Bishop Tor Singsaas of Nidaros told the NRK that he was happy that such examinations now were possible.

On 23 February 2014 NRK Newton reported that the Norwegian University of Science and Technology (NTNU) georadar examinations had found a possible grave 1.5 metres under the floor in the eastern octagon chapel in Nidaros Cathedral, partly under the chapel's altar. Ekroll said in the programme that this may be Saint Olav's grave. He said this should now be further examined, preferably by the help of archeological excavations. The georadar examinations had confirmed the location of a grave under the floor north of the southern octagon chapel, where written sources say King Magnus the Good, Olav Haraldsson's son, had been buried. The georadar examinations also indicate that already the choir of the first wooden church here, located where the present octagon stands, may have been octagonal as in other early martyr's churches.

On 6 March, 2026 a public initiative in the form of a petition titled Olaf: 2030 was created by Evan Walser advocating for the archaeological investigation of the possible grave discovered under the floor in the eastern octagon chapel of Nidaros Cathedral. The petition received the endorsement from French paleopathologist Dr. Philippe Charlier on 29 April, 2026.

== Possible St. Olav relic in Oslo ==
The only known relic of St. Olav in modern time is the Arm Relic, given by King Oscar I of Sweden and Norway to St. Olav's Catholic Cathedral in Oslo in 1862. The relic, which is a human calf bone and not an arm bone, had then been kept in the Danish National Museum in Copenhagen since the late 17th century. The relic may have come to Copenhagen among several St. Olav relics that King Christian II of Denmark-Norway had requested from Nidaros after his coronation in Oslo in the summer of 1514.

According to Øystein Ekroll it was only in the early 1800s that this relic was linked to St. Olav. Before this its history has not been documented.

The relic was in 2012 examined by Professor Per Holck, a University of Oslo anatomist, at the request of historian Øystein Morten and with the permission of Bishop Bernt Ivar Eidsvig of the Catholic Diocese of Oslo. Results were published by Morten and Holck on 16 March 2013.

Examinations confirm that the relic is the left calf bone of a male who died in a time span covering 1030, and who had been in battle. At his death, the person has been about the age of Olav Haraldsson. As a child he had been raised on an inland diet. The person may have been unusually tall for the period, about 180 centimetres (71 in). Also, tissue remains indicate that the bone may belong to a body that has been mummified and not buried. This may indicate that the relic is genuine, as St. Olav's body was never buried but was kept swaddled in cloths in its shrine for centuries, initially in St. Clemen's Church and then in Nidaros Cathedral.

In the calf bone in St. Olav Cathedral in Oslo, remains of mitochondrial DNA, inherited only from the mother, were found. An obvious next step would be to compare this with possible similar DNA traces in the remains of Olav Haraldsson's half-brother on the mother's side, King Harald Hardråde. His remains are thought to still rest in their grave in the ruins of Helgeseter (Elgseter) Augustinian Priory at Øya in Trondheim, under the street of Klostergata, between Klostergata 47 and 60–62. Excavations here depend on an initiative by the Norwegian Directorate for Cultural Heritage.

== Sources ==
- Johs. J. Duin: Streiftog i norsk kirkehistorie 1450–1880, (Oslo: St. Olavs forlag) 1984
- Øystein Ekroll: St. Olavs skrin i Nidaros – myter og fakta omkring Nordens største helgenskrin, in periodical SPOR, no 2. 2000
- Øystein Ekroll: St. Olavs skrin i Nidaros, in Ecclesia Nidrosiensis 1153–1537, (Trondheim : Tapir akademisk forlag) 2003
- Edvard Hoem: St. Olavs skrin, (Oslo: Dramatikk) 1988
- Lars Roar Langslet: Olav den Hellige, (Oslo: Gyldendal) 1995
- Øystein Morten: Jakten på Olav den hellige, (Oslo: Spartacus Forlag) 1995
- Øivind Østang: Hjem til Nidaros – Norges nølende vandring siden 1814, (Oslo: Genesis) 1997
