= Halvor Bergan =

Norwegian theologian and priest

Right Reverend Doctor Halvor Bergan
- Bishop
- Church: Church of Norway
- Diocese: Diocese of Agder
- Appointed: 1983
- In office: 1983–1998

Orders
- Ordination: 1958 by Bishop Karl Marthinussen

Personal details
- Born: 8 August 1931 Skien, Norway
- Died: 3 May 2015 (aged 83)
- Denomination: Christian
- Occupation: Priest
- Education: D.Th.: University of Oslo

Halvor Bergan (8 August 1931 – 3 May 2015) was a Norwegian theologian and priest. He served as the Bishop of the Diocese of Agder from 1983 until his retirement in 1998.

== Personal life ==
He was born 8 August 1931 in Skien in Telemark county, Norway. He died on 3 May 2015.

== Education and career ==
Bergan graduated from the Menighetsfakultetet school in 1957 with a Cand.theol. degree. He was ordained by the Bishop of the Diocese of Stavanger, Karl Marthinussen, in 1958. Later, in 1980, he graduated from the University of Oslo with a Doctor of Theology degree, with a thesis on church history.

He began his career in 1958 as an assistant priest in Håland Municipality, just west of Stavanger. Then, in 1966, he took a new job as an assistant priest at Solum Church, just west of Skien. From 1971 to 1980, he was the first parish priest for the new parish of Nenset in Solum. From 1980 until 1983, he served as the parish priest of Sauherad Municipality. In 1983, Halvor Bergan was appointed to be the Bishop of the Diocese of Agder, based at Kristiansand Cathedral. He held this role until the end of 1998 when he retired and moved to Melum in Skien.

== Works ==
- Skriftemål og skriftestol. Skriftemålet i Den norske kirke fra reformasjonen til i dag (1982 – his doctoral thesis)
- Ord fra prekestolen (1993)

Religious titles
Preceded by Erling Utnem	Bishop of Agder; 1983–1998	Succeeded by Olav Skjevesland
