= MF Norwegian School of Theology, Religion and Society =

Seminary in Oslo, Norway

- MF vitenskapelig høyskole for teologi, religion og samfunn
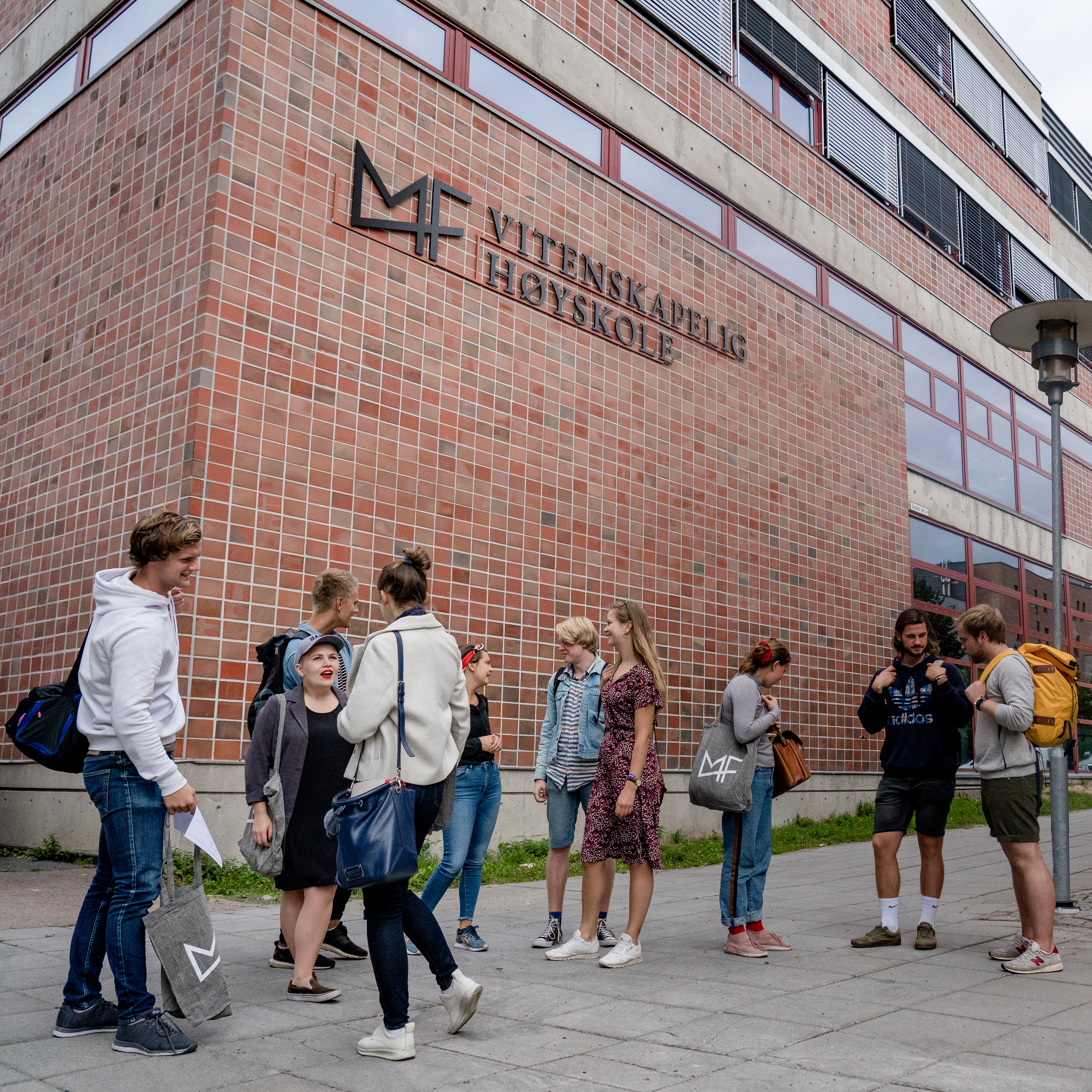
- Motto: In Principio Erat Verbum
- Type: Private
- Established: 1907; 119 years ago
- Rector: Sturla Johan Stålsett
- Director: Agnes Ellinor Skagemo
- Administrative staff: 500
- Students: 1,300
- Location: Oslo, Norway; 59°55′57.99″N 10°42′48.67″E
- Affiliations: The Norwegian Association of Higher Education Institutions; IMHE; the Nordic University Association
- Website: mf.no

MF Norwegian School of Theology, Religion and Society (MF for short) is a Norwegian private specialized university. MF focuses on education, research and dissemination of their fields of expertise. The specialized university is located at Majorstuen in Oslo.

MF was founded in 1907 as an independent theological institution at university level and is Norway's largest provider of theological education and research. MF has around 120 employees, 1000 students and about 50 Ph.D. candidates. MF educates for various church professions and offers a 5-years master in education, as well as various study programs on Ph.D., masters and bachelor level. Students are educated for professions within the church, education and society. MF has from 1967 offered education within Christianity and other religions for use in school and society, in addition to theology.

MF was awarded status as a specialized university in 2005, and is one of three private specialized universities in Norway, along with BI and VID. The institution changed its name from Det teologiske menighetsfakultet to its current name in August 2018.

== History ==
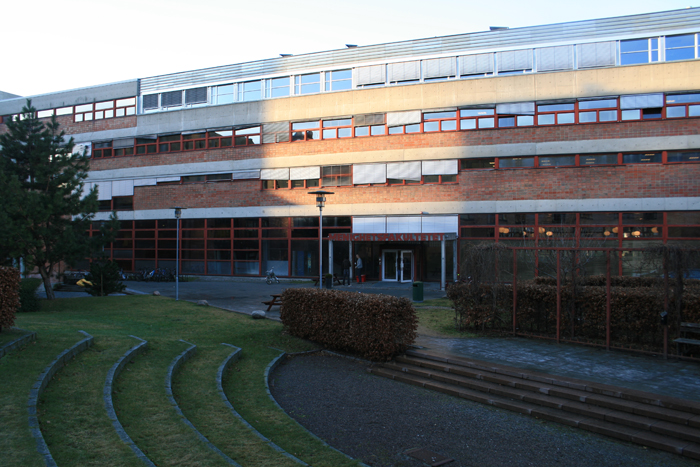
Campus

The Faculty of Theology was founded in 1907 by a body of Norwegian academics, politicians, clergy and lay people wanting to offer a theological education founded on the Holy Scriptures and the Lutheran Confessions. The faculty was founded as an alternative to the Faculty of Theology at the University of Oslo.

The founding charter was signed October 16, 1907, and the school was opened in the autumn of 1908 with only eight students (a number that increased to fourteen before the end of the first term). The earliest teachers were Sigurd Odland (New Testament), Edvard Sverdrup (church history), Peter Hognestad (Old Testament), Ole Hallesby (systematic theology). From 1919, academic staff members were granted the right to call themselves professors.

The institution was granted the right to offer degrees in theology in 1913, as well as in practical theology from 1925 and cand. Philol in 1977. In 1990, the institution was given the right to offer doctoral degrees and in 2005 the school was accredited as a specialized university institution by NOKUT.

In August 2018, the institution changed its name from Det teologiske menighetsfakultet to MF Norwegian School of Theology, Religion and Society. MF today offers a large subject portfolio in the areas of theology, religion and society, and focuses particularly in the intersection of religion and society. MF has in addition a 5 year program in education of religion, ethics and society, and a practical, pedagogical education. In addition to offer a priest education, MF educates deacons and catechists for the Church of Norway, as well as leaders for other church- and religious communities.

== Academics ==
MF awards bachelor, masters, candidatus/a theologiae and Ph.D. degrees, as well as dr. philos.

== Research centers at MF ==
MF KOM – Center for Excellence in Research, Development and Communication for Church and Congregation. This center is an intermediary between scholars at MF and church workers who wish to utilize MF's competency in their own contexts.

MF CASR – Center for the Advanced Study of Religion organizes the research on religion done at MF. It facilitates joint projects between MF and other institutions. MF CASR encompasses areas of research including religious studies, history of religion, philosophy of religion, texts and manuscript research, cultural and art history, along with sociology of religion.

MF has a number of externally financed research projects financed by ERC, The Research Council of Norway and other institutions.

== Notable alumni and faculty staff ==
=== Alumni ===
- Andreas Grasmo

==== Politicians ====
- Kjell Magne Bondevik
- Valgerd Svarstad Haugland
- Torild Skogsholm
- Helen Bjørnøy

==== Musicians ====
- Bjørn Eidsvåg
- Morten Harket

==== Authors ====
- Jan Kjærstad
- Ole Hallesby

==== Clergy ====
- Helga Haugland Byfuglien, Presiding Bishop in the Church of Norway
- Ole Christian Kvarme, Bishop of Oslo
- Gunnar Stålsett, Bishop Emeritus of Oslo
- Andreas Aarflot, Bishop Emeritus of Oslo
- Stein Reinertsen, Bishop of Agder and Telemark
- Olav Skjevesland, Bishop Emeritus of Agder and Telemark
- Halvor Bergan, Bishop Emeritus of Agder and Telemark
- Per Arne Dahl, Bishop of Tunsberg
- Laila Riksaasen Dahl, Bishop Emeritus of Tunsberg
- Olav Øygard, Bishop of Nord Hålogaland
- Per Oskar Kjølaas, Bishop Emeritus of Nord Hålogaland
- Erling Pettersen, Bishop of Stavanger
- Ernst Baasland, Bishop Emeritus of Stavanger
- Tor Singsaas, Bishop of Nidaros
- Herborg Finnset, Bishop of Nidaros
- Finn Wagle, Bishop Emeritus of Nidaros
- Halvor Nordhaug, Bishop of Bjørgvin
- Ole D. Hagesæther, Bishop Emeritus of Bjørgvin
- Ingeborg Midttømme, Bishop of Møre
- Odd Bondevik, Bishop Emeritus of Møre
- Atle Sommerfelt, Bishop of Borg
- Per Lønning, Bishop Emeritus of Borg and Bjørgvin
- Solveig Fiske, Bishop of Hamar
- Tor Berger Jørgensen, Bishop of Sør-Hålogaland
- Øystein I. Larsen, Bishop Emeritus of Sør-Hålogaland
- Olav Fykse Tveit, General Secretary, World Council of Churches
- Trond Bakkevig, Canon, Provost of Vestre Aker

=== Faculty staff ===
==== Teacher education ====
- Geir Sigmund Afdal
- Trine Anker
- Janicke Heldal
- Binta-Victoria Jammeh
- Claudia Lenz
- Ann Midttun
- Merethe Skårås
- Emil Sætra
- Audun Toft
- Torbjørg Torp

==== Social sciences ====
- Munkhnaran Bayarlkhagva
- Maria Dumitru
- Marielle Stigum Gleiss
- Øystein Bjarte Hellevik
- Andreas Holmedahl Hvidsten
- Bushra Ishaq
- Lars Åsmund Laird Iversen
- Solvor Mjøberg Lauritzen
- Christine Lillethun Norheim
- Maren Seehawer
- Ingrid Storm
- Sturla Johan Stålsett

==== Religious studies ====
- Robert Emil Berge
- Torkel Brekke
- Blossom Gordana Champlain
- Anita Christensen
- Romain Grégory David
- Silje Lyngar Einarsen
- Iselin Frydenlund
- Victor Ghica
- Aaltje Hidding
- Sebastian Tjelle Jarmer
- Fridtjof Willem Leemhuis
- Gina Lende
- Liv Ingeborg Lied
- Fredrik Liland
- Ariadne Kostomitsopoulou Marketou
- Verena Hanna Meyer
- Matthew Phillip Monger
- Matthias Müller
- Brent Nongbri
- Zeshan Ullah Qureshi
- Moumita Sen
- Theang Teron
- Rhiannon Williams

==== Psychology of religion and existential psychology ====
- Lars Johan Danbolt
- Peter La Cour
- Charlotte Rosenberg
- Tatjana Schnell
- Gry Stålsett

==== Systematic theology ====
- Ragnar Misje Bergem
- Asle Eikrem
- Tron Fagermoen
- Roar G. Fotland
- Kristin Graff-Kallevåg
- Marion Grau
- Harald Hegstad
- Jan-Olav Henriksen
- Gunnhild Nordgaard Hermstad
- Tollef Graff Hugo
- Espen Løkhammer
- Hilde Marie Øgreid Movafagh
- Andrew Ratanya Mukaria
- Jeppe Bach Nikolajsen
- Filip Rasmussen
- Odd Ketil Sæbø
- Atle Ottesen Søvik

==== Practical theology ====
- Silje Merete Kivle Andreassen
- Ingerid Louise Birkeland
- Einar Eidsaa Edland
- Kjetil Haga
- Ingvild Lalim Hanseid
- Camilla Jørgensen
- Dorte Kappelgaard
- Tone Stangeland Kaufman
- Carl Petter Opsahl
- Liv Arnhild Romsaas
- Linn Sæbø Rystad
- Astrid Sandsmark
- Fredrik Saxegaard
- Stephen Sirris
- Elisa Stokka
- Knut Tveitereid
- Inge Westly

==== Church history ====
- Øyvind Brun Andersen
- Per Kristian Aschim
- Otfried Czaika
- John Wayne Kaufman
- Carina Lasch Lind
- Olav Refvem

==== Old Testament / Hebrew Bible ====
- Gard Granerød
- Kristin Joachimsen
- Andrew Donald Wergeland
- Ingunn Aadland

==== New Testament ====
- James Crossly
- Gregory Peter Fewster
- Ole Jacob Filtvedt
- Morten Hørning Jensen
- Chris Keith
- Mina Monier
- Justin David Strong
- Hanne Birgitte Sødal Tveito
- Glenn Øystein Wehus

==== Emeriti ====
- Torleiv Austad
- Erling Birkedal
- Ernst Baasland
- Leif Gunnar Engedal
- Tormod Engelsviken
- Peder Gravem
- Terje Hegertun
- Gunnar Harald Heiene
- Reidar Hvalvik
- Heid Leganger-Krogstad
- Sverre Dag Mogstad
- Kristin Norseth
- Bernt T. Oftestad
- Arild Romarheim
- Karl Olav Sandnes
- Bjørn Helge Sandvei
- Kjell Olav Sannes
- Jan Schumacher
- Oskar Skarsaune
- Magne Sæbø
- Svein Olaf Thorbjørnsen
- Karl William Weyde
- Tore Wigen
- Lars Østnor
- Andreas Aarflot
