= 2011 Church of Norway elections =

2011 elections within the Church of Norway

The Church of Norway held elections on September 11 and 12 2011. The election dates and poll stations were the same as those of the municipal elections for Norway).

The nation's 11 bishoprics were elected.

== Diocesan councils ==
In the Church of the campaign was created two lists of recommendations of candidates to vote for, one from the campaign, "Grandfather Child" and one from the alliance, "Raus national church." Among the 77 representatives were elected, was 34 on the list to sire children, while 29 were on the list to Generous national church.

=== Results of direct elections ===
55 representatives were elected to the country's 11 diocesan council in the direct election round. 32 of the representatives were re-elected from the previous period. 53% of the elected representatives are women, and the average age is 47.4 years.

- Diocese of Oslo
  - Frederick Arstad, student, Klemetsrud, 22 years
  - Marius Berge Eide, student, Frogner, 21år
  - Kristin Gunleiksrud, advisor, Asker, 50 years
  - Karin -Elin Berg, senior adviser, Mark, 33 years
  - Harald Hegstad, Professor, Mortensrud, 51
  - Knut Lundby, Professor, Haslum, 63 years
  - Aud Kvalbein, deputy mayor, Nordstrand, 63 years
- Diocese of Hamar
  - Ingrun Jule, department, Elverum, 40 years
  - Sigmund Rye Berg, retired, Stange, 72 years
  - Anne-Lise Brenna Ording, occupational therapist, Wings, 24 years
  - Reidar Asgard, Chairman, Southern Elvdal, 68 years
  - Eleanor Brenna, student / environmental therapist, Brøttum, 52 years
  - Tori Kristiansen, kindergarten boards, Vardal, 50 years
  - Roald Braathen, retirement, Brandbu, 65 years
- Diocese of Stavanger
  - Svein Arne Lindø, care manager, Riska, 58 years
  - Marie Klakegg Gras Tveit, finance trainee, Viking and Orstad, 26 years
  - Liv Hjørdis Glette, teacher, Our Saviour (Haugesund), 52 years
  - Leif Christian Andersen, nurse, Bekkefaret, 26 years
  - Silje Arnevik Barkved, theology student, Lura, 25 years
  - Tor Soppeland, farmer, Årdal, 63 years
  - Gyrid Espeland, Section Chief, Eigerøy, 58 years
- Diocese of Sør-Hålogaland
  - Einar Bovim, Assistant Professor, Narvik, 31 years
  - Day Jostein Fjærvoll, retirement, Hadsel 64 years of
  - Mari Haave Dvergsdal, student, Bodin, 21 years
  - Reimar Brown, principal, Øksnes, 59 years
  - Tanja Nyjordet, supervisor, northern Rana, 44 years
  - Marit Hermstad, department, Sandnessjøen, 57 years
  - Trude Stensvik Kaspersen, accountant, Henningsvær, 37
- North Hålogaland
  - Gunhild Marie Andreassen, personnel manager, Kvaløy, 42 years
  - Andreas Gotliebsen, student, Kanebogen, 23 years
  - Nils N. Mathis Eira, bus driver/owner, Kautokeino, 67 years
  - Geir Ludvigsen, university, Tromsø Cathedral, 43
  - Mette-Marit Sørum Granerud, lecturer, Alta, 53 years
  - Anne Marie Hill, Assistant Professor, Kvæfjord, 67 years
  - Jarle-Wilfred Andreassen, department, Nesseby, 53 years

These dioceses had direct election of four members, indirect election of three members:

- Diocese of Borg
  - Brown Anne Andersen, teacher/counselor, Kråkerøy 62 years
  - Frøydis Ingjerd No, student, Hurdal, 24 years
  - Aarflot Andreas Henriksen, student, Hillsborough, 22 years
  - Jofrid Trandem Myhre, head/senior tax lawyer, Jeløy, 47 years
- Diocese of Nidaros
  - Ola Torgeir Lånke, former Member of Parliament, Rennebu, 63 years
  - Solveig Kopperstad Bratseth, senior advisor NAV, Tempe, 53 years
  - Trude Holm, county council group leader, Stiklestad, 59 years
  - Grete Folden, farmer / general manager, Beitstad, 43

These dioceses had direct election of three members, indirect election of four members:

- Diocese of Tunsberg
  - Harald Askeland, Professor, Torød, 48 years
  - Ingjerd Sørhaug Bratsberg, teacher / nurse, Sande, 43
  - Hilde-Solveig Trøgstad Johnsen, student, Lier, 21 years
- Diocese of Agder og Telemark
  - Øivind Benestad, Information Officer, Vågsbygd, 57 years
  - Jan Olav Olsen, the principal, Gjerstad, 61
  - Kjetil Drangsholt, doctor, Cathedral, 61
- Diocese of Bjorgvin
  - Cathrine Halstensen, einingsleiar, Bergen Cathedral, 33
  - Egil Morland, college professor, Mountain, 61
  - Nils Dagestad, farmer / pensioner, Voss, 68 years
- Diocese of Møre
  - Modulf Aukan, farmer, Tustna, 63 years
  - Målfrid Synnøve Isene, student, Volda, 22 years
  - Lisbeth May Hovlid Aurdal, mission consultant, Sykkylven, 52 years

=== Results from indirect ballot ===
22 employees' representatives, one from representant Deaf Church and 3 Sami representatives were elected by their own choice. The bishop of each diocese has a permanent place in the Diocesan Council. In addition, selected the newly elected parish councils in the six dioceses of the 22 representatives in the indirect election round.

- Diocese of Oslo
  - Priest: Anne Berit Løvstad Evangeline, chaplain, Rødtvedt
  - Children's Church staff: Elin Oveland, religious education director, Østenstad
  - Deaf Church : Knut Rune Saltnes
  - Bishop: Ole Christian Kvarme
- Diocese of Hamar
  - Priest: Ole Kristian Farmer, pastor, Elverum
  - Children's Church staff: Dag Landmark, churchwarden, Gjøvik
  - Bishop : Solveig Fiske
- Diocese of Stavanger
  - Priest: Berit Magnhild Espeseth, pastor, Sørnes
  - Children's Church staff: Terje Fjeldheim, churchwarden, Tysvær
  - Bishop: Erling J. Pettersen
- Diocese of South Hålogaland
  - Priest: Kristine Sandmæl, pastor, Vogan
  - Children's Church staff: Arne Tveit, churchwarden, Vestvågøy
  - Sami Representative: Mareno Mikkelsen
  - Bishop: Tor Berger Jørgensen
- Diocese of Nord-Hålogaland
  - Priest: Sigurd Skollevoll, Dean, Senja
  - Children's Church staff: Oddhild Klevberg, catechist, Alta
  - Sami Representative: Liv Eli Holmestrand
  - Bishop: Per Oskar Kjølaas
- Diocese of Borg
  - Priest: Arne Risholm Leon, pastor, Greåker
  - Children's Church staff: Jan-Erik Sundby, churchwarden, Sarpsborg
  - Bishop: Atle Sommerfeldt
  - Erling Birkedal, researcher, Nittedal
  - Bjorn Solberg, principal, Mysen
  - Anne Gangnes Kleiven, teacher, Romskog
- Diocese of Nidaros
  - Priest: Kjartan Bergslid, pastor, South Innherad
  - Children's Church staff: Helge Nilsen, churchwarden, Åfjord
  - Sami Representative: Nils Bertil Inari Jønsson
  - Bishop: Thu Singsaas
  - Agnes Sophie Gjeset, year-Seamen's Church, Fosnes
  - Gabriel Eikli, senior, Orkdal
  - Gunnar Winther, head of the unit, Steinkjer
- Diocese of Tunsberg
  - Priest: Silvie Kristin Lewin, Vicar, Ramnes
  - Children's Church staff: Kjell Fred Dekko, churchwarden, Al
  - Bishop: Laila Riksaasen Dahl
  - Ingvild Kaslegard, teacher / Gestalt, Al
  - Merethe Kjønnø Dahl, supervisor, Horten
  - Kjell Rune Wirges, const. section, Nanset
  - Ingjerd Breian Hedberg, indep. employed, Sem
- Diocese of Agder og Telemark
  - Priest: Berit Bowerbank, pastor, Sauherad and Nes
  - Children's Church staff: Geir Ivar Bjerkestrand, organist, Froland
  - Bishop: Olav Skjevesland
  - Torstein Nordal, student, Nissedal
  - Karen Junker, Director of Education, Barbu
  - Berit Haugland, college lecturer, Kragerø
  - Martin Jakobsen, student, Oddernes
- Diocese of Bjorgvin
  - Priest: Ivar Braut, pastor, Birkeland
  - Children's Church staff: Tone Synnøve Øygard Steinkopf, cantor, Vaksdal
  - Bishop: Halvor Nordhaug
  - Inger Helene Something Violence Nordeide, development manager, Forde
  - Julie Ane Odegaard, PhD, Løvstakksiden
  - Berit Nøst Dale, college lecturer, Meland
  - Kari Synnøve Muri, physiotherapist / Public Health Coordinator, Olden
- Diocese of Møre
  - Priest: Per Eilert Orten, pastor, Aure
  - Children's Church staff: Kari Vatne, church educator, Spjelkavik
  - Bishop : Ingeborg Midttømme
  - Eldar Husøy, teacher, Ulstein
  - Ann-Kristin Sørvik, verger / indep. employed, Bremsnes
  - Hilde Bergsfjord Brunvoll, teacher / artist, Bolsøy
  - Marianne Hermann Brekken, student, Myrbostad

== Commentaries to the elections ==
"Two movements have, as in 2009, made their mark before the elections ... regarding homosexuality and questions about ekteskapsliturgi for gay people. The one group calls itself MorFarBarn while the counterpart calls itself Raus folkekirke "

== See also ==
- Church of Norway election, 2009
- Church of Norway election, 2015
