= Olav Skjevesland =

Norwegian theologian and priest (1942–2019)

Right Reverend Olav Skjevesland
- Bishop of Agder og Telemark; Primate of the Church of Norway
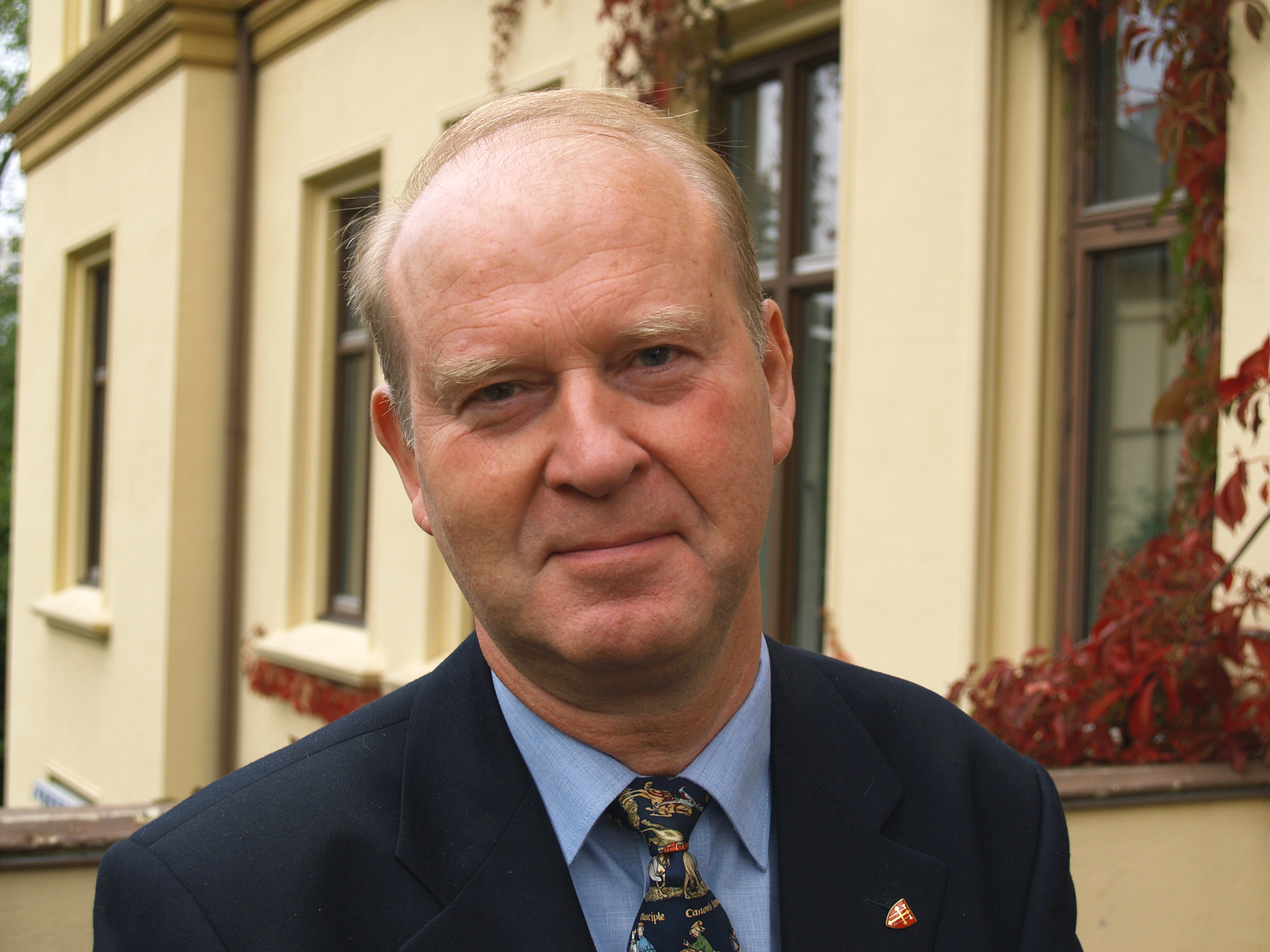
- Church: Church of Norway
- Diocese: Diocese of Agder og Telemark
- Appointed: 1998
- In office: 1998–2012

Orders
- Consecration: 1999 by Odd Bondevik

Personal details
- Born: 31 May 1942 Drøbak, Norway
- Died: 8 September 2019 (aged 77)
- Denomination: Christian
- Occupation: Priest
- Education: Cand.theol. (1967)
- Alma mater: Menighetsfakultet

Olav Skjevesland (31 May 1942 – 8 September 2019) was a Norwegian theologian and priest. He was the Bishop of the Diocese of Agder og Telemark from 1998 until his retirement in 2012, and since that time he was a Bishop Emeritus. He was also the Preses (Primus inter pares, "first among equals") and thus presided over the Bishops' Conference of the Church of Norway from 2006 until 2010. During his time as a bishop, he was considered to be theologically conservative and he was opposed to letting gay priests serve in the church.

== Personal life ==
Olav Skjevesland was born on 31 May 1942 in Drøbak in the Frogn municipality of Akershus county, Norway. His wife, Anne Katrine Skjevesland, died in 2009.

== Education and career ==
Skjevesland attended the Menighetsfakultet school, graduating in 1967 with a Cand.theol. degree, followed by taking the Practical Theology exam in 1969. His first job was as an assistant priest in the Nordstrand parish in Oslo from 1968 to 1972. Next, he was a lecturer with the Norwegian Diakonhjem organization from 1972 to 1974. He also worked as a secretary for the Norwegian priest's trade union from 1973 to 1975. From 1975 to 1976, Olav Skjevesland was a parish priest at the Kampen Church in Oslo. From 1976 until 1979, he became the resident chaplain at the Nøtterøy Church in Vestfold county.

In 1981, he was hired as the rector of the Menighetsfakultet's practical theological seminary, a position he held until 1994. He then took a job as professor at the same school from 1994 to 1998. In 1998, he was appointed to be the Bishop of the Diocese of Agder. In 2005, the diocese was renamed "Agder og Telemark" to fully represent the area that it covered. In 2006, he was elected for a four-year term as the Preses of the Bishops' Conference in the Church of Norway. In 2012, he retired from his job as bishop.

== Works ==
- Editor of Luthersk Kirketidende from 1976 to 1998
- He wrote Tro og tradisjon i ny tid (2003)

Church of Norway titles
Preceded by Halvor Bergan	Bishop of Agder og Telemark; 1998–2012	Succeeded by Stein Reinertsen
Preceded by Finn Wagle	Preses of the Church of Norway; 2006–2010	Succeeded by Helga Haugland Byfuglien
