= Olav Fykse Tveit =

Norwegian theologian

The Most Reverend Olav Fykse Tveit
- Primate of the Church of Norway
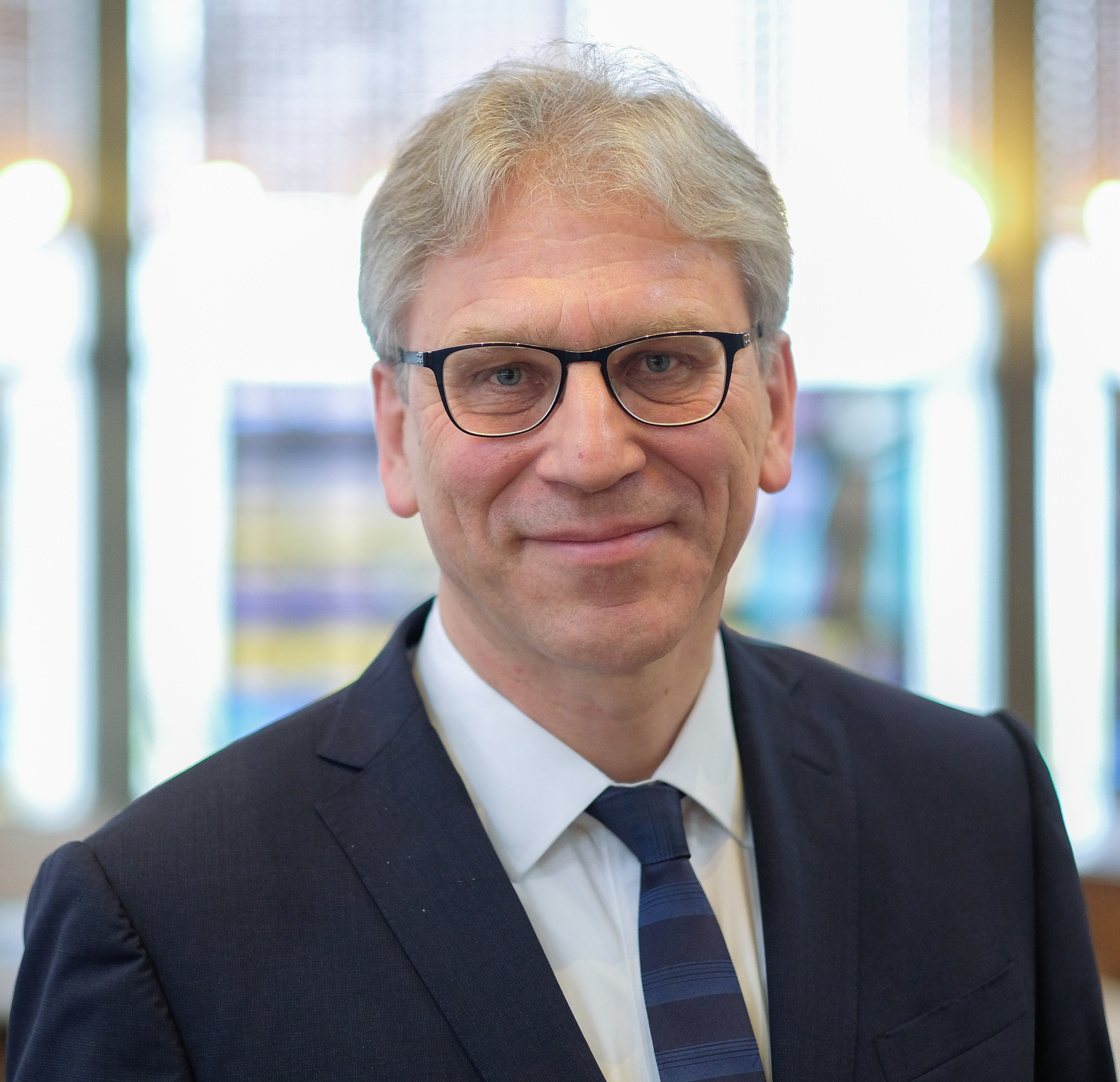
- Church: Church of Norway
- Elected: 30 January 2020
- In office: 2020–present
- Predecessor: Helga Haugland Byfuglien
- Previous post: General Secretary of the World Council of Churches (2010–2020)

Orders
- Ordination: 1987
- Consecration: 10 May 2020 by Atle Sommerfeldt

Personal details
- Born: 24 November 1960 (age 65) Haugesund, Norway
- Denomination: Lutheran
- Spouse: Anna Bjorvatten Tveit
- Children: 3

Olav Fykse Tveit (born 24 November 1960) is a Norwegian Lutheran theologian and bishop, and the current Preses of the Bishops' Conference of the Church of Norway. He was elected to the post of general secretary of the World Council of Churches on 27 August 2009. He entered office on 1 January 2010, for a proposed term of five years, and was re-elected to a second term in July 2014. He resigned from the post in March 2020, having been elected Preses of the Bishops' Conference of the Church of Norway.

== Biography ==
Olav Fykse Tveit was general secretary of the World Council of Churches from 1 January 2010 to 31 March 2020, replacing the Rev. Samuel Kobia. He is an ordained priest (and presiding bishop) in the Church of Norway and has also served as a parish priest in Haram, Møre Diocese, 1988–91 and as an army chaplain during his compulsory year of national service in 1987–88. He was secretary for the Church of Norway Doctrinal Commission, 1999–2000, and Church-State Relations, 2001–02. From 2002 to 2009, Tveit was the general secretary of the Church of Norway Council on Ecumenical and International Relations. He served as a member of the board of directors and executive committee of the Christian Council of Norway, moderator of the Church of Norway - Islamic Council of Norway contact group and the same for the Jewish Congregation contact group. He also was a member of the Inter-Faith Council of Norway and a member of the board of trustees of Norwegian Church Aid.

Tveit was elected as the seventh general secretary of the World Council of Churches (WCC) in August 2009 during its Central Committee meeting and was re-elected to a second term in July 2014. Tveit is the youngest general secretary to have been elected since Willem Visser 't Hooft, who had led the WCC while it was in process of formation and following its founding assembly in 1948.

He stepped down as General Secretary of the WCC on 31 March 2020. On 17 October 2019 it was announced that he had been nominated to become the next Preses - Presiding Bishop - of the Church of Norway, from 2020. His appointment was announced on 30 January 2020 and he is set to assume the role in April 2020.

== Education ==
Tveit holds a Master in Theology (Candidate Theologiea) from the Norwegian School of Theology/Menighetsfakultetet (NST/MF), Oslo, and a doctorate in theology from the NST/MF, 2002. His doctorate is titled "Mutual Accountability as Ecumenical Attitude".

== Activities ==
Tveit is a member of the WCC Faith and Order Plenary Commission, co-chair of the WCC Palestine Israel Ecumenical Forum core group, a member of the board of directors and executive committee of the Christian Council of Norway, moderator of the Church of Norway - Islamic Council of Norway contact group and also of the Jewish Congregation contact group. He is also a member of the Inter-Faith Council of Norway and a member of the board of trustees of Norwegian Church Aid.

As general secretary of the World Council of Churches, Tveit has led the fellowship of churches through such gatherings as the International Ecumenical Peace Convocation (Kingston, Jamaica, 2011) and the 10th Assembly of the WCC (Busan, Republic of Korea, 2013). He has also been involved in international consultations on such topics as climate change, peacemaking and refugee resettlement.

In 2012, Tveit received the Friends of the Armenians Award for his advocacy worldwide. In 2013, King Abdullah II of Jordan presented him with the Al-Hussein Decoration for Distinguished Service in the field of inter-religious dialogue and cooperation in pursuit of peace among peoples.

In 2015, Hanshin University in Seoul, Republic of Korea, awarded him an honorary doctorate in recognition of his vision of unity, justice and peace.

Rev. Dr Olav Fykse Tveit has accepted an invitation from the Global Partnership to End Violence Against Children to serve on the organization's board of directors.

Tveit also serves as a co-president of Religions for Peace.

== Publications ==
- "Ein forsona Gud?" in Ung Teologi 3/88, p. 31-47 (A reconciling God?)
- Fleire artiklar in: Rolf Tofte (ed): Snart enige? Glimt fra samtaler mellom ulike kirkesamfunn. Oslo 1992
- Ole Chr Kvarme/Olav Fykse Tveit (ed): Evangeliet i vår kultur. Oslo 1995 (The Gospel in our Culture)
- "Den offisielle handsaminga av Porvoo-dokumentet i Den norske kyrkja" in Tidsskrift for Teologi og Kirke 66, 2/1995 p. 129-146 (The official summary of the Porvoo document in the Church of Norway)
- "Du ska’ få en dag i mårå". Rettferdiggjering av tru – kva tyder dette sentrale lærepunktet for oss i vår tid? (foredrag Hamar bispedømme), in Luthersk kirketidende 133 21/1998, p. 552-561.
- "Eine Kirche von Norwegen, aber nicht von Europa?", in H.J:Luibl/C.R. Müller/H.Zeddies: Unterwegs nach Europa. Perspektiven Evangelischen Kirchen, p. 62-68, Frankfurt am Main 2001 (A Church of Norway, but not of Europe?)
- Mutual Accountability as Ecumenical Attitude. A Study in Ecumenical Ecclesiology Based on Faith and Order Texts 1948-1998 (thesis.), Oslo 2001
- "Who defines who we are?" in Tidsskrift for teologi og kirke 73, 3/2002, p. 233-240
- "Same kyrkje – ny haldning? Om gjensidig ansvar som premiss for ei ny ordning for Den norske kyrkja." in Kirke og Kultur 107, 4/2002 p. 323-337
- "John 17 and the Unity of Believers. A Prayer for Unity through Relations" in Tidsskrift for teologi og kirke 74, 1/2003, p. 3-20
- "Ecumenical Attitudes as Criteria for Ecumenical Relations" in Ínternational Journal for the Study of the Church 4, 2/2004 p. 157-171
- Ei vedkjennande kyrkje. Hovudforedrag på Kyrkjemøtet 2004, Oslo 2004
- "Homofilisaka i ei økumenisk og open folkekyrkje" in Kirke og kultur 111. 3/2006, p. 369-378 (Homophilia in an ecumenical and open people's church)
- "Rom for Den Andre" (lecture for the semester opening of the Norwegian School of Theology) in Luthersk kirketidende 4/2007, p. 108-113 (Room for the others)
- "Er konsensus mogeleg i homofilisaka?" in Ung Teologi 4/2007, p. 5-23 (Is a consensus possible regarding homosexuality?)
- Christian Solidarity in the Cross of Christ (WCC Publications, 2012)
- The Truth We Owe Each Other: Mutual Accountability in the Ecumenical Movement (WCC Publications, 2016)
