= Helga Haugland Byfuglien =

Norwegian bishop

The Most Reverend Helga Haugland Byfuglien
- Primate of the Church of Norway
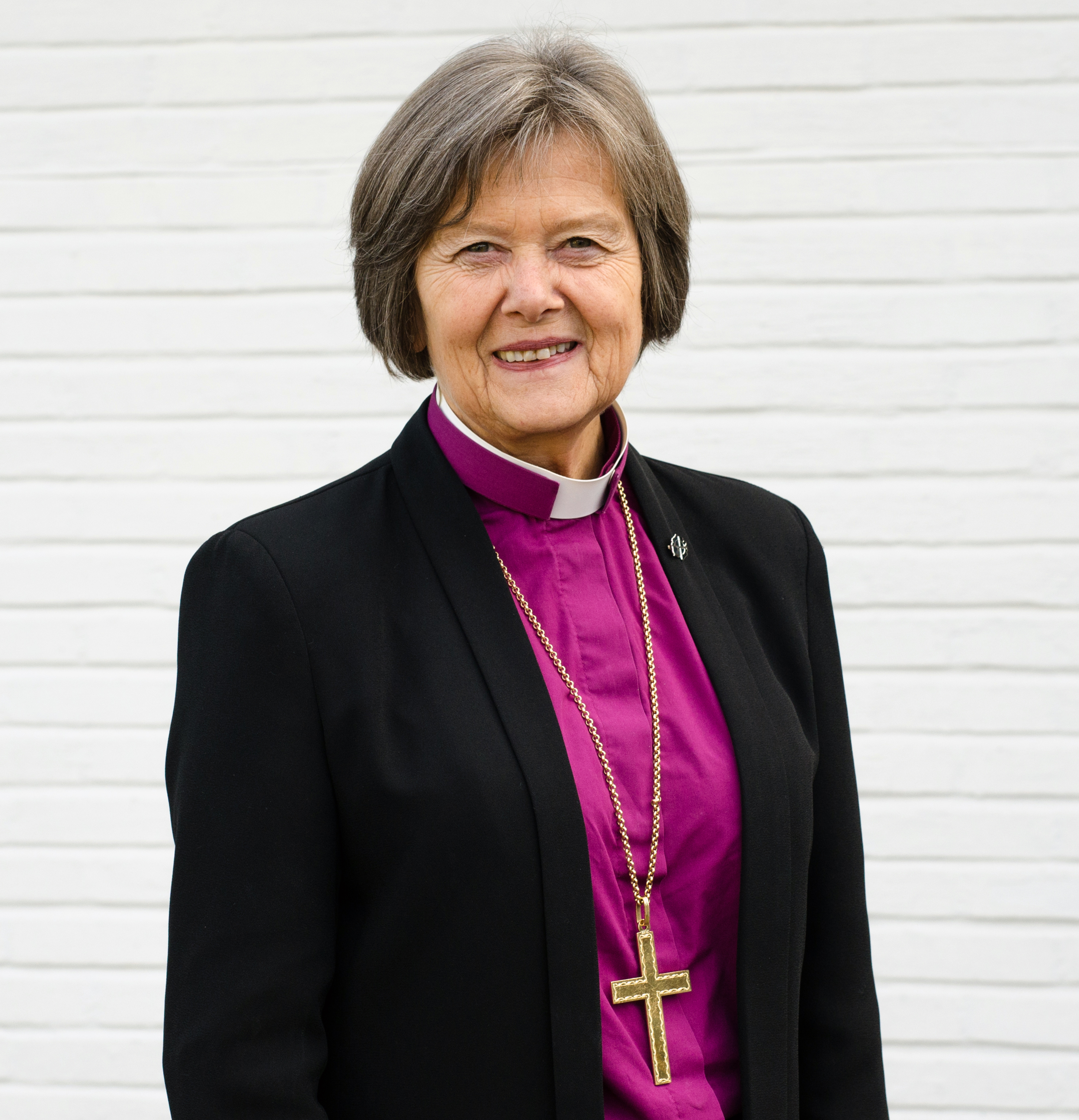
- Church: Church of Norway
- Elected: 21 October 2010 (as elected Preses); 2012 (as permanent Preses)
- Retired: January 2020
- Predecessor: Olav Skjevesland
- Successor: Olav Fykse Tveit
- Previous post: Bishop of Borg (2005–2012)

Orders
- Consecration: 11 December 2005 by Finn Wagle

Personal details
- Born: 22 June 1950 (age 76) Bergen, Norway
- Denomination: Lutheran

Helga Haugland Byfuglien (born 22 June 1950 in Bergen) is a bishop in the Church of Norway. She was the Preses of the Norwegian Bishops' Conference from 2010 until her retirement in 2020. Prior to that, she was the Bishop of the Diocese of Borg.

She was appointed on 23 September 2005 by King Harald V, and was consecrated and installed in office on 11 December 2005 at Fredrikstad Cathedral. She held the position as Secretary General of the Norwegian YMCA-YWCA. She was the parish priest in Nidaros Diocese from 1978 to 1986 and in Ås parish in the Borg Diocese from 1986 to 1993. From 1993 till 1997 she was chaplain in the Borg Diocese.

When Byfuglien retired as a bishop, she was appointed Commander of the Order of St. Olav for "her outstanding community service".

She was married to Tore Byfuglien (1950–2026), who also was a priest and theologian.

Church of Norway titles
Preceded by Olav Skjevesland	Preses of the Church of Norway; 2010–2020	Succeeded by Olav Fykse Tveit
Preceded by Ole Christian Kvarme	Bishop of Borg; 2005–2011	Succeeded by Atle Sommerfeldt
