= Finn Wagle =

Norwegian Christian bishop (1941–2026)

The Right Reverend Finn Wagle
- Bishop Emeritus of Nidaros; Former Primate of the Church of Norway
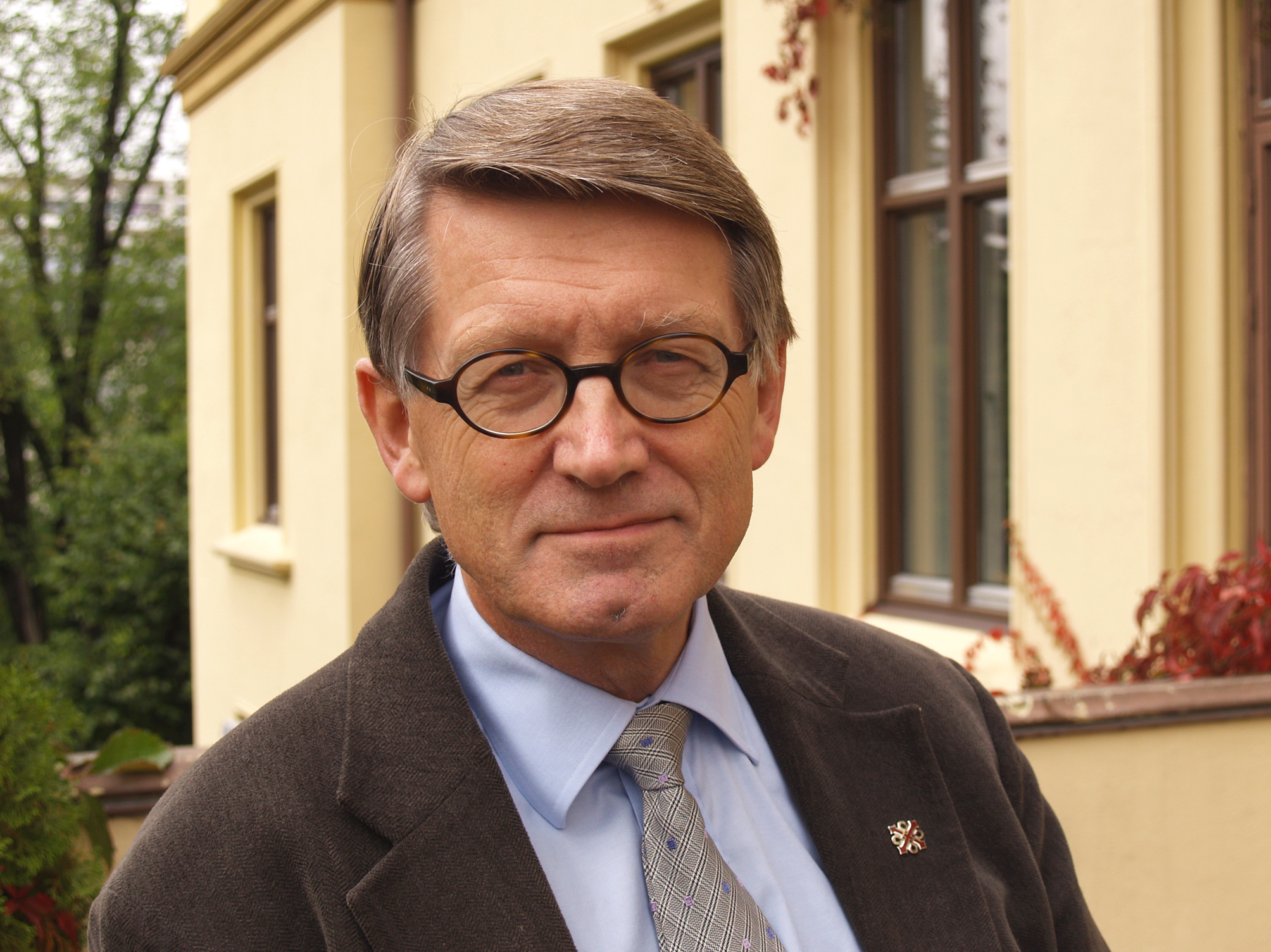
- Church: Church of Norway
- In office: 1991–2008
- Predecessor: Kristen Kyrre Bremer
- Successor: Tor Singsaas

Orders
- Consecration: 28 April 1991 by Andreas Aarflot

Personal details
- Born: 19 June 1941 Oslo, German-occupied Norway
- Died: 2 May 2026 (aged 84)
- Denomination: Lutheran
- Occupation: Bishop
- Education: cand.theol. (1968)
- Alma mater: MF Norwegian School of Theology

Finn Wagle (19 June 1941 – 2 May 2026) was a Norwegian theologian and a bishop of Nidaros in the Church of Norway. He was also the Preses (Primus inter pares, “first among equals”) and thus presided over the Bishop's Conference in the Church of Norway from 2002 until 2006.

== Biography ==
Wagle enrolled as a student at MF Norwegian School of Theology in 1962, and graduated in 1968 with the cand.theol. degree. The following year he graduated from the Practical Theological Seminary at MF. He also studied in 1966–1967 in Berlin with a Willy Brandt Scholarship.

His first post was serving as an army chaplain (1970) before working as a vicar for the parish of Sørreisa in the Diocese of Nord-Hålogaland from 1970 to 1975. From 1975 until 1981, he worked as an assistant professor at the Practical Theological Seminary at MF Norwegian School of Theology, while at the same time working for the Association of Ministers in the Church of Norway. From 1981 to 1988 he worked as director of the institute Church Educational Center (IKO), and in 1988 he became the Dean of the Nidaros Cathedral.

In 1991, Wagle became the bishop of the Diocese of Nidaros and was succeeded by Tor Singsaas upon his retirement in July 2008. In 2002, the Bishop's Conference of the Church of Norway elected him to be Preses, a position he held until 2006. He retired in 2008 for health reasons.

On 23 June 1991, Wagle was part of the consecration ceremony at the Nidaros Cathedral for the new king, Harald V. He also led the wedding ceremony at the Nidaros Cathedral for the king's daughter Princess Märtha Louise and Ari Behn on 24 May 2002.

Wagle died on 2 May 2026, at the age of 84.

Church of Norway titles
Preceded by Kristen Kyrre Bremer	Bishop of Nidaros; 1991–2008	Succeeded by Tor Singsaas
Preceded by Odd Bondevik	Preses of the Church of Norway; 2002–2006	Succeeded by Olav Skjevesland
