= Blossom Champlain =

Norwegian researcher

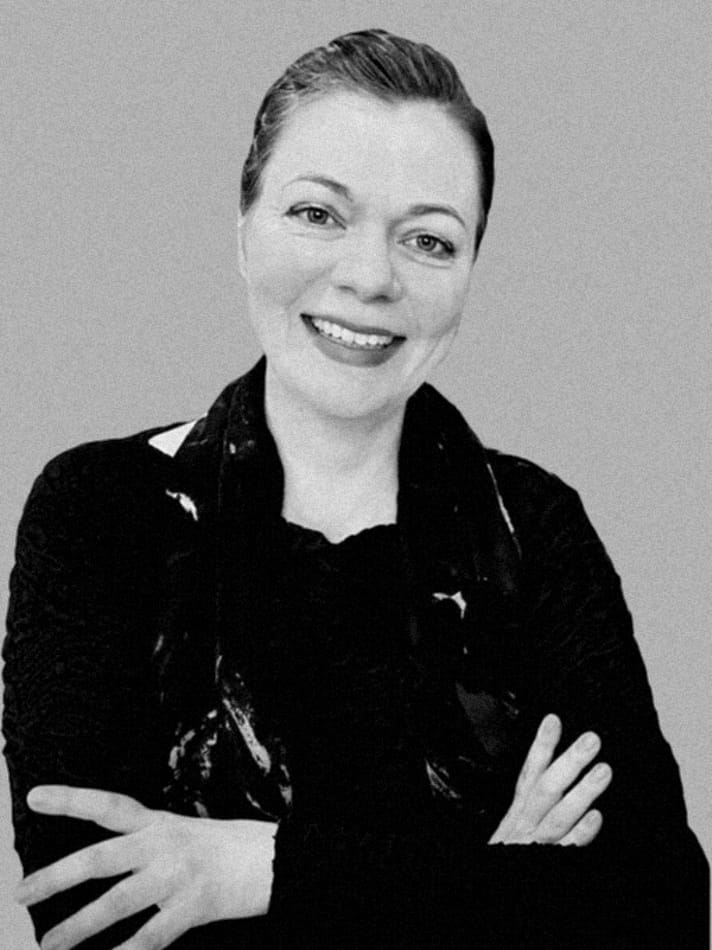
Professor Blossom Champlain

Blossom Champlain (born Stefaniw) is Professor of Intellectual History of Christianity at the MF Norwegian School of Theology, Religion and Society, in Oslo, Norway. Her research and writing focuses on how ancient and modern regimes of reading interact with the production of gendered and racial hierarchies.

== Education ==
Champlain was awarded her PhD from the University of Erfurt in 2008, where she studied with Professor Jörg Rüpke. Her doctoral thesis was Mind, Text, and Commentary: Noetic Exegesis in Origen Alexandria, Didymus the Blind, and Evagrius Ponticus. It was published as a monograph in 2010.

== Career and research ==
Champlain is an expert on late antique religion, asceticism, feminist historiography, masculinity, and epistemic justice. Before coming to MF, held postdoctoral positions at the University of Erfurt, Dumbarton Oaks, and Aarhus University. She was then a Heisenberg Fellow of the German Research Council and Junior Professor for Ethics in Antiquity and Christianity at the Johannes Gutenberg University Mainz from 2011.

== Bibliography ==
- Stefaniw, Blossom (2021). "Masculinity, Historiography, and Uses of the Past: An Introduction". Journal of Early Christian History. 11 (1): 1–14. doi:10.1080/2222582X.2021.1931903. hdl:11250/3052362.
- Stefaniw, Blossom (September 2020). "Feminist Historiography and Uses of the Past". Studies in Late Antiquity. 4 (3): 260–283. doi:10.1525/sla.2020.4.3.260.
- Christian Reading: Language, Ethics, and the Order of Things (Oakland: University of California Press, 2019)
