= Tor Singsaas =

Norwegian Lutheran minister

The Right Reverend Tor Singsaas
- Bishop Emeritus of Nidaros
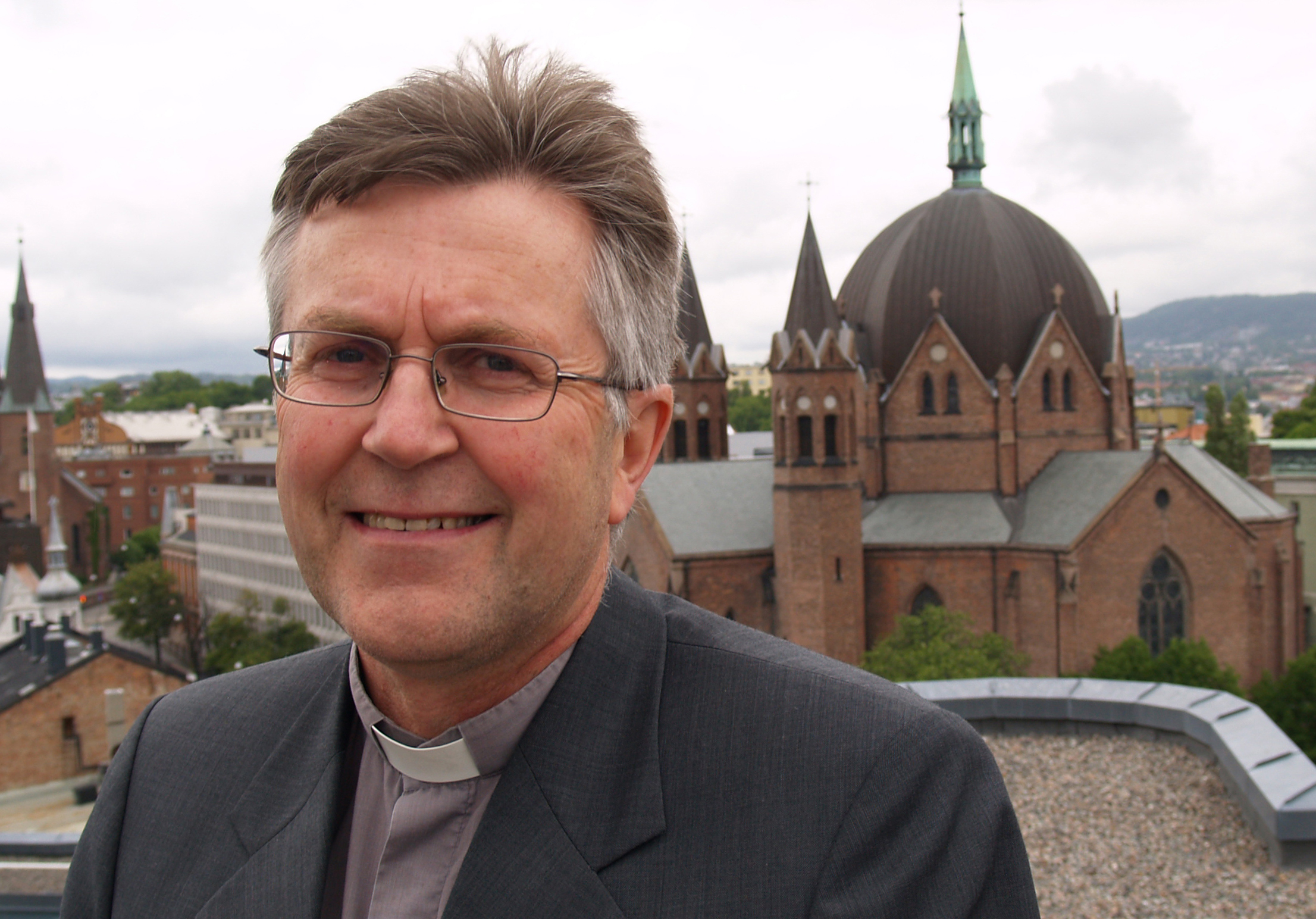
- Tor Singsaas
- Church: Church of Norway
- In office: 2008–2017
- Predecessor: Finn Wagle
- Successor: Herborg Finnset

Personal details
- Born: 1 February 1948 (age 78) Hølonda Municipality, Norway
- Denomination: Christian
- Education: cand.theol. (1977)
- Alma mater: MF Norwegian School of Theology

Tor Singsaas (born 1 February 1948) is a Norwegian Lutheran minister and the former bishop in the Diocese of Nidaros.

== Background ==
Singsaas was born and baptized in Hølonda Municipality, Norway and grew up in Buvika and Melhus. His father was a general store manager, and Singsaas grew up in and around these stores, which were typically where people in the local community gathered on a daily basis. He briefly considered becoming an actor, but settled on a career within theology.

== Education ==
Singsaas earned his degree in theology at MF Norwegian School of Theology in Oslo in 1976 (theology) and 1977 (practical theology). He was ordained as a minister in Melhus Church on 8 January 1978, with Bishop Tord Godal officiating. He has also completed coursework in pastoral duties, family counseling, church history, and other topics.

== Appointments ==
Singsaas started his career in 1978 as a substitute minister at Høybråten Church in Oslo, but the same year he was assigned to the permanent position of chaplain for the Diocese of Nidaros, a job he held until 1991. From 1991 until 2004, he was the resident chaplain at the Nidaros Cathedral. From 2004 until 2008, he was the Dean of the Byåsen prosti (deanery) in Trondheim Municipality. In 2008, the bishop of Nidaros, Finn Wagle retired and Singsaas was one of several nominees for that seat, and was consistently favored to win the appointment. He was appointed Bishop of the Diocese of Nidaros by the Norwegian Council of State on 27 June 2008. He was consecrated as Bishop on 14 December 2008.

Religious titles
Preceded by Finn Wagle	Bishop of Nidaros; 2008–2017	Succeeded by Herborg Finnset
