= Bernt Oftestad =

Norwegian historian (born 1942)

Bernt Torvild Oftestad (born 18 February 1942) is a Norwegian historian.

Oftestad graduated from the MF Norwegian School of Theology in 1968 with the degree cand.theol., and in 1979 with the degree dr.theol. His doctoral work was on the Norwegian author Ronald Fangen. He became a professor of church history at the MF Norwegian School of Theology in 1983 and in European cultural history in 2005.

Oftestad has published books and articles within the fields of historiography, Reformation history and the Modern Era. He has also written on the Norwegian author and Nobel laureate Sigrid Undset.

He converted to Roman Catholicism in 2000.

== Bibliography ==
- Historie, tro og forståelse (History, Faith and Understanding, 1973)
- Kristentro og kulturansvar hos Ronald Fangen (Christian Faith and Cultural Responsibility in the Authorship of Ronald Fangen, 1981)
- Lære, Tro og Fornuft. Kirkene i nytiden (Doctrine, Faith and Reason. The Church in the Age of Modernity, 1988)
- Den norske statsreligionen. Fra øvrighetskirke til demokratisk statskirke (The Norwegian Religion of State, 1998)
- Tro og politikk. En reformasjonshistorie (Faith and Politics. A History of the Reformation Period, 2001)
- Sigrid Undset. Modernitet og katolisisme (Sigrid Undset. Modernity and Catholicism, 2003)
- Den katolske kirken og det liberale demokratiet (The Catholic Church and Liberal Democracy, 2018)

With other Authors

- Norsk kirkehistorie (Introduction to Norwegian Church History, 1991/2005) (with Tarald Rasmussen and Jan Schumacher)
- Quo vaditis: the state churches of Northern Europe (1996)
- Tro: 13 essays om tro (Faith: 13 Essay on Faith, 2006)
