= Preses (Church of Norway) =

Leader of the Bishop's Conference

The Preses of the Church of Norway is a titular bishop who leads the Bishops' Conference of the church as one who is primus inter pares (Latin for "first among equals"). The name comes from the Latin word praeses which means "placed before" or "at the head". In 2011, the office of Preses was changed by law to be a 12th permanent bishopric within the Church of Norway. Prior to 2011, it was an elected position from within the 11 diocesan bishops that made up the Bishops' Conference of the Church of Norway.

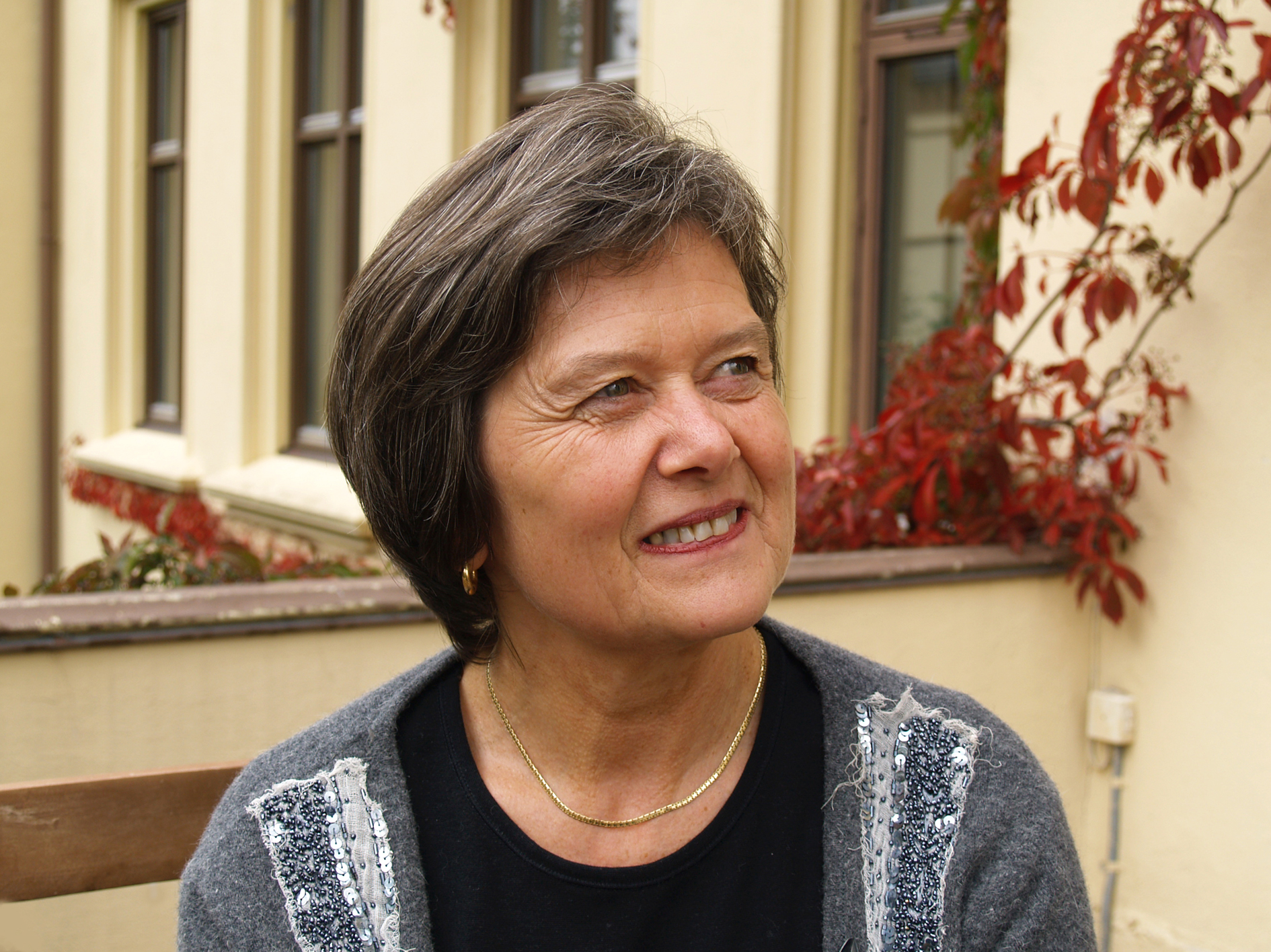
Former Preses of the Bishops' Conference, Helga Haugland Byfuglien

The first permanent preses was Helga Haugland Byfuglien who was appointed to the position on 25 March 2011 by the Cabinet of Norway, and she officially took over on 2 October 2011 at the next meeting of the Bishops' Conference. She retired in 2020 and was replaced by Olav Fykse Tveit. The Preses is a bishop and is the only one who does not oversee a diocese. Rather, this bishopric primarily oversees the work of the Bishops' Conference and the duties assigned to it by the conference. The preses is based at Nidaros Cathedral in Trondheim, along with the bishop of the Diocese of Nidaros. The preses is also the dean of the Nidaros domprosti (deanery) in central Trondheim.

== History ==
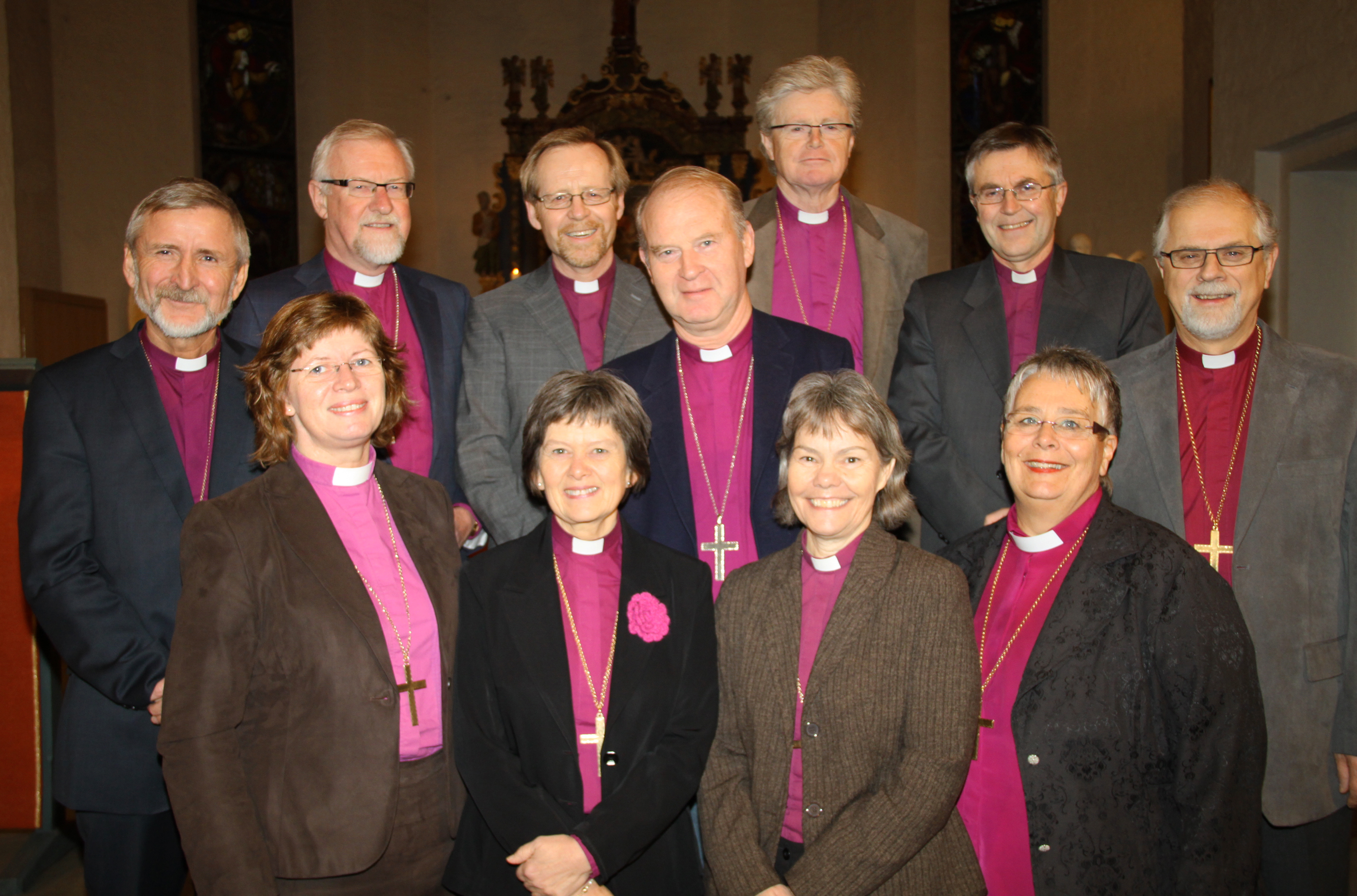
View of the bishops in the Bishops' Conference in 2009

Preses of the Bishops' Conference (Norwegian: Preses i Bispemøtet) was the official title of the elected leader of the Bishops' Conference since 1932. Before that time, the name was unofficially used along with "chairman" of the conference. Since 2011, the title is no longer elected, but a permanent bishopric.

The Church of Norway separated from the Church of Denmark in 1814 when the union with Denmark ended. The bishops of the Church of Norway met together rarely, with only minutes from 1877 and 1915 surviving. The bishop of the Diocese of Kristiania served as the chairman of both meetings. This was a reflection of the fact that the royal court order of precedence from 1817 until the 1920s ranked the bishop of Kristiania (Oslo) firmly in front of the other bishops. In 1934, the Bishops' conference was formalized by the Reglement for bispemøtene law that was adopted by Johan Ludwig Mowinckel's 3rd government such that the bishop of Oslo was elected by the bishops as the preses for each meeting.

In 1984, the rules were adjusted so that the preses was not elected for each individual meeting session, but rather they were elected for one year at a time. In 1998 the bishop of Oslo, Andreas Aarflot, resigned as bishop (and preses) and the other bishops decided that the rules should be changed and that the elections for preses should be every four years rather than annually and that it would not have to be the bishop of Oslo. Odd Bondevik, the bishop of the Diocese of Møre, was elected, the first time a non-Oslo bishop was elected. In 2011, the government of Norway changed the law to create a permanent preses. The first permanent preses was Helga Haugland Byfuglien.

On 17 October 2019, Olav Fykse Tveit, the current general secretary of the World Council of Churches, was nominated to be the next preses. He took office in 2020.

=== List of elected preses ===
- 1877: Carl Peter Parelius Essendrop, chairman because he was the highest ranking bishop (Oslo)
- 1915: Jens Frølich Tandberg, chairman because he was the highest ranking bishop (Oslo)
- 1917–1922: Jens Frølich Tandberg, elected by bishops for each meeting
- 1922–1937: Johan Lunde, elected by bishops for each meeting
- 1937–1951: Eivind Berggrav, elected by bishops for each meeting
- 1951–1968: Johannes Smemo, elected by bishops for each meeting
- 1968–1972: Fridtjov Birkeli, elected by bishops for each meeting
- 1973–1977: Kaare Støylen, elected by bishops for each meeting
- 1977–1998: Andreas Aarflot, elected by bishops for each meeting (1977–1984); elected by the bishops annually (1984–1998)
- 1998–2002: Odd Bondevik, elected by the bishops for four years
- 2002–2006: Finn Wagle, elected by the bishops for four years
- 2006–2010: Olav Skjevesland, elected by the bishops for four years
- 2010–2011: Helga Haugland Byfuglien, elected by the bishops until the new permanent Preses was in place

=== List of permanent preses ===
- 2011–2020: Helga Haugland Byfuglien
- 2020-present: Olav Fykse Tveit
