= Andreas Aarflot =

20th-century Norwegian bishop

The Right Reverend Andreas Aarflot
- Bishop Emeritus of Oslo; Former Primate of the Church of Norway→
- Church: Church of Norway
- In office: 1977–1998
- Predecessor: Kaare Støylen
- Successor: Gunnar Stålsett

Personal details
- Born: 1 July 1928 (age 97) Yiyang, Hunan, Republic of China

Andreas Aarflot (born 1 July 1928) is a Norwegian theologian and bishop emeritus in the Church of Norway. He was bishop of Oslo from 1977 to 1998.

== Early life ==
Aarflot was born in Yiyang, China where his mother and father served the Norwegian Missionary Society in the Hunan province. Aarflot earned his cand.theol. from MF Norwegian School of Theology (1951) and dr.theol. from University of Oslo (1970). Furthermore, he has studied in Heidelberg, England and the United States, has an honorary doctor's degree from St. Olaf College (1987) and is an honorary member of Finska kyrkohistoriska sälllskapet (1978).

Aarflot has among other things worked for the Norwegian Seamen's Mission and the Norwegian Lutheran Inner Mission Society, and served as a pastor in Røyken. He was connected with the MF Norwegian School of Theology (1960), faculty lecturer (1968) and docent (1970) before he became a professor in 1976. The same year he was proclaimed bishop in the Diocese of Borg after Per Lønning withdrew as a protest on legalizing abortion. Aarflot was decorated as a Commander with Star of the Order of St. Olav in 1979.

Church of Norway titles
Preceded by Per Lønning	Bishop of Borg; 1976–1978	Succeeded by Gunnar Lislerud
Preceded by Kaare Støylen	Bishop of Oslo; 1978–1998	Succeeded by Gunnar Stålsett
Preceded by Kaare Støylen	Preses of the Church of Norway; 1978–1998	Succeeded by Odd Bondevik
