= Odd Bondevik =

Norwegian theologian

The Right Reverend Odd Bondevik
- Bishop of Møre; Primate of the Church of Norway
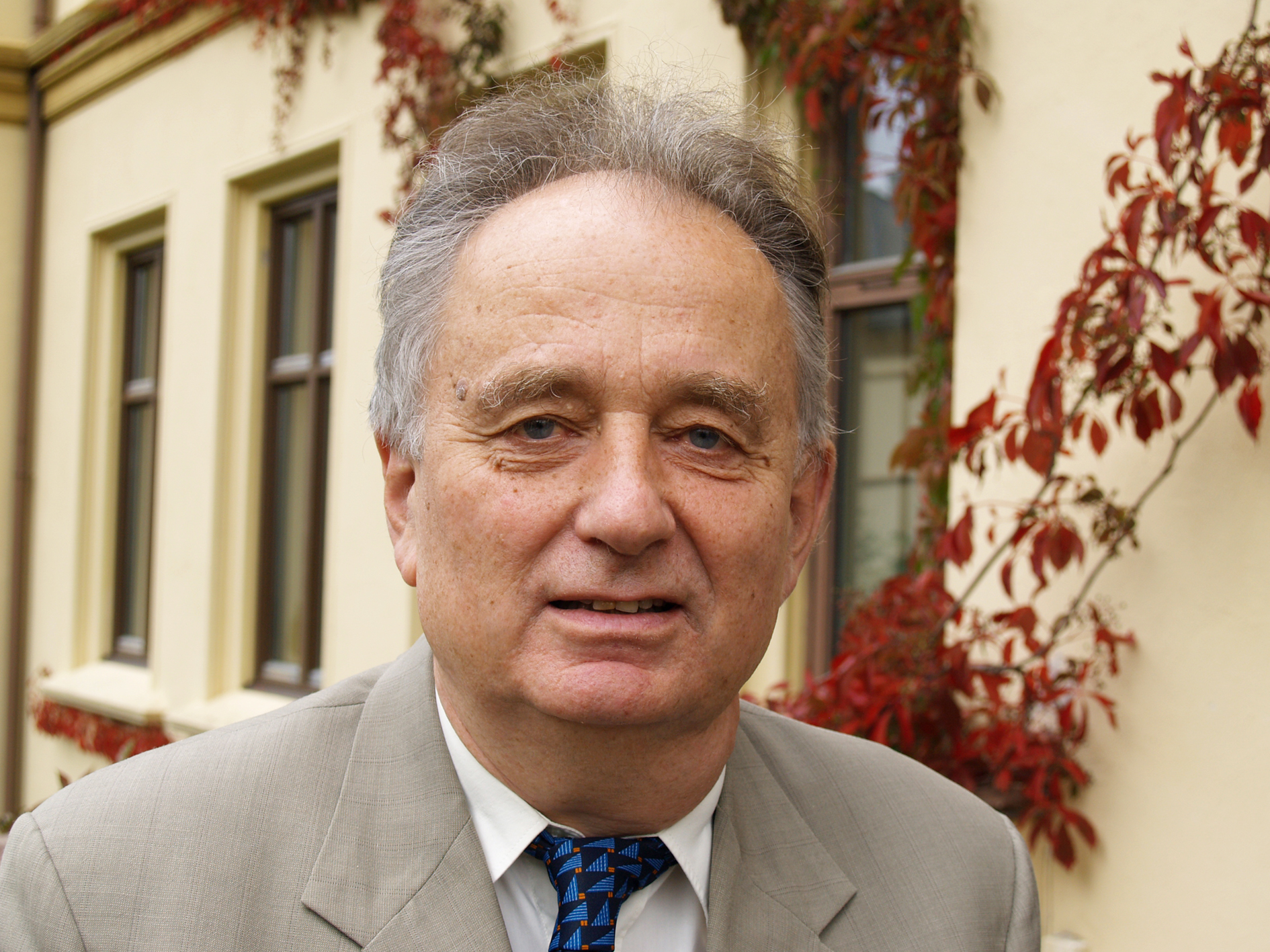
- Photo by Kirkens Informasjonstjeneste
- Church: Church of Norway
- Diocese: Diocese of Møre
- Appointed: 1991
- In office: 1991–2008

Personal details
- Born: 20 June 1941 Sauda,Reichskommissariat Norwegen (today Norway)
- Died: 6 September 2014 (aged 73) Drammen, Norway
- Denomination: Christian
- Occupation: Priest
- Education: MF Norwegian School of Theology, Cand.theol. (1965)

Odd Bondevik (20 June 1941 – 6 September 2014) was a Norwegian theologian who was the Bishop of the Diocese of Møre in the Church of Norway from 17 November 1991 until retirement in 2008. He also served as Preses of the Bishop's Conference of the Church of Norway from 1998 until 2002.

== Career ==
Bondevik was born in Sauda, Norway on 20 June 1941. His family moved to Oslo when he was 8 years old since his father, Kjell Bondevik had been elected to the Parliament of Norway for the Christian Democratic Party. Odd Bondevik attended the MF Norwegian School of Theology and graduated in 1965 with a Cand.theol. degree. From 1969–1978, he worked as a missionary to Japan for the Norwegian Missionary Society. From 1978 he worked at the home office of the Norwegian Missionary Society as a secretary for mission. In 1980 he became the General Secretary of the Society, a position a held until he was consecrated bishop in 1991.

Bondevik was consecrated as Bishop on 17 November 1991. He was elected Preses (President) of the Bishop's Conference for the Church of Norway from 1998 until 2002. In August 2007, he announced his intention to retire and he had his last church service on 10 February 2008 at Molde Cathedral.

In retirement, he put together a new Norwegian translation of the Old Testament. He was noted for proposing that the word "hell" be edited out of the Bible.

He was generally considered to hold conservative theological views.

== Personal life ==
Bondevik's father was the politician and member of parliament Kjell Bondevik and he is a cousin of Kjell Magne Bondevik, the former Prime Minister of Norway. He got married in 2012 to Wenche Yamamoto.

He died on 6 September 2014.

Religious titles
| Preceded by Ole Nordhaug | Bishop of Møre; 1991–2008 | Succeeded by Ingeborg Midttømme |
| Preceded by Andreas Aarflot | Preses of the Church of Norway; 1998–2002 | Succeeded by Finn Wagle |
