= Church of Norway =

Evangelical-Lutheran denomination in Norway

Church of Norway
- Den norske kirke
- Classification: Christian
- Orientation: Lutheran (Note: The Church of Norway is a broad church encompassing a range of liturgical and theological expressions, including High Church, Low Church, Liberal, and Folk Church traditions.)
- Scripture: Protestant Bible
- Theology: Lutheran theology (Note: With various theological and doctrinal identities, including High Church, Liberal, and Folk Church traditions.)
- Polity: Episcopal
- Preses: Olav Fykse Tveit of Nidaros
- Associations: Lutheran World Federation; World Council of Churches; Conference of European Churches; Communion of Protestant Churches in Europe; Porvoo Communion
- Region: Norway
- Origin: 934 (Introduction of Christianity); 1537 (Lutheran Reformation)
- Separated from: Catholic Church
- Separations: Nordic Catholic Church (1999); Evangelical Lutheran Diocese of Norway (2013)
- Members: 3,427,657 (2025)
- Official website: kirken.no

The Church of Norway (Bokmål: Den norske kirke, Nynorsk: Den norske kyrkja, Northern Sami: Norgga girku, Southern Sami: Nöörjen gærhkoe) is an evangelical Lutheran denomination of Protestant Christianity and the largest Christian church in Norway.

Christianity became the state religion of Norway around 1020, and was established as a separate church intimately integrated with the state as a result of the Lutheran reformation in Denmark–Norway which broke ties with the Holy See in 1536–1537; the Norwegian monarch was the church's titular head from 1537 to 2012. Historically, the church was one of the main instruments of state authority, and an important part of the state's administration. Local government was based on the church's parishes with significant official responsibility held by the parish priest.

In the 19th and 20th centuries, the Church of Norway gradually ceded most administrative functions to the secular civil service. The modern Constitution of Norway describes the church as the country's "people's church" and requires the monarch to be a member. It is by far the largest church in Norway; until the mid 19th century the state church had a near-total monopoly on religion in Norway. It was the only legal church in Norway, membership was mandatory for every person residing in the kingdom and it was forbidden for anyone other than the official priests of the state church to authorise religious meetings. After the adoption of the 1845 Dissenter Act, the state church retained its legally privileged position, while minority religious congregations such as Catholics were allowed to establish themselves in Norway and were legally termed "dissenters" (i.e. from the government-sanctioned Lutheran state religion). Church employees were civil servants from the Reformation until 2017, when the church became a legal entity separate from the state administration. The Church of Norway is mentioned specifically in the 1814 constitution and is subject to the Church Act. Municipalities are required by law to support activities of parishes and to maintain church buildings and churchyards. Other religious communities are entitled to the same level of government subsidies as the Church of Norway.

The church is led by ordained deacons, priests and bishops. Deacons focus on serving those in need and assist the priests. Priests are traditionally and primarily divided into the ranks chaplain, parish priest (sogneprest) who was traditionally the head of a parish (prestegjeld; literally area that owes allegiance to a priest), and provost (prost). Bishops are elected and consecrated from the priesthood and are the leaders of dioceses. Today, most priests may hold the title of parish priest, while some priests who work directly under a provost are known as provostship priest (prostiprest). All priests and bishops were appointed by the King-in-Council until the late 20th century and thus held the status of embetsmann (higher civil servant appointed by the King). Prior to 2000, ordination required the theological civil servant examination (cand.theol.) that required six years of university studies, but from 2000 other equivalent degrees may also be accepted for certain applicants over the age of 35 with relevant experience.

== Overview ==
Norway was gradually Christianized beginning at the end of the Early Middle Ages and was part of Western Christianity, acknowledging papal authority until the 16th century. The Catholic Church exercised a significant degree of sovereignty in Norway and essentially shared power with the King of Norway as the secular ruler. The Lutheran reformation in Denmark–Norway in 1536–1537 broke ties with the Holy See, around two decades after the start of the Protestant Reformation. It later resulted in the separation of dioceses in Norway and throughout the Nordic countries from the Catholic Church. These Lutheran state churches were integrated with the state and subject to royal authority. The Norwegian monarch, although a layperson, was deemed the head of the church until 2012, although in practice the bishops remained the spiritual leaders. Until the modern era, the Church of Norway was not only a religious organisation but also one of the most important instruments of state authority, and an important part of the state administration, especially at the local and regional levels.

The church professes to be "truly Catholic, truly Reformed, truly Evangelical" in the Evangelical Lutheran tradition of Western Christian faith, with its foundation on the Bible's Old and New Testaments and occasionally including the Apocrapha, along with the three historic creeds of faith in the Apostles', Nicene, and Athanasian Creeds, Luther's Small Catechism, Luther's Large Catechism, the Smalcald Articles and the Augsburg Confession of 1530, along with several other seminal documents in the Book of Concord: Confessions of the Evangelical Lutheran Church published in 1580. All Evangelical Lutheran clergy (bishops, priests/pastors, deacons and other ministers) are required to read and assent to the Book of Concord. The church is a member of Communion of Protestant Churches in Europe, having signed the Leuenberg Agreement with other Lutheran and Reformed churches in 1973. It is also a member of the Porvoo Communion with 12 other churches, among them, the Anglican churches of Europe. It has also signed other ecumenical texts, including the Joint Declaration on the Doctrine of Justification with the Catholic Church and the Joint Declaration of Pope Francis and Bishop Munib Younan in the city of Lund, Sweden, in 2016.

As of 2017 the church is legally independent of the government. According to the constitution it serves as the "people's church" in the Kingdom of Norway. Until 1969, the church's name for administrative purposes was simply the "State Church" or sometimes just "the Church", whereas the constitution described it as the "Evangelical-Lutheran Church". A constitutional amendment of 21 May 2012 designates the church as "Norway's people's church" (Norges Folkekirke), with a new provision that is almost a verbatim copy of the provision for the Danish state church (folkekirken) in the Constitution of Denmark; the Minister of Church Affairs Trond Giske stressed that the reform meant that "the state church is retained", On 27 May 2016 Stortinget (Parliament of Norway) approved a new legislative act to establish the Church of Norway as an independent legal entity rather than a branch of the civil service, and the law took effect on 1 January 2017. The church remains state funded.

== Organization ==
Dioceses of the Church of Norway

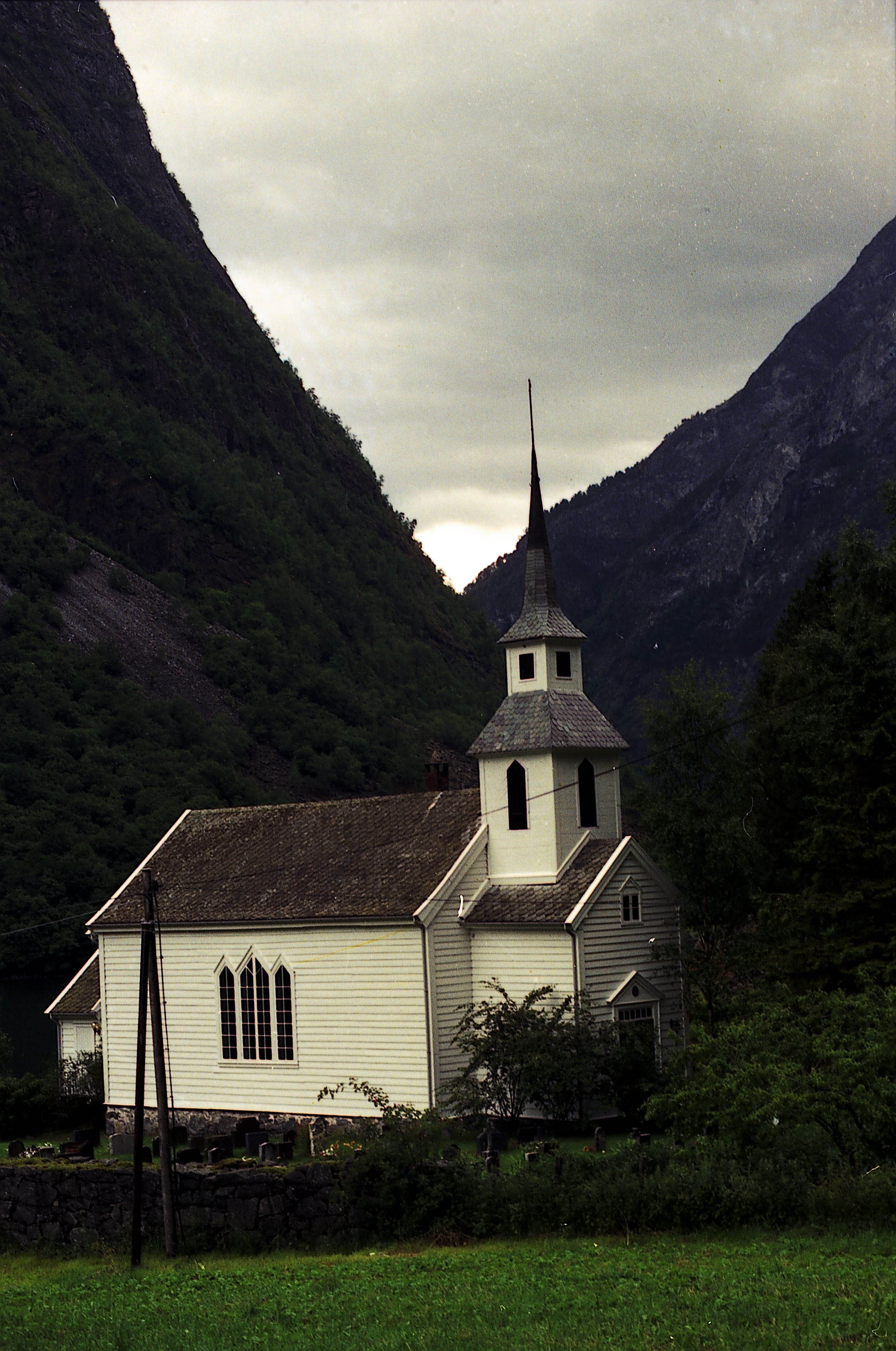
Bakka kyrkje in Aurland, Sogn, Norway

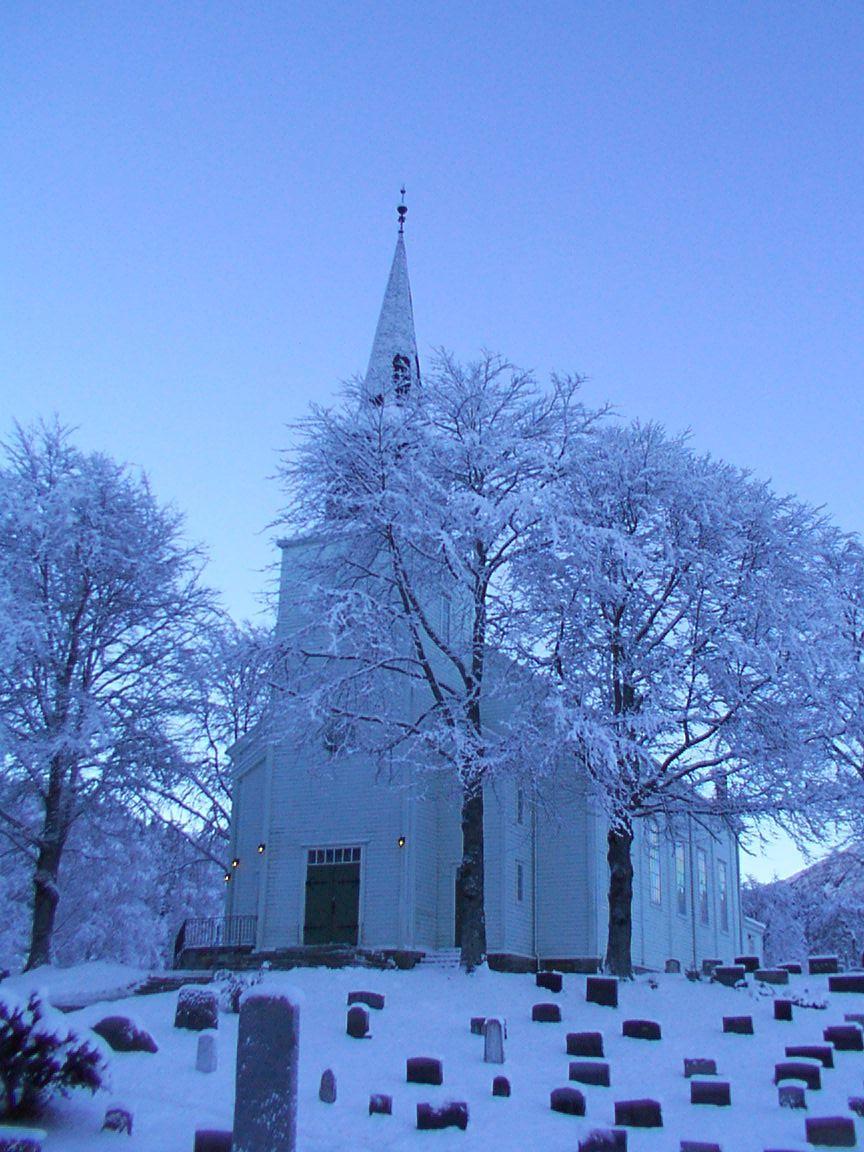
Førde kyrkje, Førde, Norway

=== State and church ===
Until 1845 the Church of Norway was the only legal religious organization in Norway and it was not possible for a person to end membership in the Church of Norway. The Dissenter Act (Lov angaaende dem, der bekjende sig til den christelige Religion, uden at være medlemmer af Statskirken) was approved by the Storting on 16 July 1845 to allow the establishment of alternative religious (Christian) bodies. This act was replaced in 1969 by Lov om trudomssamfunn og ymist anna.

Until 2012, the constitutional head of the church was the King of Norway, who is still obliged to profess himself a Lutheran. After the constitutional amendment of 21 May 2012, the church is self-governed with regard to doctrinal issues and appointment of clergy.

The Church of Norway was subject to legislation, including its budgets, passed by the Storting, and its central administrative functions were carried out by the Royal Ministry of Government Administration, Reform and Church Affairs until 2017. Bishops and priests were civil servants also after the 2012 constitutional reform. Each parish has an autonomous administration. The state itself does not administer church buildings; buildings and adjacent land instead belong to the parish as an independent public institution. The Minister of Church Affairs, Trond Giske, was responsible for proposing the 2012 amendments, explaining that "the state church is retained".

An act approved in 2016 created the Church of Norway as an independent legal entity, effective from 1 January 2017.

=== Structure ===
The church has an episcopal-synodal structure, with 1,284 parishes, 106 deaneries, 11 dioceses and, since 2 October 2011, one area under the supervision of the Preses. The dioceses are, according to the rank of the five historic sees and then according to age:

No	Diocese	Founded Dissolved	Cathedral	Incumbent
I	Diocese of Nidaros	1068	Nidaros Cathedral	Bishop-Preses Olav Fykse Tveit (2020–present) (Preses of Norway); Bishop Herborg Finnset (2017–present) (Bishop of Nidaros)
II	Diocese of Bjørgvin	1068	Bergen Cathedral	Bishop Ragnhild Jepsen (2023–present)
III	Diocese of Oslo	1068	Oslo Cathedral	Bishop Sunniva Gylver (2025–present)
(IV)	Diocese of Stavanger	1112; 1682 (Moved to Kristiansand)	Stavanger Cathedral	n/a
(V)	Diocese of Hamar	1152; 1537 (united with Oslo)	Old Hamar Cathedral	n/a
IV	Diocese of Agder og Telemark	1682	Kristiansand Cathedral	Bishop-Vice Preses Stein Reinertsen (2012–present)
(X)	Diocese of Hålogaland	1804; 1952 (split into Nord- and Sør-Hålogaland)	1804: Alstahaug Church; 1864: Tromsø Cathedral	n/a
V	Diocese of Hamar	1864	Hamar Cathedral	Bishop Ole Kristian Bonden (2023–present)
VI	Diocese of Stavanger	1925	Stavanger Cathedral	Bishop Anne Lise Ådnøy (2019–present)
VII	Diocese of Tunsberg	1948	Tønsberg Cathedral	Bishop Jan Otto Myrseth (2018–present)
X	Diocese of Sør-Hålogaland	1952	Bodø Cathedral	Bishop Svein Valle (2023–present)
XI	Diocese of Nord-Hålogaland	1952	Tromsø Cathedral	Bishop Olav Øygard (2014–present)
VIII	Diocese of Borg	1969	Fredrikstad Cathedral	Bishop Kari Mangrud Alvsvåg (2022–present)
IX	Diocese of Møre	1983	Molde Cathedral	Bishop Ingeborg Midttømme (2008–present)

=== Governing bodies ===
The General Synod of the Church of Norway, which convenes once a year, is the highest representative body of the church. It consists of 85 representatives, of whom seven or eight are sent from each of the dioceses. Of these, four are lay members appointed by the congregations; one is a lay member appointed by church employees; one is a member appointed by the clergy; and the bishop. In addition, one representative from the Sami community in each of the three northernmost dioceses, representatives from the three theological seminaries, representatives from the youth council. Other members of the national council are also members of the general synod.

The national council, the executive body of the synod, is convened five times a year and comprises 15 members, of whom ten are lay members, four are clergy and one is the presiding bishop. It prepares matters for decision-making elsewhere and puts those decisions into effect. The council also has working and ad hoc groups, addressing issues such as church service, education and youth issues.

The Council on Ecumenical and International Relations deals with international and ecumenical matters, and the Sami Church Council is responsible for the Church of Norway's work among the country's indigenous Sami people.

The Bishops' Conference of the Church of Norway convenes three times a year, and consists of the twelve bishops in the church (the 11 diocesan bishops and the Preses). It issues opinions on various issues related to church life and theological matters.

The church also convenes committees and councils both at the national level (such as the Doctrinal Commission (Den norske kirkes lærenemnd), and at diocesan and local levels, addressing specific issues related to education, ecumenical matters, the Sami minority and youth.

There are 1,600 Church of Norway churches and chapels. Parish work is led by a priest and an elected parish council. There are more than 1,200 clergy (in 2007, 21% were women ministers) in the Church of Norway. The Church of Norway does not own church buildings, which are instead owned by the parish and maintained by the municipality.

== Worship ==
The focus of church life is the Sunday High Mass (høymesse) where the Eucharist is celebrated. The main service is most commonly celebrated at 11:00 a.m. The liturgy is similar to that in use in the Catholic Church. The language is entirely Norwegian, apart from the Kyrie Eleison, and the singing of hymns accompanied by organ music is central. A priest (often with lay assistants) celebrates the service, wearing an alb and stole. In addition, a chasuble is worn by the priest during the Eucharist and, increasingly, during the whole service.

The Church of Norway baptises children, usually infants, and usually as part of ordinary Sunday services.

This is a summary of the liturgy for High Mass:

- Praeludium
- Opening Hymn
- Greeting
- Confession of Sin
- Kyrie
- Gloria (This may be omitted during Lent)
- Collect of the Day

(If there is a baptism it together with the Apostles' Creed may take place here or after the Sermon)

- First Lesson (Old Testament, an Epistle, the Acts of the Apostles or the Revelation to John)
- Hymn of Praise
- Second Lesson (An Epistle, the Acts of the Apostles, the Revelation to John or a Gospel)
- Apostles' Creed
- Hymn before the Sermon
- Sermon (concluding with the Gloria Patri)
- Hymn after the Sermon
- Church Prayer (i.e., Intercessions)

(If there is no Communion, i.e., the Eucharist, the service concludes with the Lord's Prayer, an optional Offering, the Blessing and a moment of silent prayer)

- Hymn before the Communion
- Threefold Dialogue and Proper Preface
- Sanctus
- Prayer before the Lord's Supper,
- Lord's Prayer
- Words of Institution
- Agnus Dei
- Reception of Communion
- Prayer of Thanksgiving after Communion
- Blessing
- Silent Prayer (as the church bell is toned nine – 3×3 – times)
- Postludium

== History ==
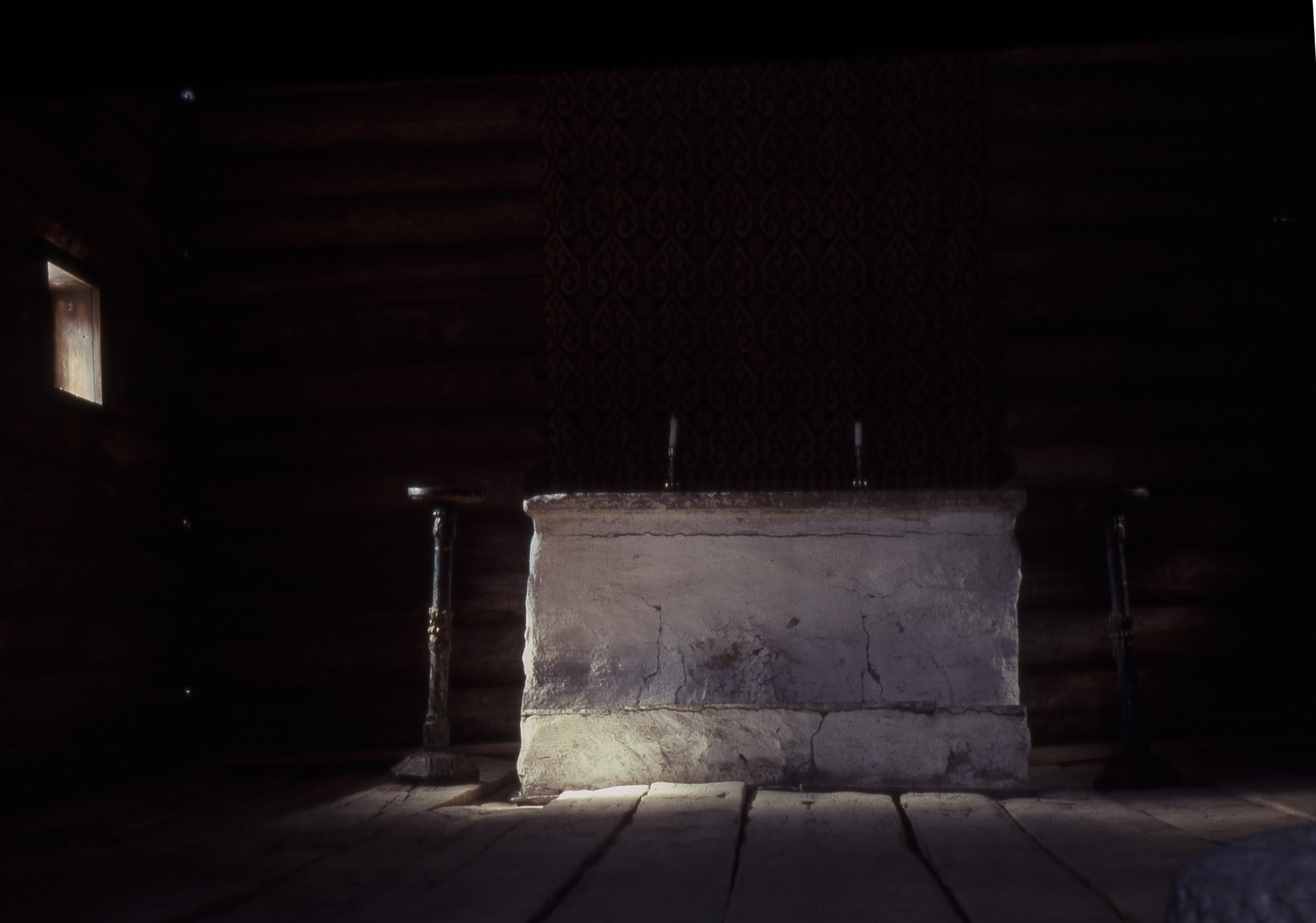
Old private altar in Hedmark, Norway

=== Origin ===
The Church of Norway traces its origins to the introduction of Christianity to Norway in the 9th century. Norway was Christianized as a result of missions from both the British Isles (by Haakon I of Norway and Olaf I of Norway), and from the Continent (by Ansgar). It took several hundred years to complete the Christianization, culminating on 29 July 1030 with the Battle of Stiklestad, when King Olaf II of Norway was killed. One year later, on 3 August 1031, he was canonised in Nidaros by Bishop Grimkell, and a few years later enshrined in Nidaros Cathedral. The cathedral with its shrine to St. Olav became the major Nordic place of pilgrimage until the Lutheran reformation in 1537. The whereabouts of Saint Olaf's grave have been unknown since 1568.

Saint Olaf is traditionally regarded as being responsible for the final conversion of Norway to Christianity, and is still seen as Norway's patron saint and "eternal king" (Rex Perpetuus Norvegiae). The Nordic churches were initially subordinate to the Archbishop of Bremen, until the Nordic Archdiocese of Lund was established in 1103. The separate Norwegian Archdiocese of Nidaros (in today's Trondheim) was created in 1152, and by the end of the 12th century covered all of Norway, parts of present Sweden, Iceland, Greenland, the Isle of Man, the Orkney Islands, the Shetland Islands, the Faroe Islands and the Hebrides.

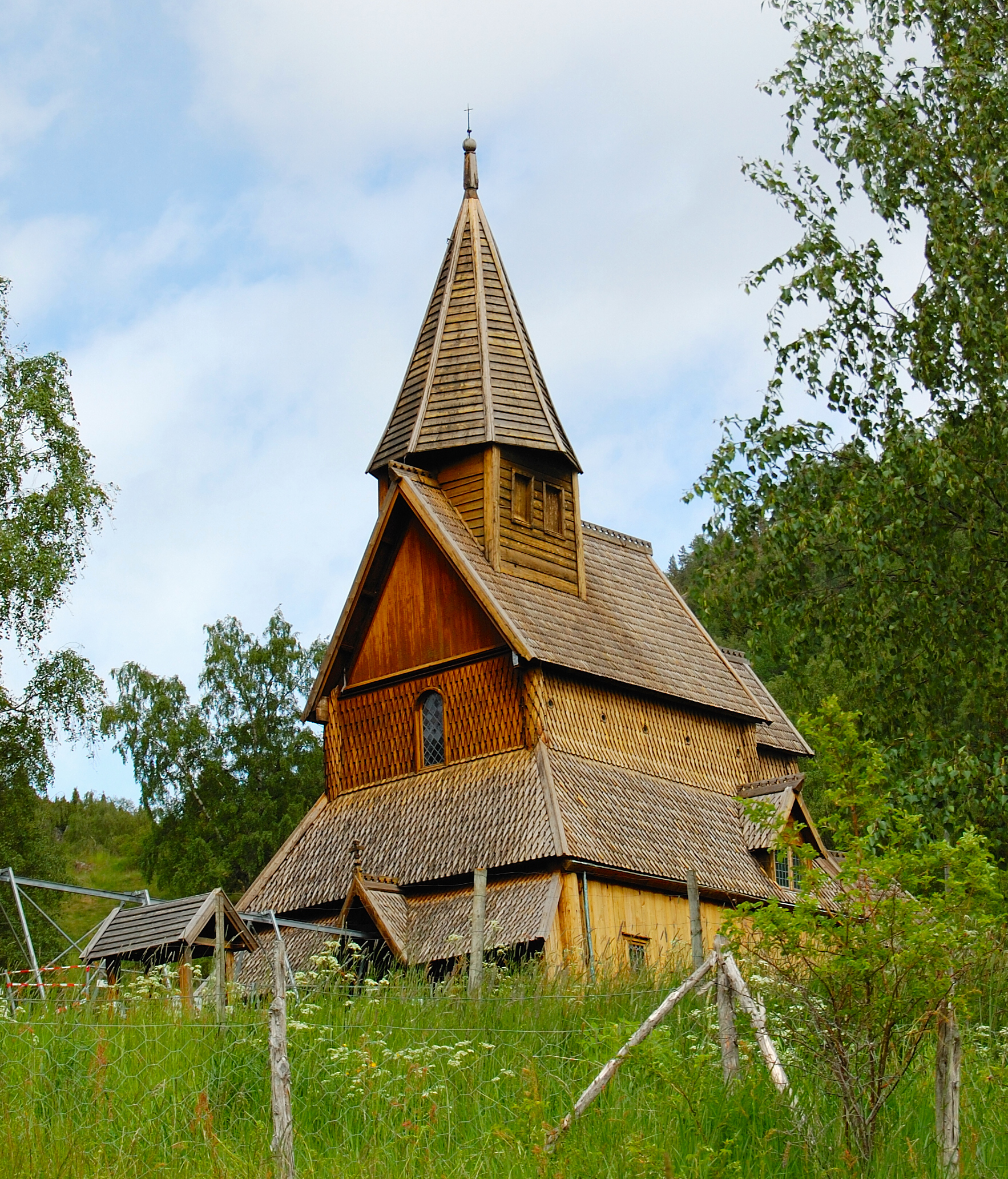
Urnes Stave Church

Another site of medieval pilgrimage in Norway was the island of Selja on the northwest coast, with its memories of Saint Sunniva and its three monastery churches with Celtic influence, similar to Skellig Michael.

=== Reformation ===
The Reformation in Norway was accomplished by force in 1537 when Christian III of Denmark and Norway declared Lutheranism as the official religion of Norway and Denmark, sending the Catholic archbishop, Olav Engelbrektsson, into exile in Lier in the Netherlands (now in Belgium). Catholic priests were persecuted, monastic orders were suppressed, and the crown took over church property, while some churches were plundered and abandoned, even destroyed. Bishops (initially called superintendents) were appointed by the king. This brought forth tight integration between church and state. After the introduction of absolute monarchy in 1660 all clerics were civil servants appointed by the king, but theological issues were left to the hierarchy of bishops and other clergy.

When Norway regained national independence from Denmark in 1814, the Norwegian Constitution recognized the Lutheran church as the state church.

The pietism movement in Norway (embodied to a great extent by the Haugean movement fostered by Hans Nielsen Hauge) has served to reduce the distance between laity and clergy in Norway. In 1842, lay congregational meetings were accepted in church life, though initially with limited influence. In following years, a number of large Christian organizations were created; they still serve as a "second line" in Church structure. The most notable of these are the Norwegian Missionary Society and the Norwegian Lutheran Mission.

During World War II, after Vidkun Quisling became Minister President of Norway and introduced a number of controversial measures such as state-controlled education, the church's bishops and the vast majority of the clergy disassociated themselves from the government in the Foundations of the Church (Kirkens Grunn) declaration of Easter 1942, stating that they would function only as pastors for their congregations, not as civil servants. The bishops were interned with deposed clergy and theological candidates from 1943, but congregational life continued more or less as usual. For three years the Church of Norway was a church free of the State.

Since World War II, a number of structural changes have taken place within the Church of Norway, mostly to institutionalize lay participation in the life of the church.

== Statistics ==
Year	Population	Church of Norway Members	Percentage	Change Annually
2000	4,503,436	3,869,147	85.9%
2005	4,640,219	3,938,723	84.9%	0.2% ▼
2006	4,681,134	3,871,006	82.7%	2.2% ▼
2007	4,737,171	3,873,847	81.8%	0.9% ▼
2008	4,799,252	3,874,823	80.7%	1.1% ▼
2009	4,858,199	3,848,841	79.2%	1.5% ▼
2010	4,920,305	3,835,477	78.0%	1.2% ▼
2011	4,985,870	3,851,145	76.9%	1.1% ▼
2012	5,051,275	3,848,295	75.8%	1.1% ▼
2013	5,109,056	3,843,721	75.2%	0.6% ▼
2014	5,165,802	3,835,973	74.3%	0.9% ▼
2015	5,213,985	3,789,371	72.7%	1.6% ▼
2016	5,258,317	3,758,070	71.5%	1.2% ▼
2017	5,295,619	3,740,920	70.6%	0.9% ▼
2018	5,328,212	3,724,857	69.9%	0.7% ▼
2019	5,367,580	3,686,715	68.7%	1.2% ▼
2020	5,391,369	3,655,556	67.7%	1.0% ▼
2021	5,425,270	3,526,133	64.9%	2.8% ▼
2022	5,488,984	3,500,438	63.8%	1.1% ▼
2023	5,550,203	3,472,195	62.6%	1.2% ▼
2024	5,594,340	3,449,013	61.7%	0.9% ▼
2025	5,627,400	3,427,657	60.9%	0.8% ▼

Norwegians are registered at baptism as members of the Church of Norway, and many remain members, using services such as baptism, confirmation, marriage and burial, rites which still have cultural standing in Norway.

60.9% of Norwegians were members of the state Church of Norway as of the end of 2025, a 0.8% drop compared to the year before and down 11.8% from ten years earlier. However, only 20% of Norwegians say that religion occupies an important place in their life (according to a Gallup poll), making Norway one of the most secular countries of the world (only in Estonia, Sweden and Denmark were the percentages of people who considered religion to be important lower), and only about 3% of the population attends church services or other religious meetings more than once a month. Baptism of infants fell from 96.8% in 1960 to 51.2% in 2025, while the proportion of confirmands fell from 93% in 1960 to 48.7% in 2025. The proportion of weddings to be celebrated in the Church of Norway fell from 85.2% in 1960 to 31.3% in 2019. In 2025 79.8% of all funerals took place in the Church of Norway. A survey conducted by Gallup International in 65 countries in 2005 found that Norway was the least religious among the Western countries surveyed, with only 36% of the population considering themselves religious, 9% considering themselves atheist, and 46% considering themselves "neither religious nor atheist".

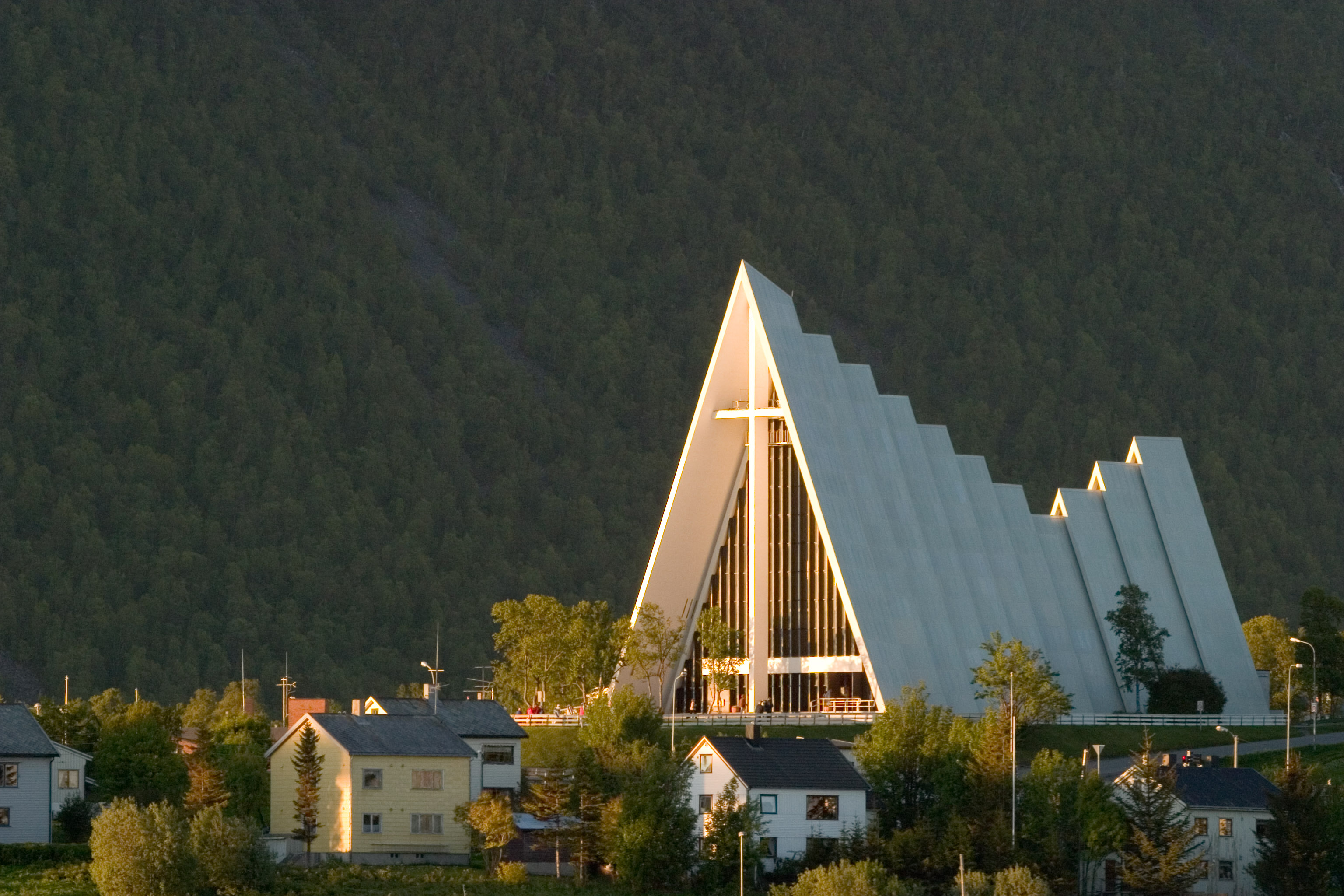
The "Arctic Cathedral" in Tromsø, example of modern church architecture in Norway

By law, all children with at least one parent-member become members of the church. This has been controversial, because many become members without knowing, and this favours the Church of Norway over other churches. This law remained unchanged even after the separation of church and state in 2012.

== Beliefs ==
=== Ordination ===
In 2000, the Church of Norway appointed the first openly partnered gay priest.

=== Marriage ===
In 2007, a majority in the general synod voted in favour of accepting people living in same-sex relations into the priesthood. In 2008, the Norwegian Parliament voted to establish same-sex civil marriages, and the bishops allowed prayers for same-sex couples. Traditionalist clergy and laity from the Church of Norway established the Evangelical Lutheran Diocese of Norway, a nonterritorial ecclesiastical province that only ordains men to holy orders and does not perform same-sex marriages in 2013. The Evangelical Lutheran Diocese of Norway is a member of the International Lutheran Council, which represents Confessional Lutheran bodies around the globe. In 2014, a proposed liturgy for same-sex marriages was rejected by the general synod. This question created much unrest in the Church of Norway.

In 2015, the Church of Norway voted to allow same-sex marriages. The decision was ratified on 11 April 2016. The first same-sex marriage ceremony in the church occurred on 1 February 2017 just after midnight.

== Legal status ==
On 21 May 2012, the Norwegian Parliament passed a constitutional amendment for the second time (such amendments must be passed twice in separate parliaments to come into effect) that granted the Church of Norway increased autonomy, and states that "the Church of Norway, an Evangelical-Lutheran church, remains Norway's people's church, and is supported by the State as such" ('people's church' or folkekirke is also the name of the Danish state church, Folkekirken), replacing the earlier expression which stated that "the Evangelical-Lutheran religion remains the public religion of the State." The constitution also says that Norway's values are based on its Christian and humanist heritage, and according to the Constitution, the king is required to be Lutheran. The government still provides funding for the church as it does with other faith-based institutions, but the responsibility for appointing bishops and provosts now rests with the church instead of the government. Prior to 1997, the appointments of parish priests and residing chaplains was also the responsibility of the government, but the church was granted the right to hire such clergy directly with the new Church Law of 1997. The 2012 amendment implies that the church's own governing bodies, rather than the Council of State, appoints bishops. The government and the parliament no longer have an oversight function with regard to day-to-day doctrinal issues, although the Constitution states that the church is to be Evangelical-Lutheran.

After the changes in 1997 and 2012, until the change in 2017, all clergy remained civil servants (state employees), and the central and regional church administrations remained a part of the state administration. The Church of Norway is regulated by its own law (kirkeloven) and all municipalities are required by law to support the activities of the Church of Norway and municipal authorities are represented in its local bodies. The amendment was a result of a compromise from 2008. Trond Giske, the Minister of Church Affairs, then emphasized that the Church of Norway remains Norway's state church, stating that "the state church is retained. Neither the Labour Party nor the Centre Party had a mandate to agree to separate church and state." Of the government parties, the Labour Party and the Centre Party supported a continued state church, while only the Socialist Left Party preferred a separation of church and state, although all parties eventually voted for the 2008 compromise.

The final amendment passed by a vote of 162–3. The three dissenting votes, Lundteigen, Ramsøy, and Toppe, were all from the Centre Party.

Though still supported by the state of Norway, the church ceased to be the official state religion on 1 January 2017 and its approximately 1,250 active clergy therefore simultaneously ceased to be employed by the Norwegian government.

== See also ==
- 2011 Church of Norway elections
- List of cathedrals in Norway
- Sami Church Council
- Evangelical Lutheran Free Church of Norway
- Lutheran World Federation
- Sjømannskirken
- Nordic Catholic Church
- Norges kirker

Other Nordic national Lutheran churches

- Church of Denmark
- Church of the Faroe Islands
- Evangelical Lutheran Church of Finland
- Church of Iceland
- Church of Sweden
