= Elverhøy Church =

- Elverhøy kirke
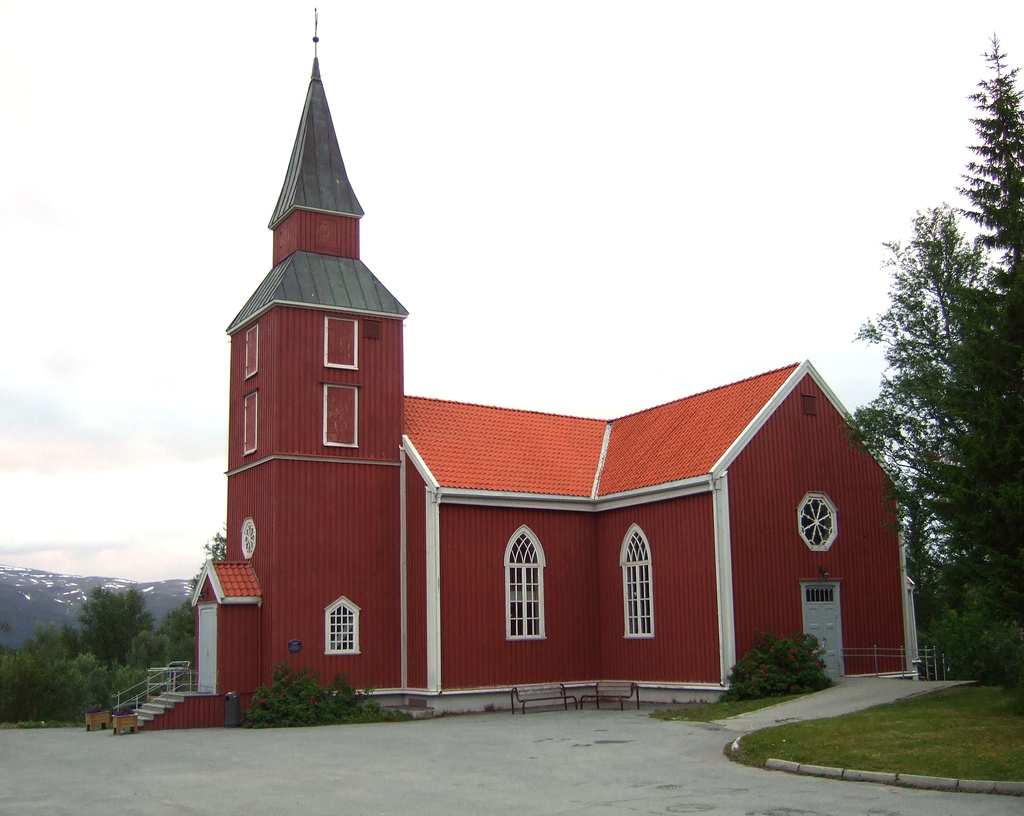
- View of the church
- Elverhøy Church
- 69.6484609°N 18.9212975°E
- Location: Tromsø Municipality, Troms
- Country: Norway
- Denomination: Church of Norway
- Churchmanship: Evangelical Lutheran

History
- Status: Parish church
- Founded: 1974
- Consecrated: 1974

Architecture
- Functional status: Active
- Architectural type: Cruciform
- Completed: 1803 (223 years ago)

Specifications
- Capacity: 435
- Materials: Wood

Administration
- Diocese: Nord-Hålogaland
- Deanery: Tromsø domprosti
- Parish: Elverhøy
- Norwegian Cultural Heritage Site
- Type: Church
- Status: Listed
- ID: 84091

Elverhøy Church (Norwegian: Elverhøy kirke) is a parish church of the Church of Norway in Tromsø Municipality in Troms county, Norway. It is located in the city of Tromsø. It is the church for the Elverhøy parish which is part of the Tromsø domprosti (arch-deanery) in the Diocese of Nord-Hålogaland. The church was built in its current location in 1974 and it now seats about 435 people.

== History ==
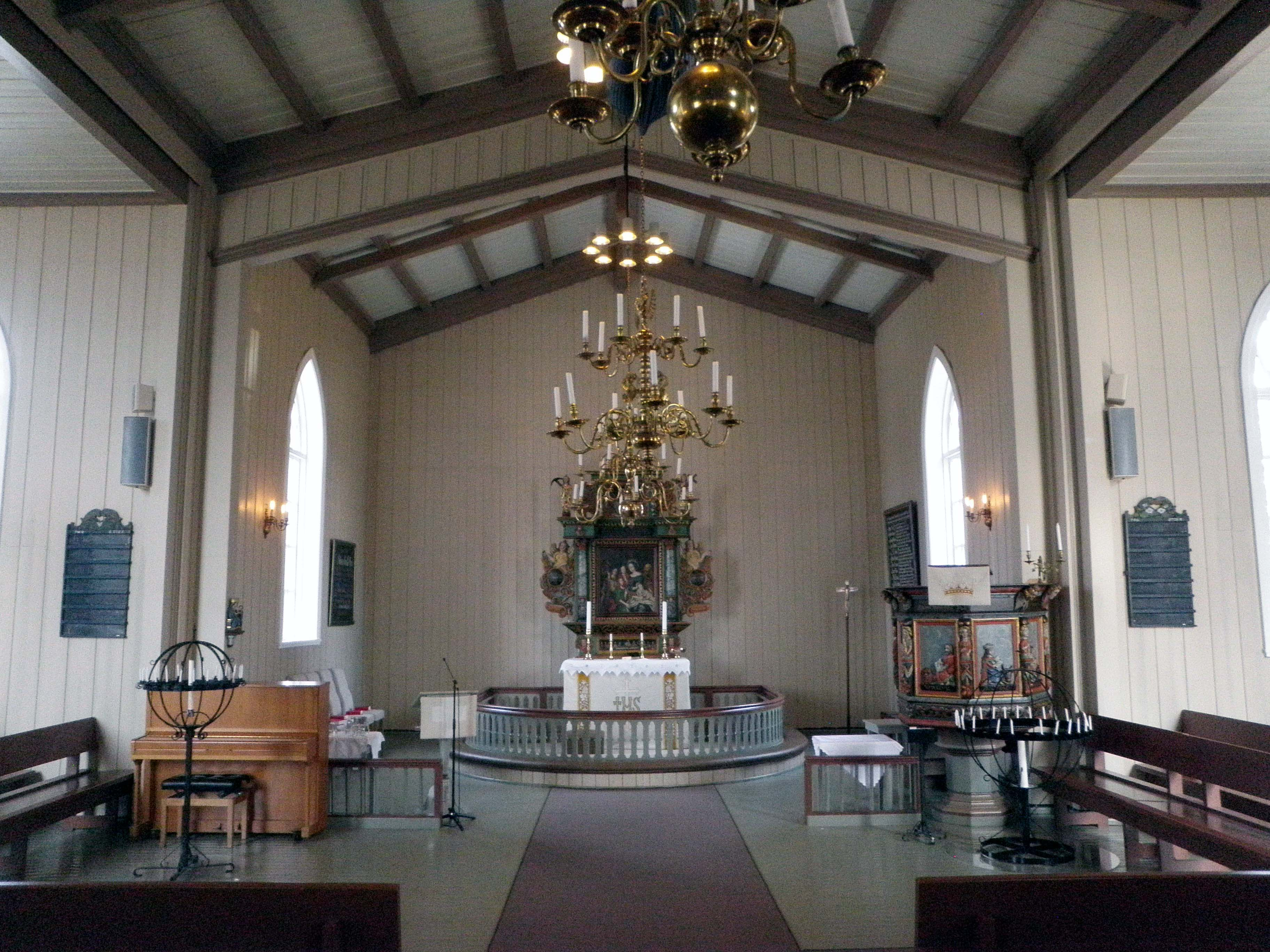
Elverhøy Church Sanctuary

This church building was originally built in 1803 on the site of the present Tromsø Cathedral. The church, then simply known as Tromsø Church served the whole city of Tromsø.

In 1814, this building served as an election church (Norwegian: valgkirke) for the city of Tromsø. Together with more than 300 other parish churches across Norway, it was a polling station for elections to the 1814 Norwegian Constituent Assembly which wrote the Constitution of Norway. This was Norway's first national elections. Each church parish was a constituency that elected people called "electors" who later met together in each county to elect the representatives for the assembly that was to meet at Eidsvoll Manor later that year.

In 1844, the new Diocese of Hålogaland was established and Tromsø was to be the seat of the Bishop. A new cathedral was commissioned and in 1861, the new Tromsø Cathedral was completed. This new cathedral was on the same site as the Tromsø Church, so prior to building the new cathedral, the old church was dismantled and moved a few hundred meters south of the city boundary. It was located outside the city and was then known as the Landkirke (meaning rural church) and later it was renamed the Tromsøysund Church. During that time, it was the parish church for Tromsøysund Municipality. After the new Tromsdalen Church was built in 1965 as the new "main church" for Tromsøysund Municipality, this church was eventually closed, dismantled, and moved once again.

In 1974, this church building was reopened as Elverhøy Church, about 1.5 kilometres (0.93 mi) west of the city centre of Tromsø on the island of Tromsøya. A full basement was built for its present location, making room for a parish hall, kitchen, cloakroom, and bathroom facilities. It is now somewhat different than its original design. Now, the red, wooden church is a cruciform design constructed with cog jointed timber and the siding is vertical panelling. There is a large steeple over the main entrance now that was not originally present when it was built in 1803.

== Gallery ==
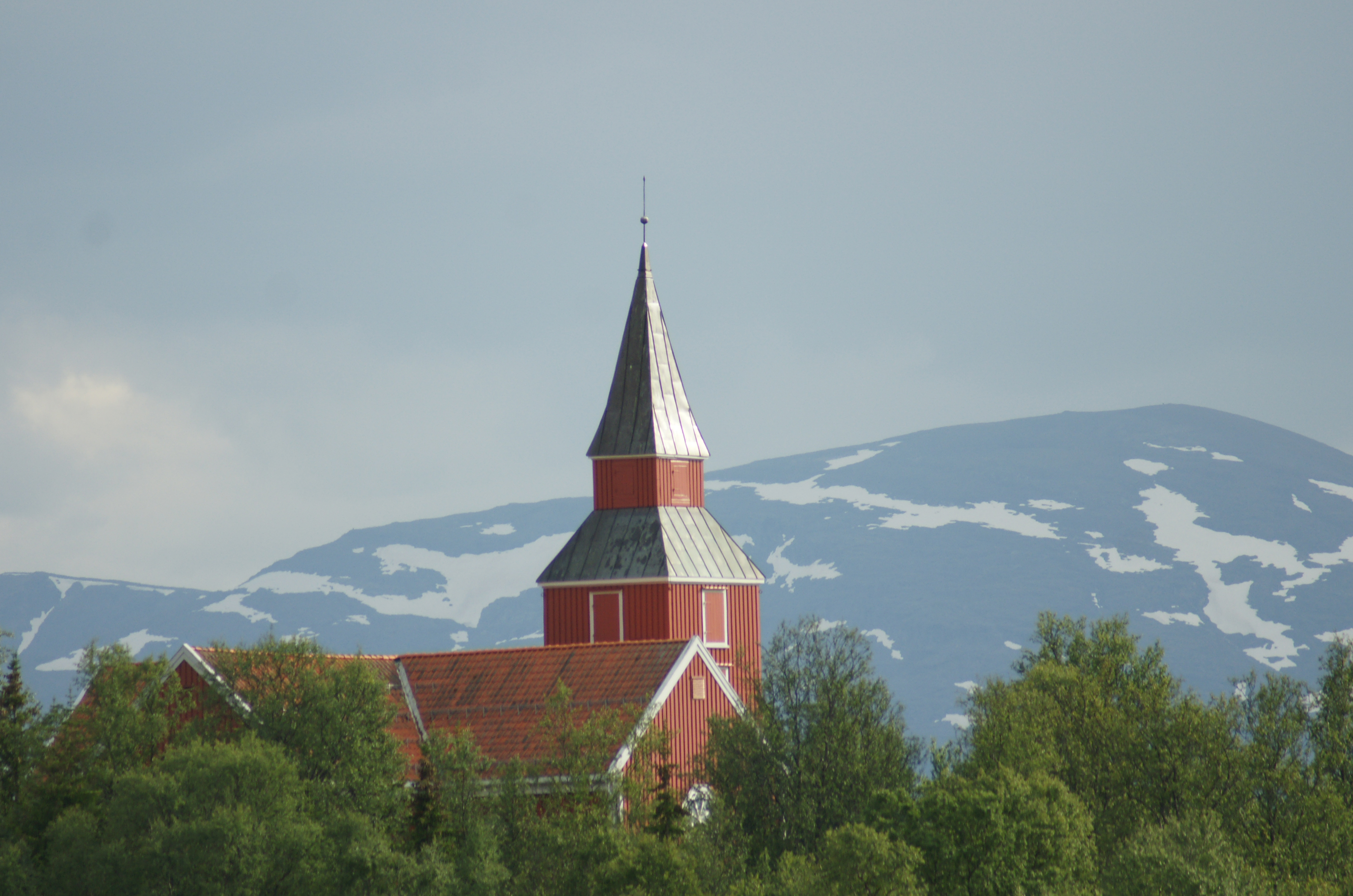
Exterior view

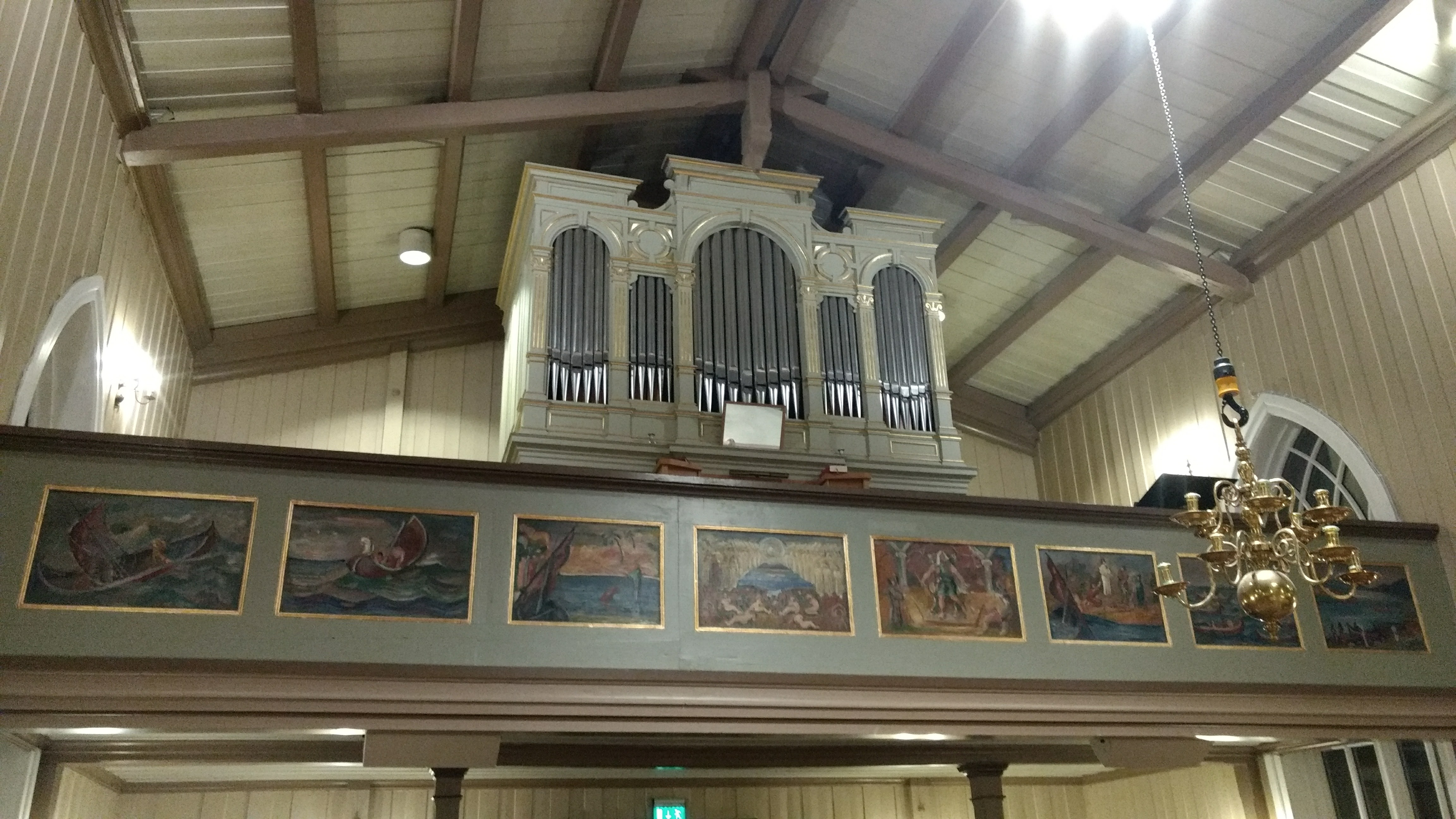
Organ Loft

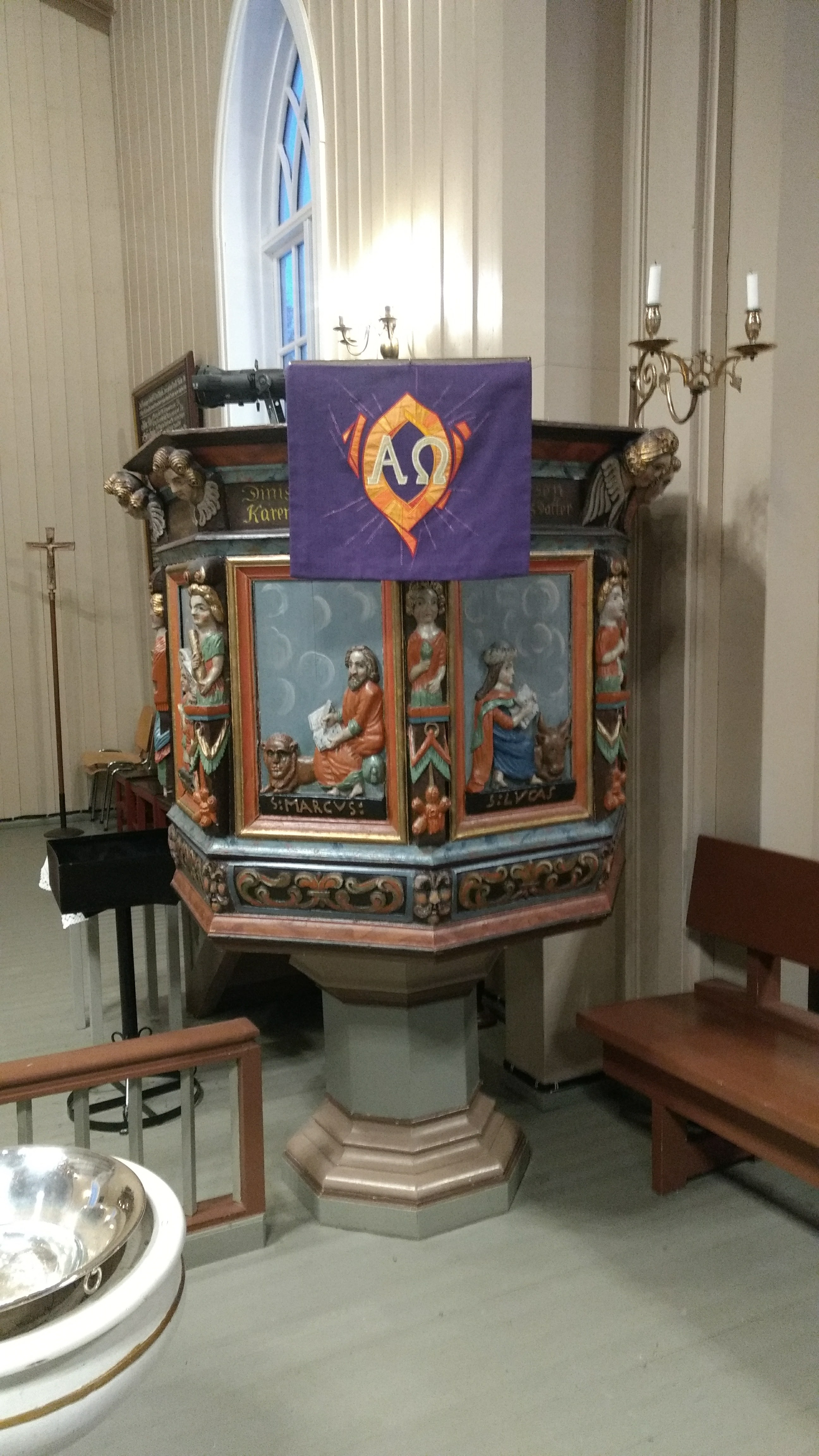
Pulpit

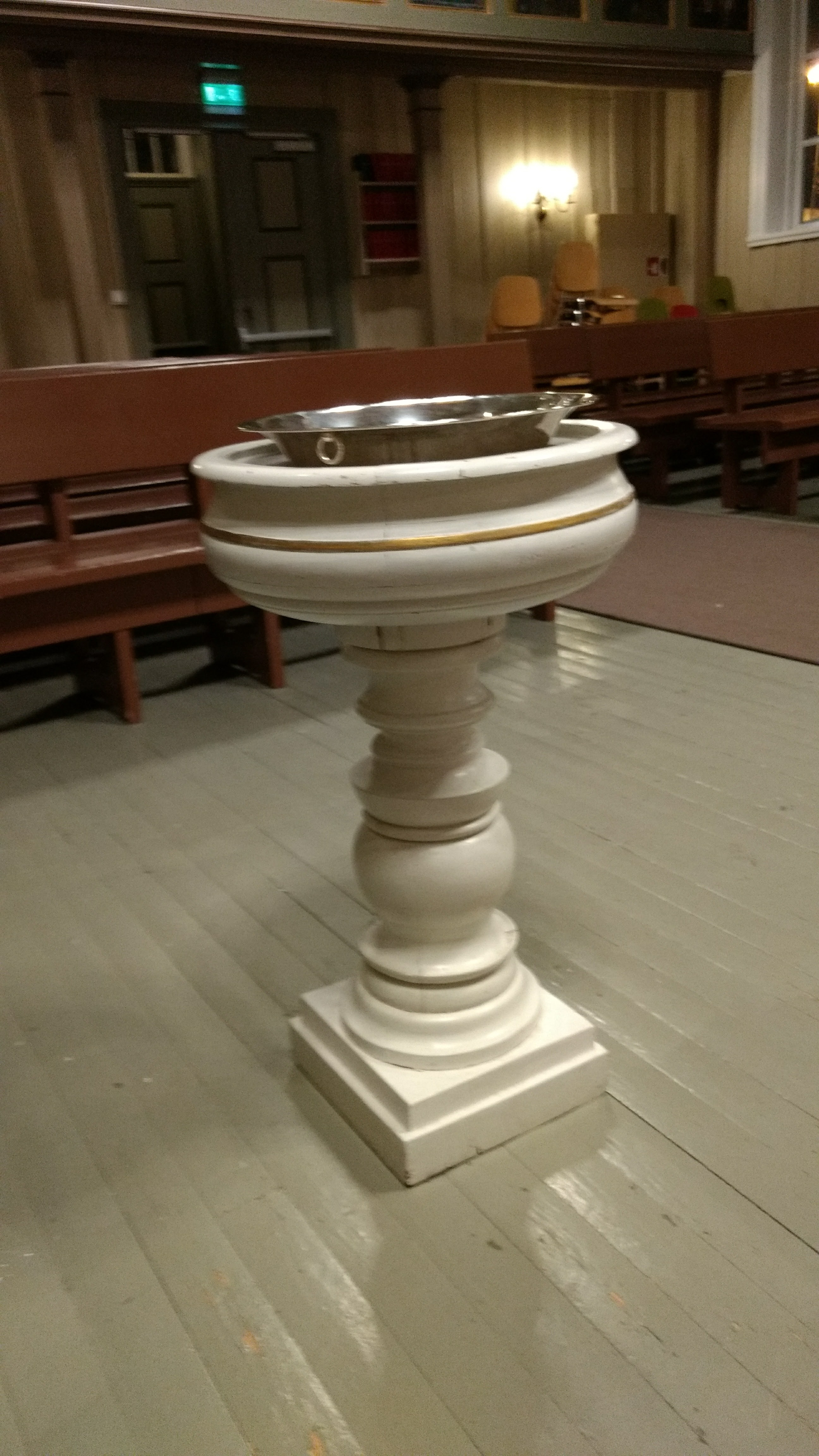
Baptismal Font

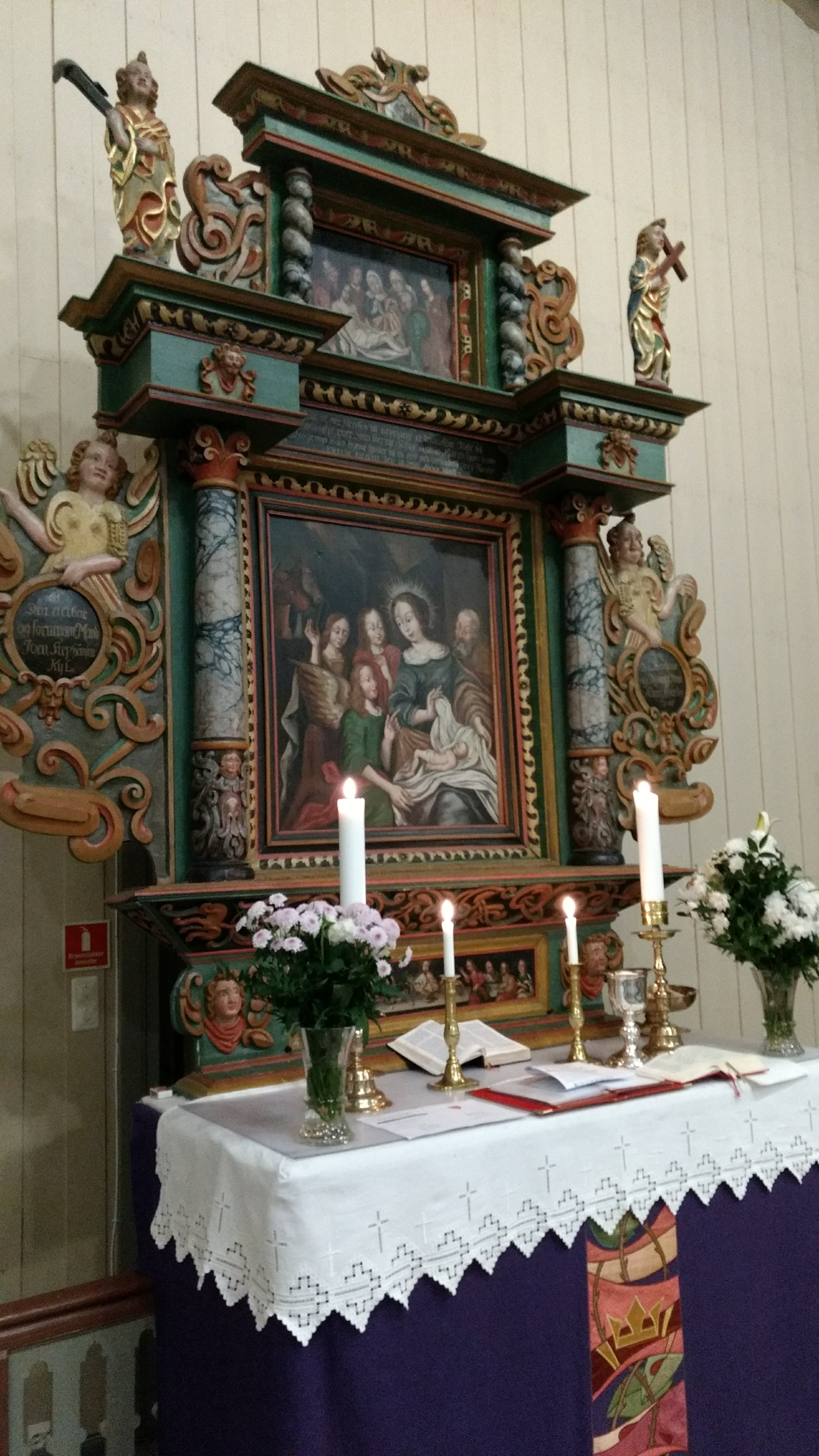
Altar

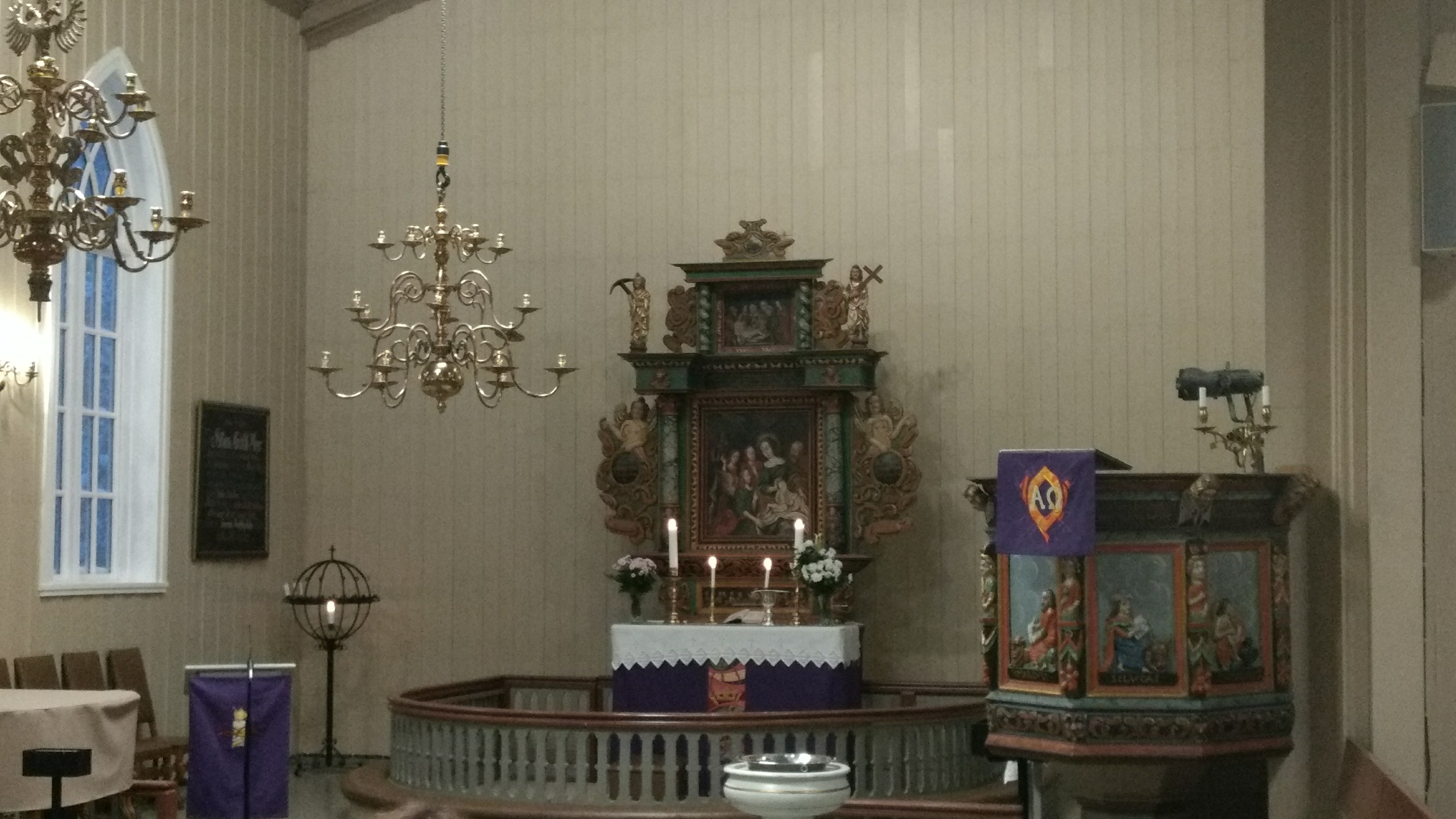
Pulpit and Altar

== See also ==
- List of churches in Nord-Hålogaland
