= Arctic Cathedral =

Tromsdalen Church
- Arctic Cathedral (Ishavskatedralen); Tromsøysund kirke / Tromsdalen kirke
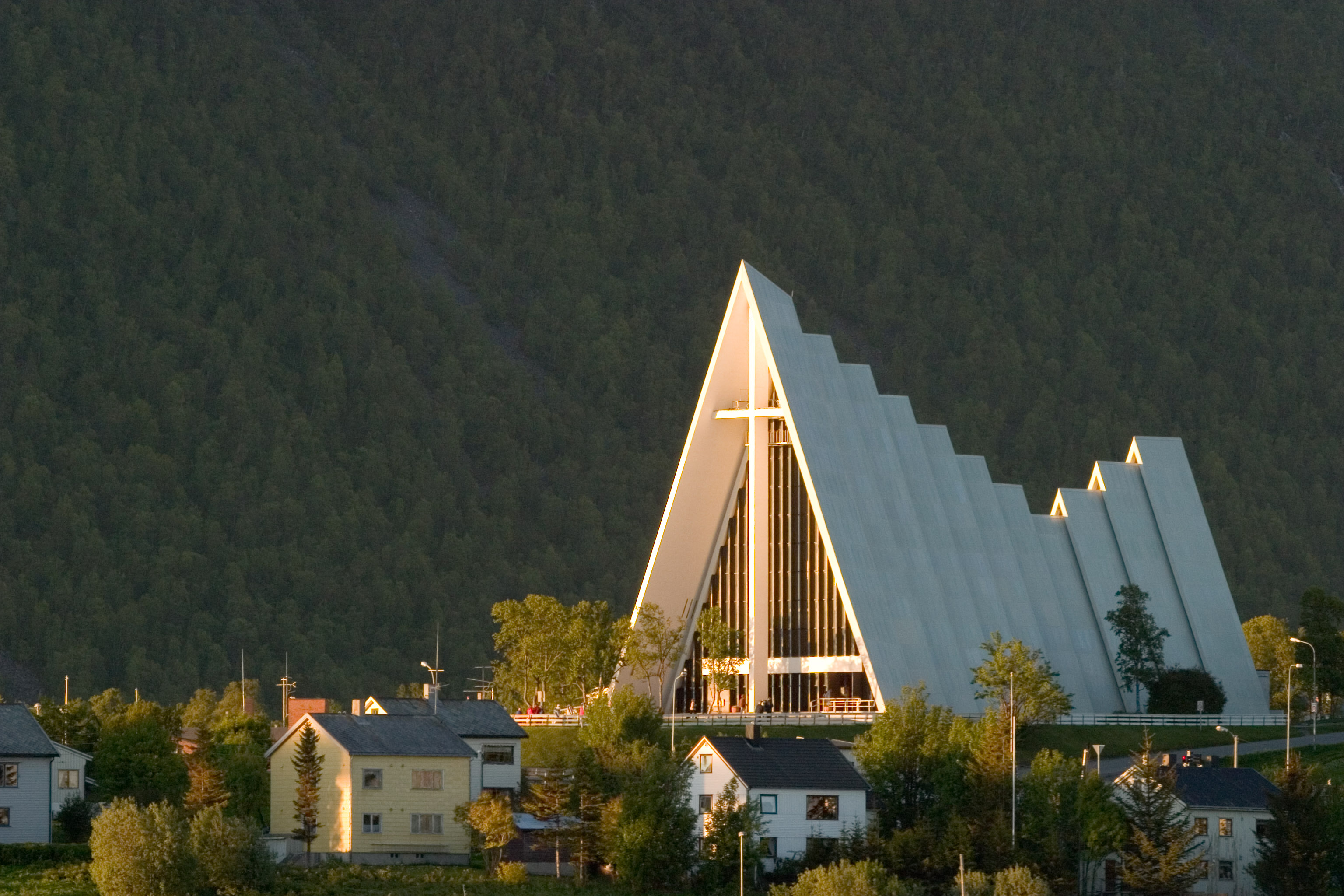
- Arctic Cathedral illuminated by the midnight sun
- Tromsdalen Church
- 69.6482°N 18.9871°E
- Location: Tromsø Municipality, Troms
- Country: Norway
- Denomination: Church of Norway
- Churchmanship: Evangelical Lutheran
- Website: www.ishavskatedralen.no

History
- Status: Parish church
- Consecrated: 19 November 1965

Architecture
- Functional status: Active
- Architect: Jan Inge Hovig
- Architectural type: Long church
- Style: Modernist
- Groundbreaking: 1 April 1964
- Completed: 1965 (61 years ago)
- Construction cost: 4,169,815 kr

Specifications
- Capacity: 600
- Materials: Cast-in-place aluminium-coated concrete panels

Administration
- Diocese: Nord-Hålogaland
- Deanery: Tromsø domprosti
- Parish: Tromsøysund
- Norwegian Cultural Heritage Site
- Type: Church
- Status: Listed
- ID: 85668

Tromsdalen Church or the Arctic Cathedral (Norwegian: Tromsdalen kirke, Ishavskatedralen) is a parish church of the Church of Norway in Tromsø Municipality in Troms county, Norway. It is located in the Tromsdalen valley on the east side of Tromsø. It is the church for the Tromsøysund parish, which is part of the Tromsø domprosti (arch-deanery) in the Diocese of Nord-Hålogaland. The modern concrete and metal church was built in a long church style in 1965 using plans drawn up by architect Jan Inge Hovig. The church seats about 600 people.

== Name ==
The official name Tromsdalen Church, the church is commonly nicknamed the Ishavskatedralen which means "The Cathedral of the Arctic Ocean," or simply the "Arctic Cathedral." Despite its nickname, it is a parish church and not, in fact, a cathedral as it is commonly called.

== Construction ==
The church was designed by architect Jan Inge Hovig and is built mainly of concrete. The main contractor for the construction was Ing. F. Selmer A/S Tromsø. The church is one of the most notable churches in Tromsø due to its design. However, Tromsø does have other churches of interest, such as the Protestant Tromsø Cathedral, which is noted for being the only wooden cathedral in Norway, and the Catholic Cathedral of Our Lady, Tromsø.

The groundbreaking of the church was on 1 April 1964, and it was completed in 1965. The new church was consecrated on 19 November 1965 by Bishop Monrad Norderval. The church is built out of cast-in-place aluminium-coated concrete panels. The shape of the church is believed to be a reference to the nearby twin-peaked island of Håja.

In 1972, a glass mosaic titled "The Return of Christ" was added to the eastern side, made by Victor Sparre. The church acquired an organ built by Grönlunds Orgelbyggeri in 2005, with three manuals, pedals, 42 stops, and 2940 pipes. It replaced the old opus nr. 12 organ delivered by Vestlandske Orgelverksted, Hareid, which had 22 voices and 124 keys.

== Gallery ==
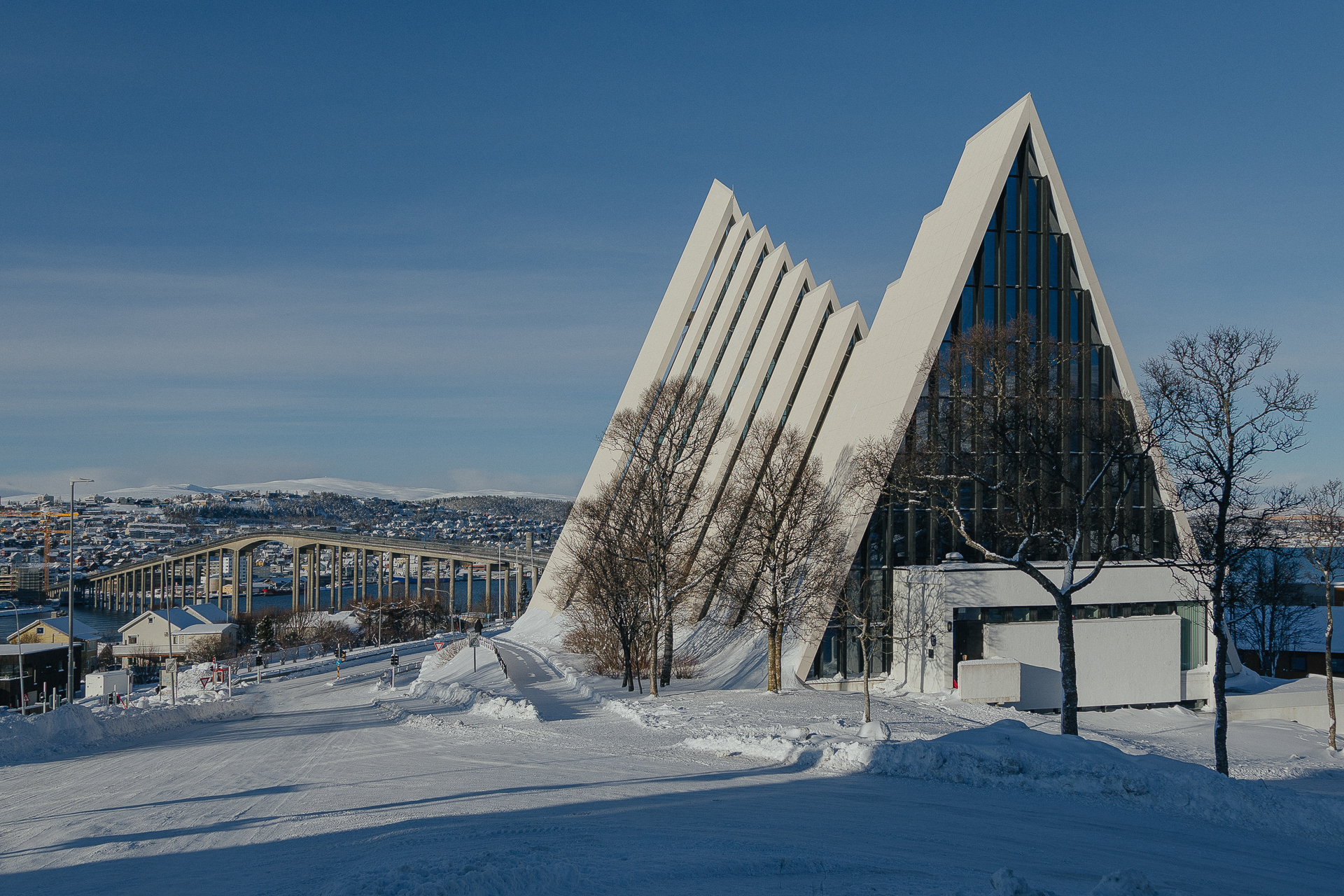
Southern façade

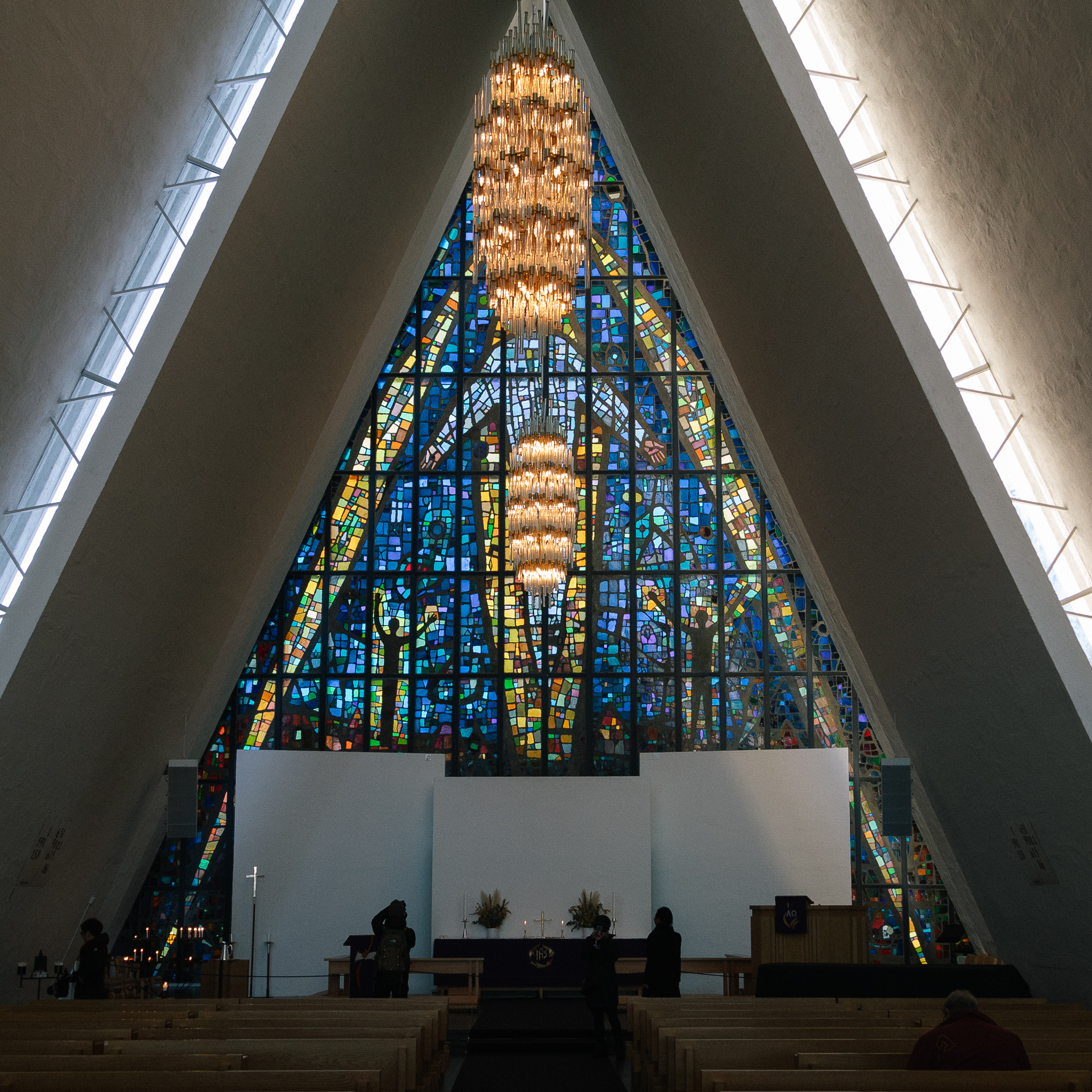
Glass mosaic "the Return of Christ"

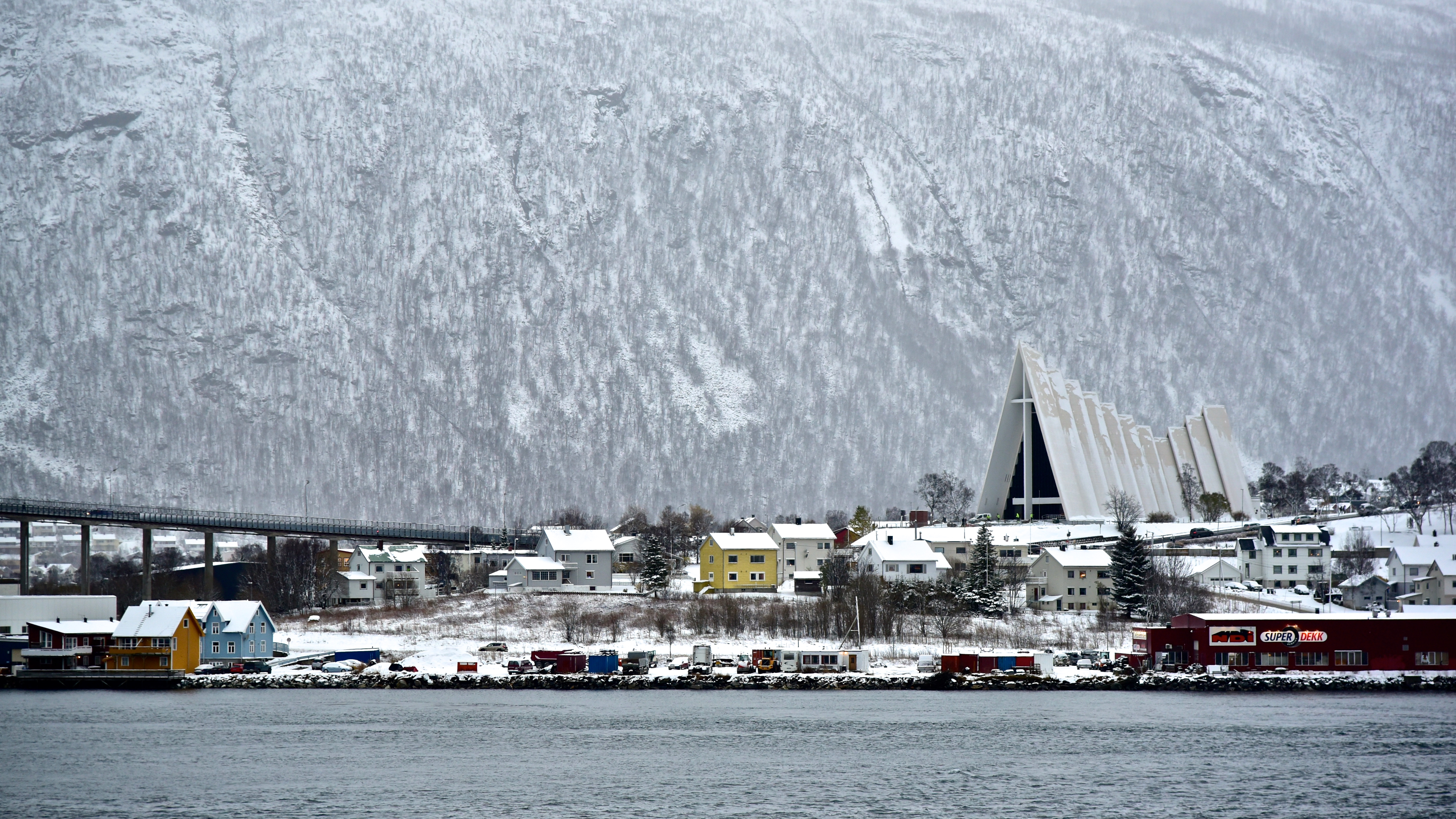
View from Tromsøya

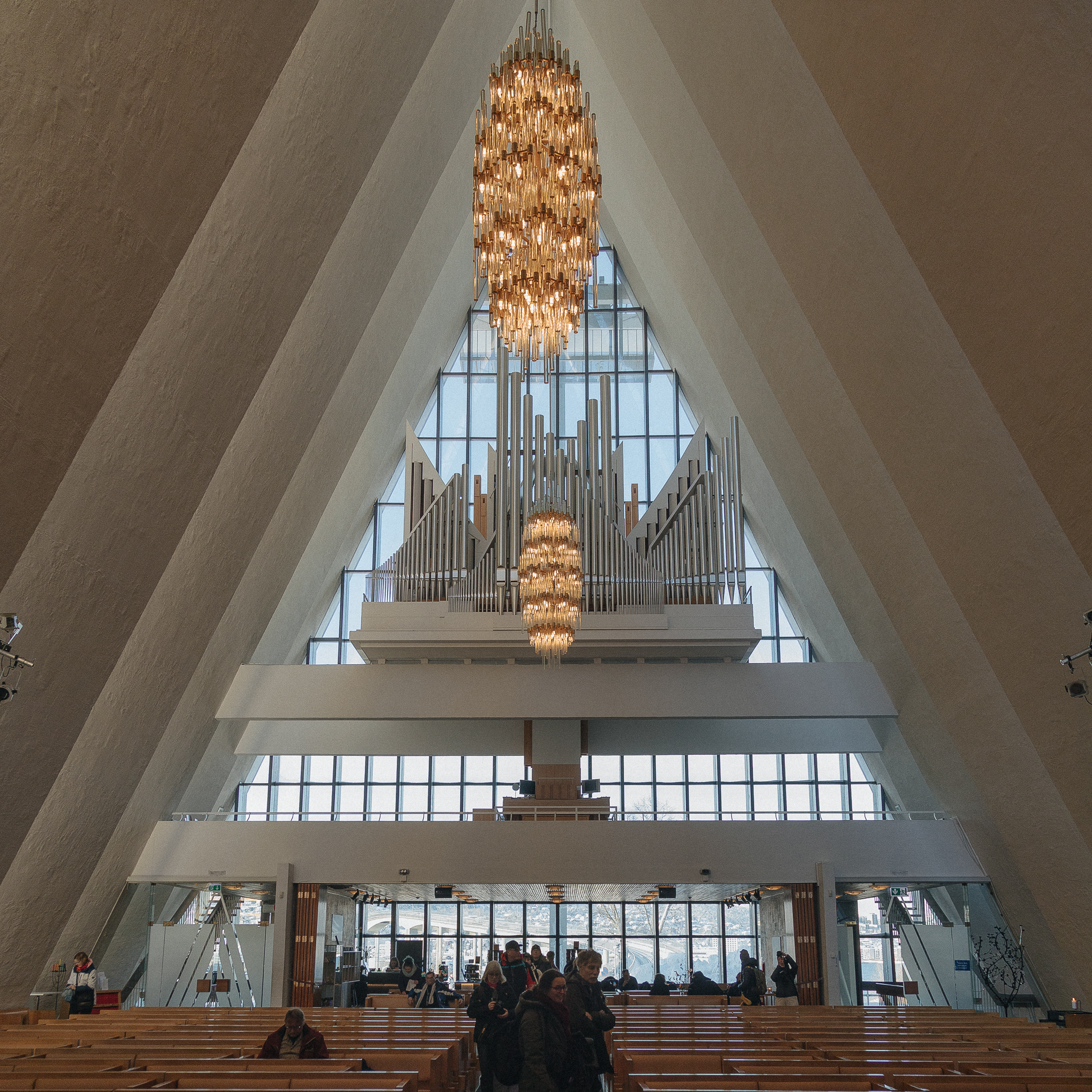
Church organ

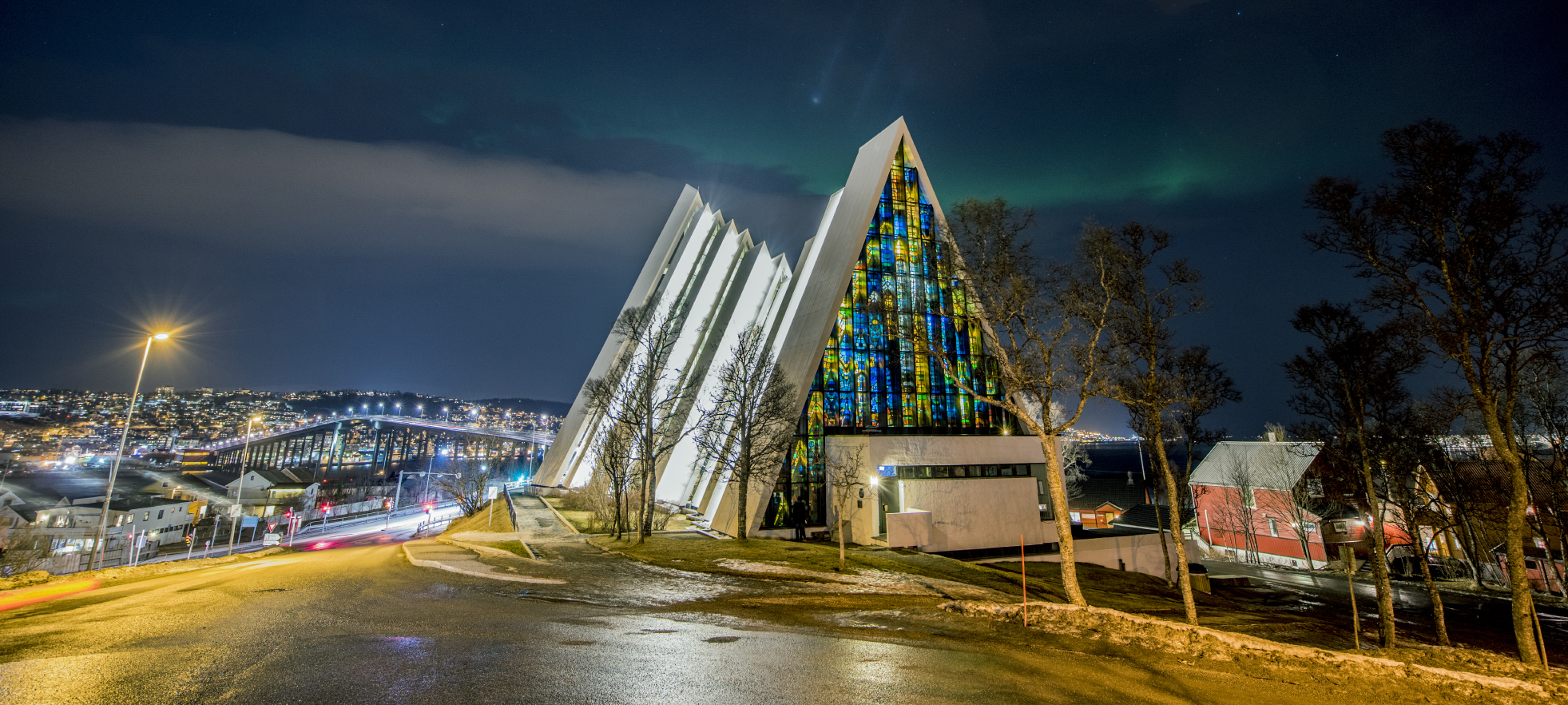
Night view of Southwest façade

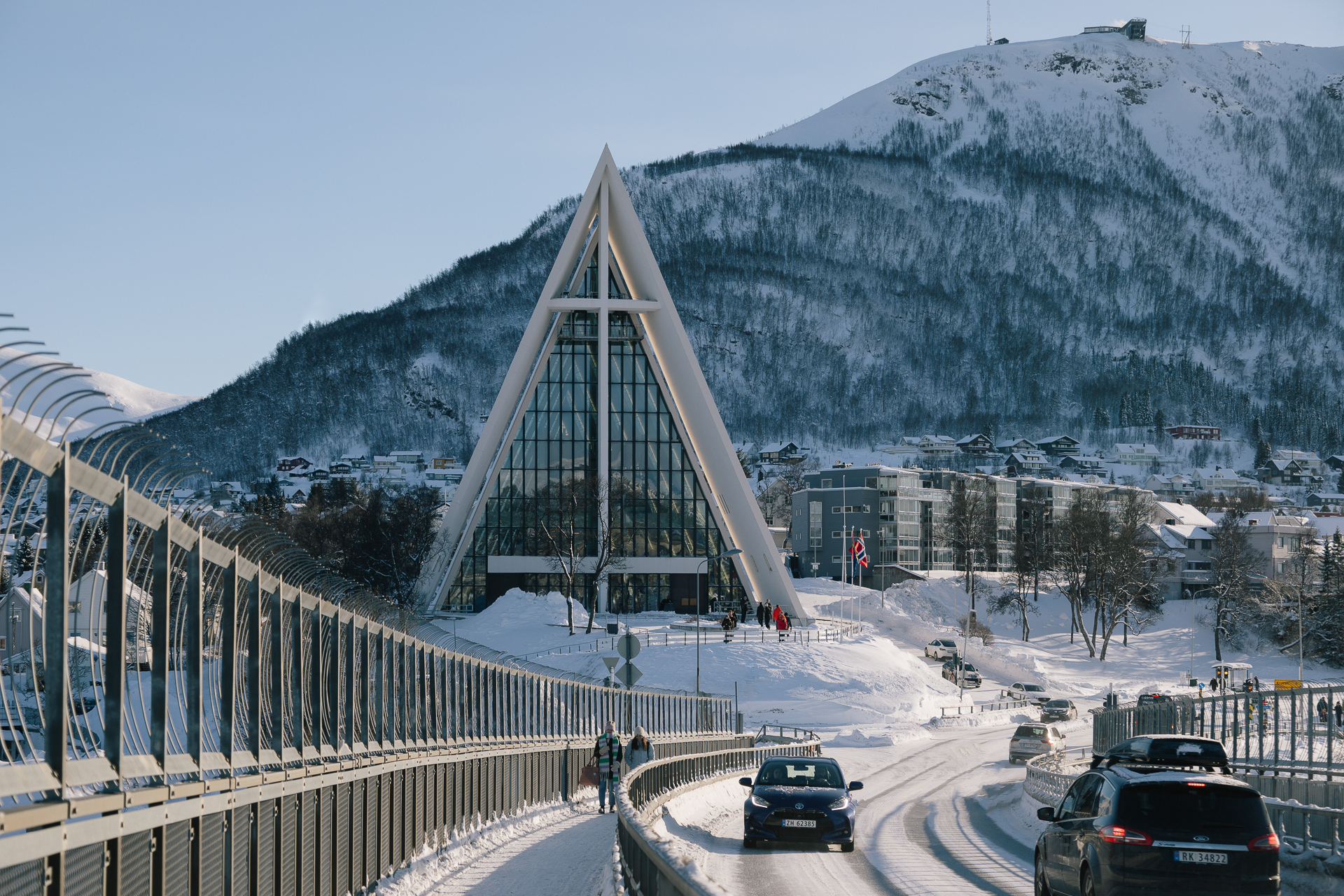
View from the Tromsø Bridge

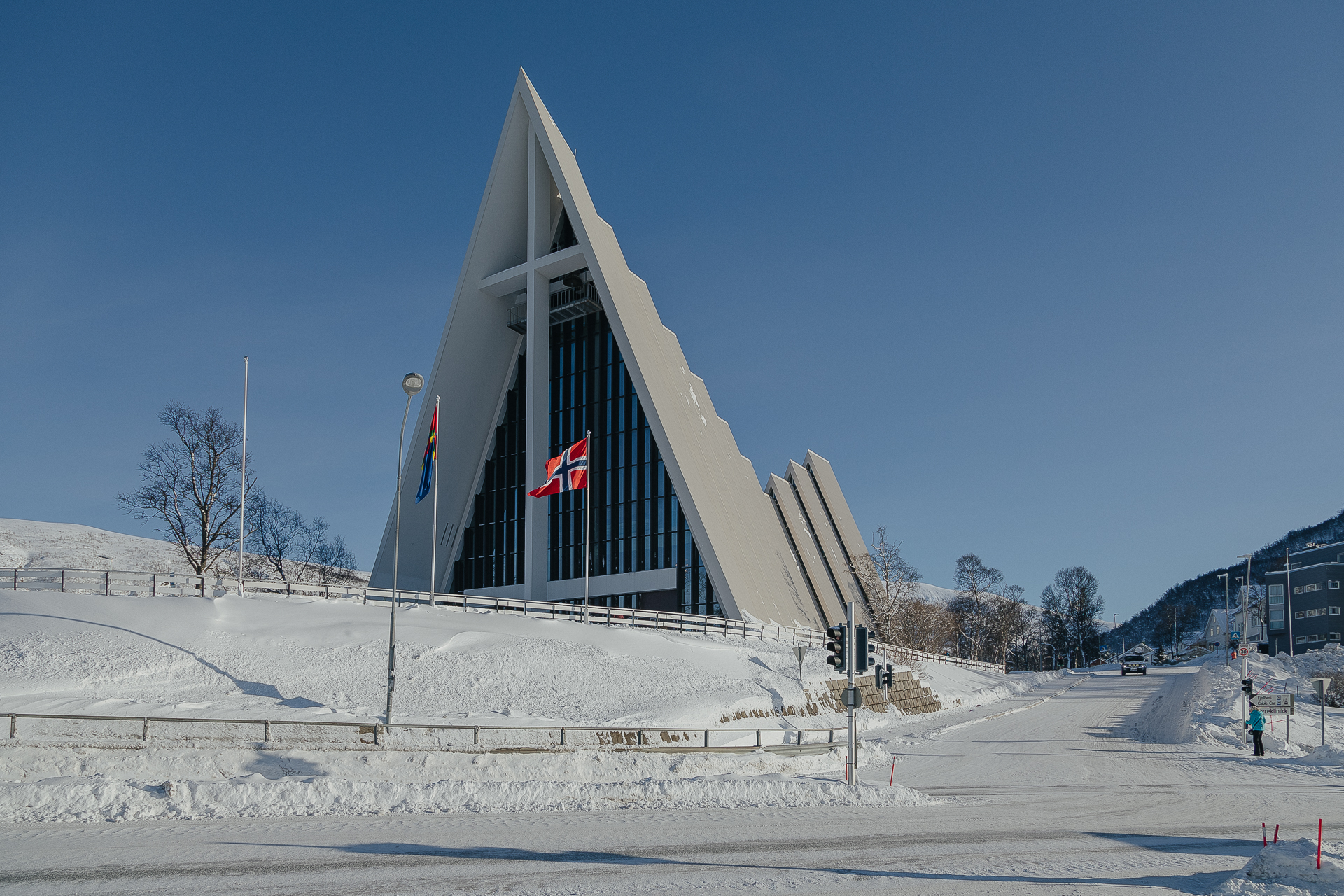
Western façade

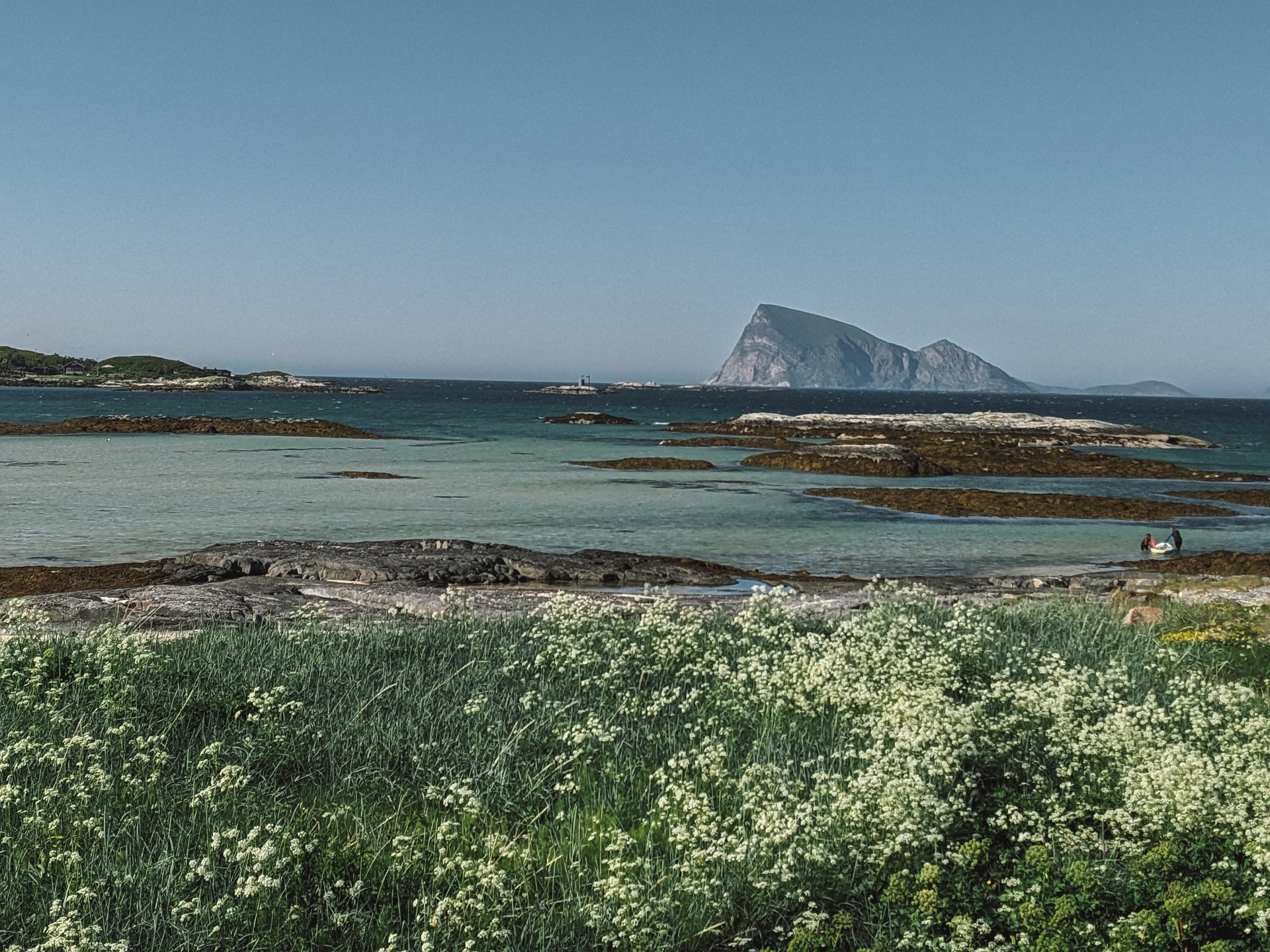
Håja island inspired shape of the church

== See also ==
- List of churches in Nord-Hålogaland
- Church of Norway
- Tromsø Cathedral – the Cathedral of the Diocese of Nord-Hålogaland
