= Alf Wiig =

Norwegian bishop

Alf Kristian Theodor Wiig
- Bishop
- Church: Church of Norway
- Diocese: Nord-Hålogaland
- In office: 1952–1961

Personal details
- Born: 24 August 1891 Kristiansund, Norway
- Died: 10 July 1974 (aged 82) Norway
- Denomination: Christian
- Occupation: Priest

Alf Kristian Theodor Wiig (24 August 1891 – 10 July 1974) was a Norwegian bishop in the Church of Norway.

Wiig was born in Kristiansund, Norway. He served as vicar in Karasjok Municipality from 1923 to 1934. During this time, he also served as mayor of Karasjok Municipality from 1932-1934. He later served as vicar in Sortland Municipality from 1934 to 1945. He was then the dean of Finnmark from 1945 until 1951 and he was the dean of Tromsø Cathedral from 1951 until 1952. In 1952, he became the first bishop of the Diocese of Nord-Hålogaland, a position he held until 1961. He died on 10 July 1974.

Church of Norway titles
New diocese (created from Diocese of Hålogaland)	Bishop of Nord-Hålogaland; 1952–1961	Succeeded by Monrad Norderval
