= Ola M. Steinholt =

Norwegian bishop

Ola Markus Steinholt
- Bishop
- Church: Church of Norway
- Diocese: Nord-Hålogaland
- In office: 1990–2001

Orders
- Ordination: 1961 in Trondenes Church

Personal details
- Born: 4 October 1934 Trondenes, Norway
- Died: 20 April 2009 (aged 74) Tromsø, Norway
- Denomination: Christian
- Occupation: Priest
- Education: Cand.theol. (1959)
- Alma mater: University of Oslo

Ola Markus Steinholt (4 October 1934—20 April 2009) was a Norwegian bishop in the Church of Norway.

He was born in Trondenes Municipality, Norway in 1934. He graduated from the University of Oslo with the cand.theol. degree in 1959. He was a parish priest in Vefsn Municipality starting in 1971, after having been a military chaplain for some time. He served as dean in Tromsø Cathedral from 1984 to 1990 and bishop of the Diocese of Nord-Hålogaland from 1990 to 2001. He died in April 2009 in Tromsø, Norway.

Church of Norway titles
Preceded by Arvid Nergård	Bishop of Nord-Hålogaland; 1990–2001	Succeeded by Per Oskar Kjølaas
