= Herborg Finnset =

Norwegian prelate

The Right Reverend Herborg Finnset
- Bishop of Nidaros
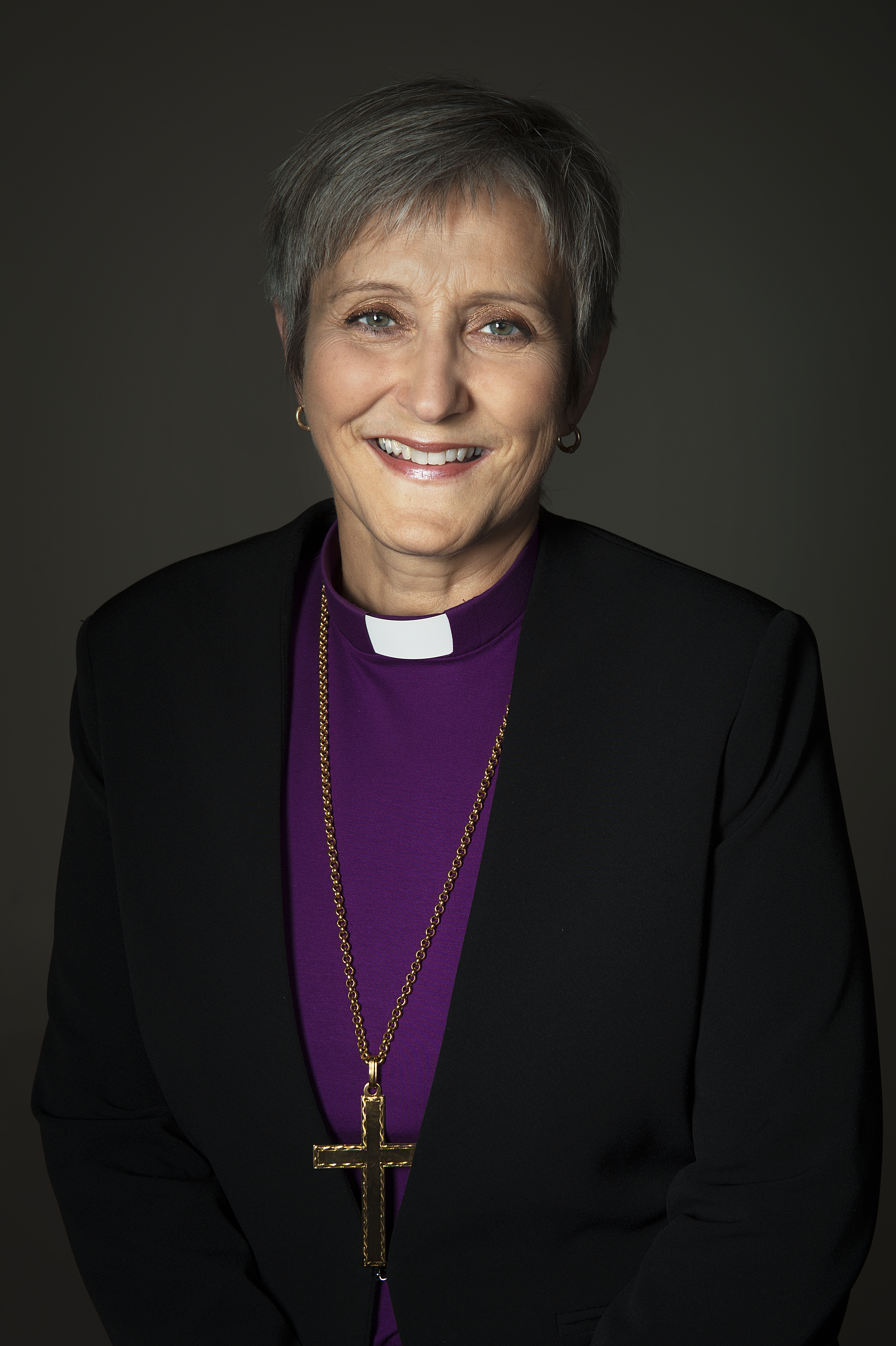
- Herborg Finnset in 2017
- Church: Church of Norway
- Diocese: Nidaros
- Elected: 2017
- Predecessor: Tor Singsaas

Orders
- Ordination: 3 July 1988
- Consecration: 10 September 2017 by Helga Haugland Byfuglien

Personal details
- Born: 28 March 1961 (age 65) Sørreisa, Troms, Norway
- Denomination: Lutheran

Herborg Oline Finnset (born 28 March 1961 in Sørreisa, Troms) is a Norwegian prelate of the Church of Norway who is the Bishop of Nidaros as of 2018. Finnset is one of the forces behind Tromsø Church Music Festival.

== Biography ==
Finnset graduated from the Faculty of Law in Oslo, and was ordained priest in Oslo Cathedral in 1988. She had worked in Hålogaland as priest at Hammerfest Church, and later Lenvik Church. Then, Finnset was pastor of Strinda parish in the Diocese of Nidaros, and later became Dean of Tromsø domprosti from 2005 till 2017. In 2014, she was also nominated as a candidate for the bishopric of Diocese of Nord-Hålogaland however she lost the majority of votes from the Church Council by seven to eight, and Olav Øygard was elected bishop.

She was unanimously elected bishop of Nidaros by the Church Council in 2017, and was consecrated and installed as bishop on 10 September 2017 by the Primate of the Church of Norway Bishop-Preses Helga Haugland Byfuglien in Nidaros Cathedral.

Religious titles
| Preceded by Tor Singsaas | Bishop of Nidaros; 2017–present | Incumbent |
