= Olav Øygard =

Norwegian bishop

The Right Reverend Olav Øygard
- Bishop Emeritus of Nord-Hålogaland
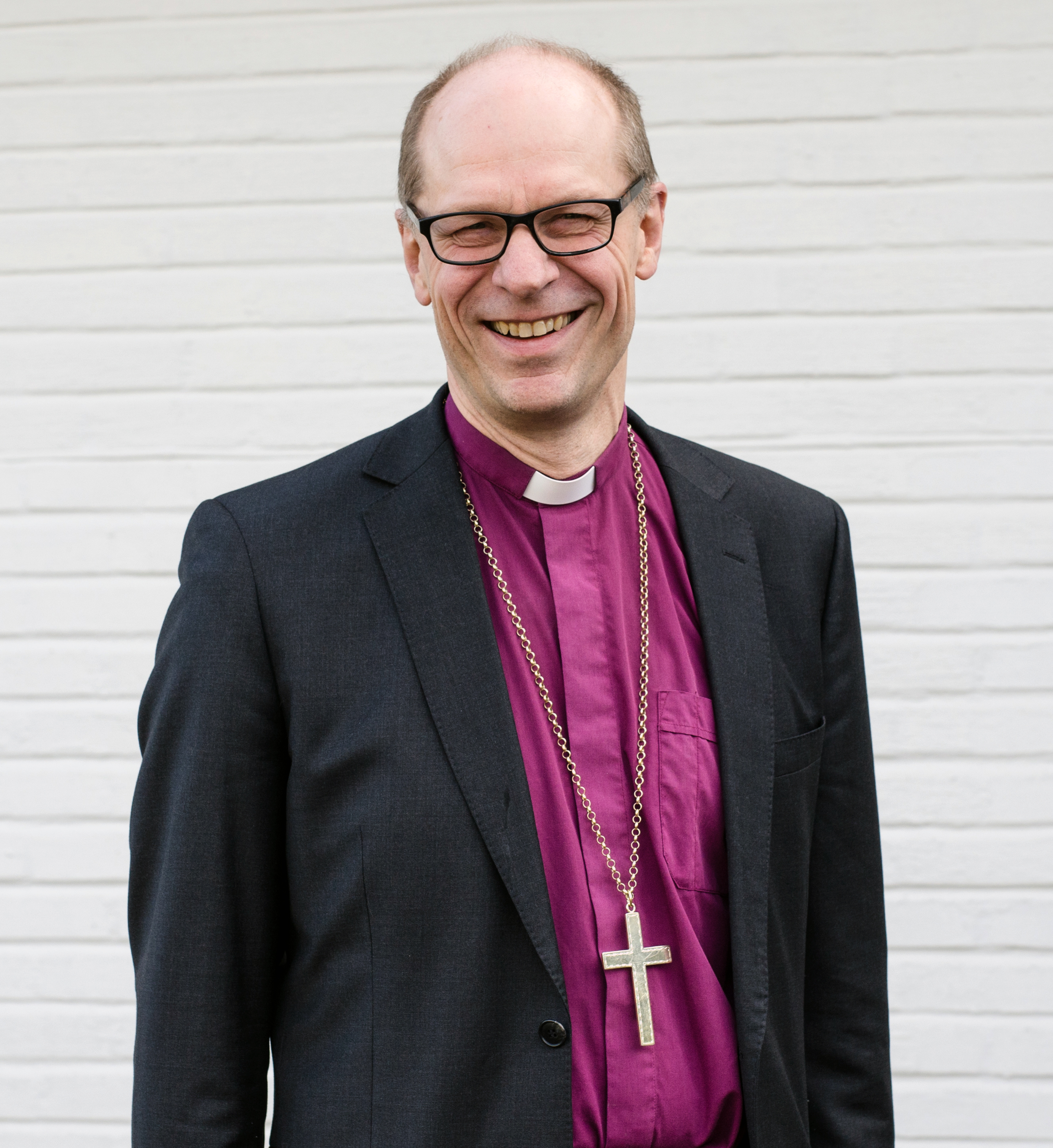
- Øygard in 2015
- Church: Church of Norway
- Diocese: Nord-Hålogaland
- Elected: 25 September 2014
- Retired: 17 August 2025
- Predecessor: Per Oskar Kjølaas
- Successor: Stig Lægdene
- Previous posts: Priest, family counselor, youth minister

Orders
- Ordination: 2 August 1981
- Consecration: 9 November 2014 by Helga Haugland Byfuglien

Personal details
- Born: 29 July 1956 (age 70) Norway
- Denomination: Lutheran
- Residence: Tromsø, Norway
- Education: MF Norwegian School of Theology (Cand.theol.)

Olav Øygard (born 29 July 1956) is a Norwegian Lutheran prelate of the Church of Norway who served as the Bishop of Nord-Hålogaland 2014–2025. Nord-Hålogaland covers Troms and Finnmark countries, and also Svalbard. Øygard is a self-described "middle of the Church" theologian.

== Early life and education ==
Øygard was born on 29 July 1956.

His earned his Cand.theol. degree in the autumn of 1980 from the MF Norwegian School of Theology. In 1989, he completed a course on Pastoral Clinical Education, and in 1993, he completed a semester course on the Sami language at the University of Tromsø. In 1996, he completed a course on Parental Education (MPE), and in 1998 he finished another class on the topic of separated parents. In 2002, he returned to the MF Norwegian School of Theology for a Labor Supervisor Education course, and again in 2009 for a pastoral leadership development program. In 2014, he participated in a course for priestly education at the Misjonshøgskolen (MHS).

== Priesthood ==
Øygard was ordained to the priesthood on 2 August 1981 in the Karasjok Church. From August 1981 to April 1985, he worked in ministerial positions in Finnmark, including as vicar of the Kautokeino Church in Kautokeino Municipality from September 1983 to June 1984. On 25 April 1985, he took office as senior pastor in Sør-Varanger Municipality, working out of the Kirkenes Church. During that time, he also served as a counselor at the Kirkenes family office, serving in that position until February 1991. In Finnmark, he also spent time working as a youth minister in schools. He remained pastor in Kirkenes until June 1991, when he was transferred to Alta Church in Alta Municipality. There, he served as a chaplain until February 2006, when he became the head pastor of the Alta Parish. He remained in that position since 2011, though he took a short leave from March 2008 to April 2009, when he served as a counselor at the Alta family office.

In addition to his ministerial positions, Øygard was a member of a number of boards and committees. From 1990 to 1998, he was a member of the diocesan council of the Diocese of Nord-Hålogaland, serving as deputy chairman for part of that time. From 1996 to 2008, he was on the board of Northern Norway Diaconal Foundation. During that time, he sat on the Impact Council, a religious cooperation agency of the Church of Norway, reaching out to Lutheran organizations in Germany, the United Kingdom, and the United States. From 2001 to 2004, he was a member of the National Council for Priorities in Health Care. From 2002 to 2007 he was a member, and for some time chairman, of the North Sami Liturgy Committee. Until 2014, he was chair of the Norwegian Missionary Society's activities in Finnmark county.

In addition, he was involved in programs working with disabled people abroad, in the Dominican Republic, Kenya, Romania, Russia, and Tanzania.

== Episcopal career ==
=== Election ===
In late August 2014, the Church Council of the Diocese of Nord-Hålogaland met in Tromsø to elect a new bishop. The election was between the three candidates who had received the most support in a preliminary poll: Olav Øygard, the 58-year-old priest in Alta, Herborg Finnset, a 53-year-old priest in Tromsø, and Hans Arne Akerø, the 65-year-old section head of the Church Council. While Øygard and Finnset were the leading two in the preliminary/advisory poll, both faced challenges to becoming elected. While Finnset was the favorite of most bishops, she faced opposition from the theologically conservative Laestadians in the diocese, who warned they would not accept a female bishop. And the most prominent issue dividing the candidates was homosexual marriage, with Finnset supporting it, and Øygard and Akerø opposing it.

In the preliminary/advisory poll, Øygard and Finnset were leading in votes, but Øygard won the first round of voting at the Church Council elections. In the final round of voting on 25 September 2014, between the top two candidates, Øygard received eight votes, and Finnset received seven. He became the third bishop created in the Church of Norway since the power to appoint bishops was transferred from the King to the Church Council. Øygard's election was announced at a press conference later that day, hosted by Church Council president Svein Arne Lindo. Introducing Øygard, Lindø said:

"The new bishop is a mild and generous person who knows the diocese he becomes a bishop in very well. The Church Council has, among other things, emphasized Øygard's long-standing priestly service in Finnmark—in recent years as a priest in Alta. It has given him valuable leadership experience. The poll results show that Øygard has solid support in the diocese. The Church of Norway gets a bishop who makes room for different opinions. He emphasizes that faith in Jesus Christ unites the Church. It is a very good starting point for the bishopric in a diocese of great ecclesiastical and cultural diversity."

Lindø also highlighted Øygard's knowledge of the Sami language, culture, and religious practices. Speaking at the conference, Øygard told the press that he felt honored and humbled to have been elected, saying, "At first I thought to myself if I was what the diocese needs. But when I saw that many wanted me during the negotiations, the desire to be a bishop emerged in me."

=== As bishop ===
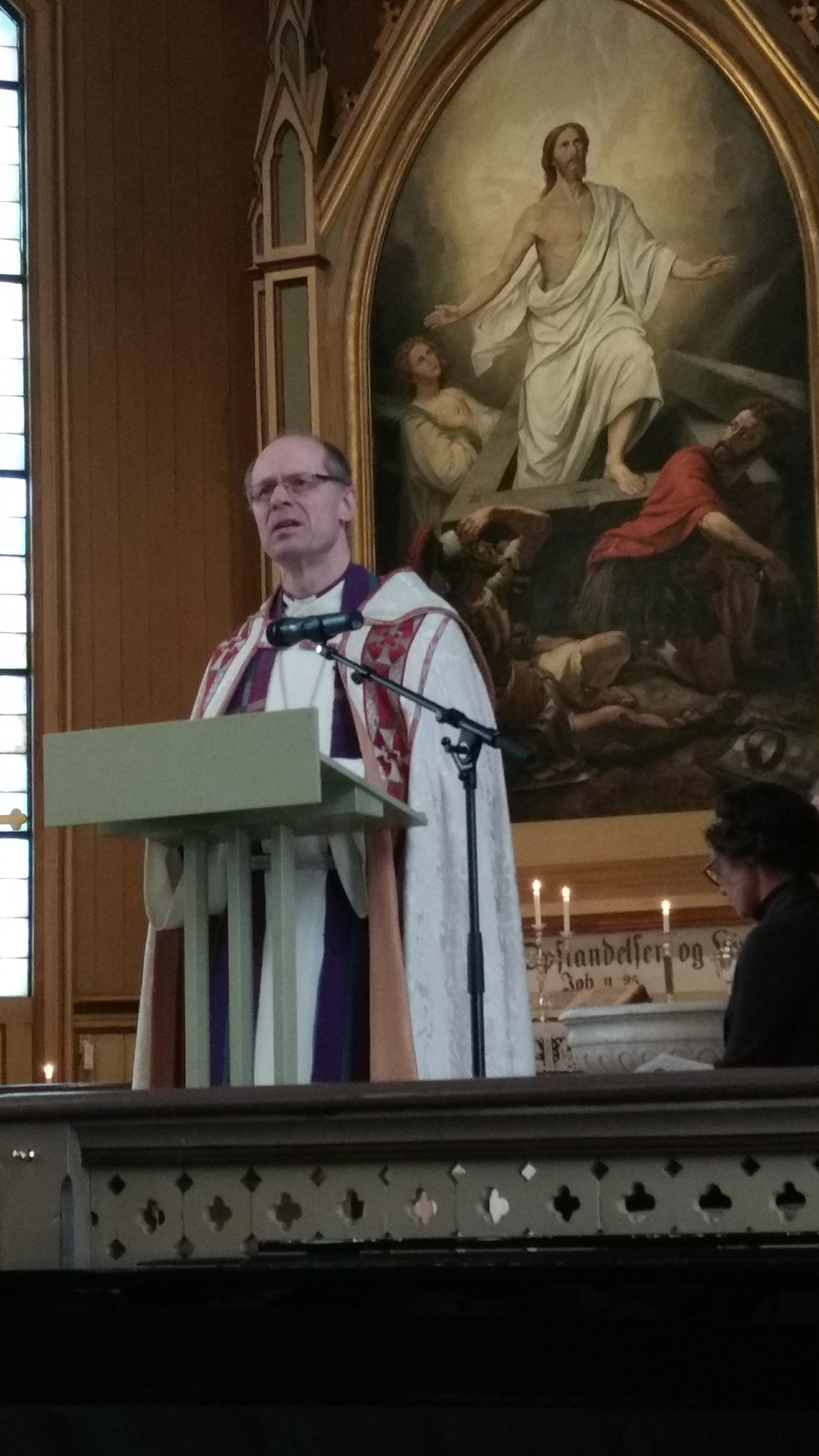
Bishop Øygard giving a sermon at the Tromsø Cathedral.

Øygard's episcopal ordination took place on 9 November 2014 at the Tromsø Cathedral.

Beginning on 1 January 2017, the state relieved itself of financial and other responsibilities for the Church of Norway. As a result, Øygard began overseeing the Diocese of Nord-Hålogaland's transition to fiscal independence. Speaking to the newspaper Harstad Tidende, Øygard said that although he was happy to see the achievement of separation of church and state, it was likely that the diocese would enter a period of financial difficulty, with the new responsibility of paying the salaries of 90 priests and 15 administrative employees. He said that as a result, the diocese would have to decrease the number of worship services and vacate about ten positions over the course of the year due to lack of funds.

== Views ==
When asked about his theology, Øygard has described himself as an "ordinary MF theologian" who is "about in the middle of the Church." He emphasizes that faith in Jesus Christ unites the Church, while still advocating tolerance for other views. On his Church of Norway profile during the bishops' elections in 2014, he described his views as follows:

"With my theology, I am keen to emphasize that our religion is linked to the belief in certain historical events, first and foremost the death and resurrection of Jesus. If we do not believe that this has happened, faith becomes meaningless. I certainly believe that the Bible also helps us in ethical questions, but realizes that it is difficult to give concrete ethical advice in a time that is so different from the time when the Bible revelation was given. I have a strong commitment to people with mental retardation. When the churches integrate mentally disabled people in a good way, this helps to strengthen a human view that values man because he is created by God and fellowship with him, and not of what human beings are capable of performing."

== Personal life ==
Øygard is married.

== See also ==
Church of Norway titles
Preceded by Per Oskar Kjølaas	Bishop of the Diocese of Nord-Hålogaland; 2014–present	Incumbent
