= Arvid Nergård =

Norwegian bishop

Arvid Halgeir Nergård
- Bishop
- Church: Church of Norway
- Diocese: Nord-Hålogaland
- In office: 1979–1990

Personal details
- Born: 11 April 1923 Lenvik, Norway
- Died: 23 November 2006 (aged 83) Larvik, Norway
- Denomination: Christian
- Occupation: Priest
- Education: Cand.theol. (1952)
- Alma mater: University of Oslo

Arvid Halgeir Nergård (11 April 1923 – 23 November 2006) was a Norwegian bishop in the Church of Norway.

He was born in Lenvik Municipality, Norway in 1923. He received a degree in agronomy in 1943 and the cand.theol. degree in 1952. He served as curate in Sør-Varanger Municipality from 1957–1961, vicar in Tana Municipality from 1961–1966, vicar in Vadsø Municipality from 1966–1969, and vicar in Molde Municipality from 1969–1974. From 1974 to 1979 he was dean of the Ytre Romsdal prosti, and from 1979-1990 he was the bishop of the Diocese of Nord-Hålogaland. He died in 2006.

Church of Norway titles
Preceded by Kristen Kyrre Bremer	Bishop of Nord-Hålogaland; 1979–1990	Succeeded by Ola M. Steinholt
