= Per Oskar Kjølaas =

Norwegian bishop

The Right Reverend Per Oskar Kjølaas
- Bishop Emeritus of Nord-Hålogaland
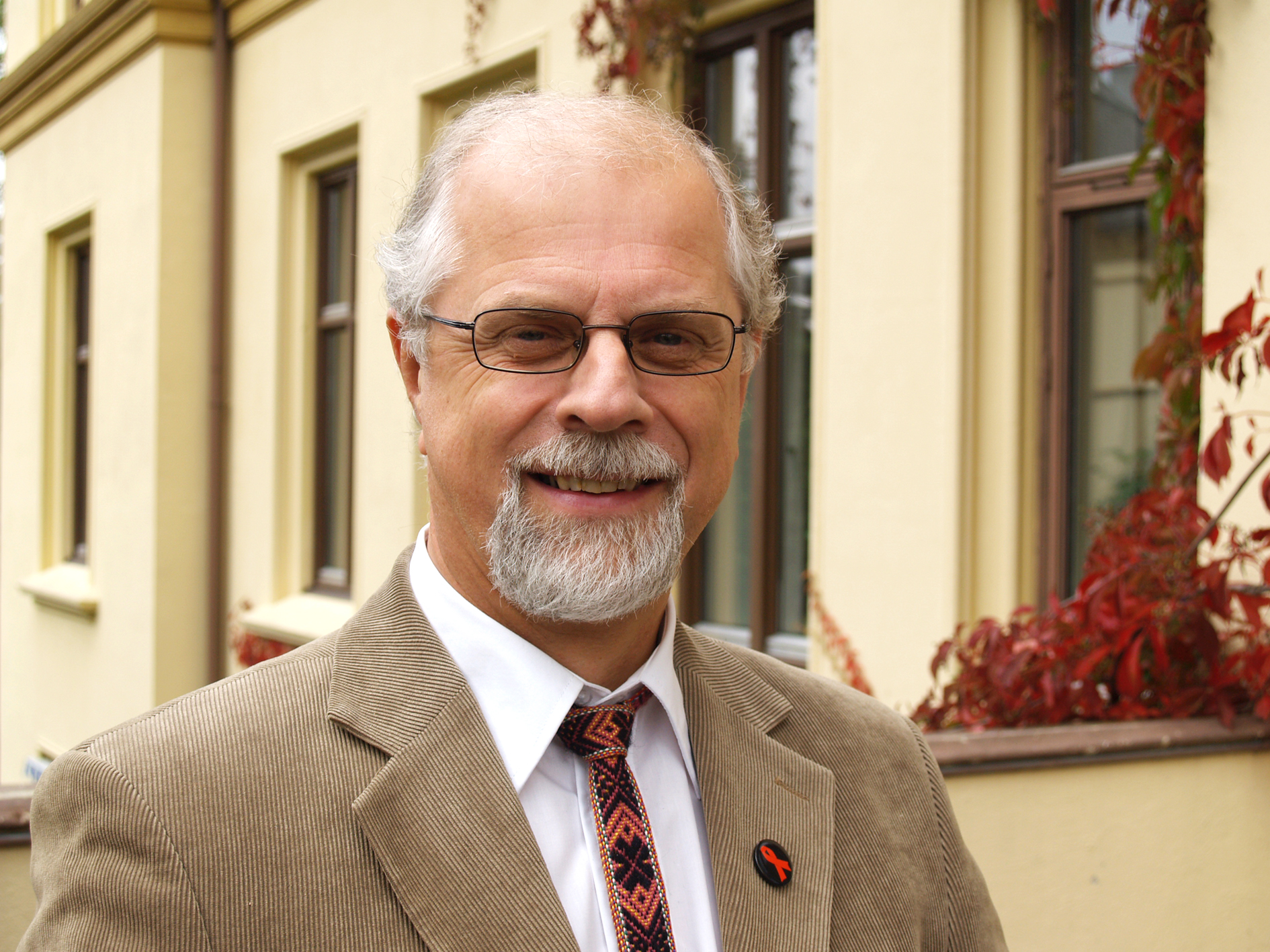
- (Photo: Kirkens informasjonstjeneste)
- Church: Church of Norway
- Diocese: Nord-Hålogaland
- In office: 2002–2014

Personal details
- Born: 25 May 1948 (age 78) Kirkenes, Norway
- Denomination: Christian
- Occupation: Priest
- Education: Cand.theol. (1974)
- Alma mater: MF Norwegian School of Theology

Per Oskar Alfred Kjølaas (born 25 May 1948 in Kirkenes, Norway) was the bishop of the Diocese of Nord-Hålogaland in the Church of Norway from 2002 until 2014.

Kjølaas studied at the MF Norwegian School of Theology in Oslo, having graduated with a cand.theol. degree in 1974, but also holds a certificate in Sami Language and Culture from the University of Oslo (1984, Minor in Sami Language and Culture).

He worked as a minister in northern Norway (Sortland Municipality, Kautokeino Municipality, and Karasjok Municipality), serving both as a vicar, rector/priest, and provost. He has also worked as a secretary to the bishop (Diocesan vicar) and held various positions as an educator and translator of the Bible into Sami languages.

Kjølaas was consecrated as a bishop in 2002 and served in that capacity until his retirement in 2014.

Church of Norway titles
Preceded by Ola Steinholt	Bishop of Diocese of Nord-Hålogaland; 2002–2014	Succeeded by Olav Øygard
