= Kristen Kyrre Bremer =

Norwegian theologian and bishop

The Right reverend Kristen Kyrre Bremer
- Bishop
- Church: Church of Norway
- Diocese: Nord-Hålogaland (1972-1979); Nidaros (1979-1991)

Orders
- Ordination: 1953

Personal details
- Born: 12 July 1925 Tana, Norway
- Died: 16 May 2013 (aged 87) Rygge, Norway
- Denomination: Lutheran
- Occupation: Priest
- Education: University of Oslo (Cand.theol. (1953))

Kristen Kyrre Bremer (12 July 1925 – 16 May 2013) was a Norwegian theologian and bishop in the Church of Norway.

== Education and career ==
Bremer was born in Tana Municipality in Finnmark county, Norway in 1925. Bremer received his cand.theol. degree in 1953 in the Faculty of Theology at the University of Oslo. He was ordained as a priest in 1953. His began his ministry as a Military Chaplain for the brigade in northern Norway from 1953 to 1956. He then was the assistant pastor in Nord-Fron Municipality from 1956 to 1960, a military chaplain in Gaza from 1960–1965. He served as vicar at Bardu Church from 1965–1969, dean of Senja prosti from 1969–1972, bishop of the Diocese of Nord-Hålogaland from 1972–1979, and bishop of the Diocese of Nidaros from 1979 until his retirement in 1991.

Church of Norway titles
Preceded by Monrad Norderval	Bishop of Nord-Hålogaland; 1972–1979	Succeeded by Arvid Nergård
Preceded by Tord Godal	Bishop of Nidaros; 1979–1991	Succeeded by Finn Wagle
