= Monrad Norderval =

Norwegian bishop

Monrad Oskar Norderval
- Bishop
- Church: Church of Norway
- Diocese: Diocese of Nord-Hålogaland
- In office: 1961–1972

Orders
- Ordination: 27 June 1929 by Eivind Berggrav

Personal details
- Born: 28 January 1902 Ålesund, Norway
- Died: 24 December 1976 (aged 74) Ålesund, Norway
- Denomination: Christian
- Spouse: Oddlaug Liavaag
- Occupation: Priest
- Education: Cand.theol. (1928)
- Alma mater: Royal Frederick University

Monrad Oskar Norderval (1902–1976) was a Norwegian bishop in the Church of Norway.

Norderval was born in Ålesund, Norway in 1902. He graduated with the cand.theol. degree in 1928 from the Royal Frederick University in Oslo. He began his ministry as an assistant pastor in Skjervøy Municipality in 1929. He then served as vicar in Tana Municipality from 1929–1935, in Ørsta Municipality from 1935–1948, Ålesund Municipality from 1948–1961, and was the bishop of the Diocese of Nord-Hålogaland from 1961–1972. He also published poems, essay collections, and memoirs. He died in Ålesund in 1976.

He was one of the founders of the human rights organization Mission Behind the Iron Curtain, a precursor to Stefanus Alliance International.

Church of Norway titles
Preceded by Alf Wiig	Bishop of Nord-Hålogaland; 1961–1972	Succeeded by Kristen Kyrre Bremer
