= Cathedral of Our Lady, Tromsø =

Coordinates: 69.6517°N 18.9569°E

Cathedral of Our Lady
- Vår Frue domkirke
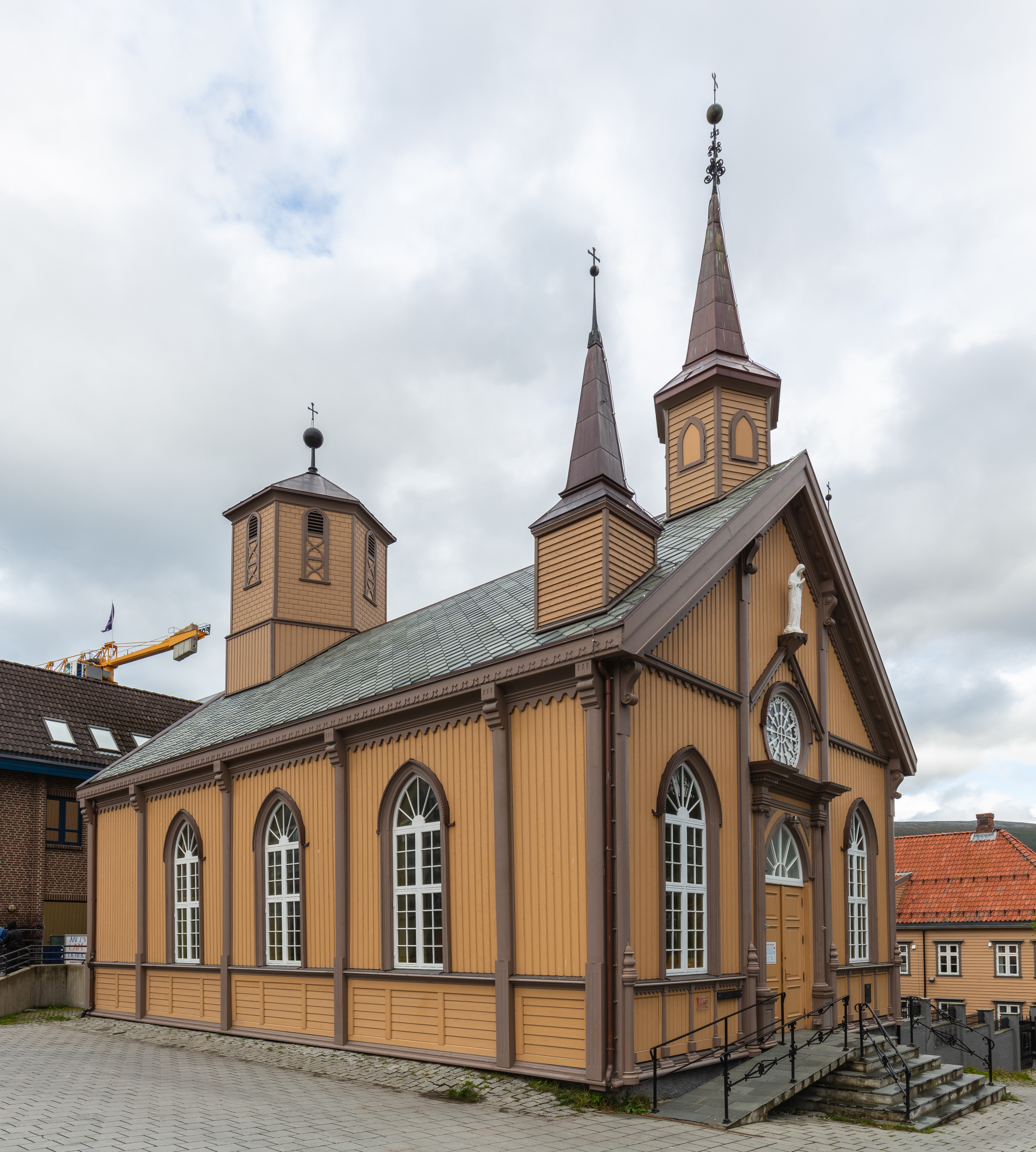
- Cathedral of Our Lady
- Location: Tromsø
- Country: Norway
- Denomination: Roman Catholic Church

The Cathedral of Our Lady (Norwegian: Vår Frue domkirke), also commonly known as the Church of Our Lady, is the Catholic cathedral of the city of Tromsø, Norway, and seat of the prelature of the same name. It is the northernmost Catholic (and Christian in general) cathedral in the world. It is located on the Erling Bangsunds square.

== Description ==
It is a small wooden church with room for about 150 seats. It was begun the same year as the Lutheran Cathedral of the city, in 1861, and shares with it the neogothic artistic style. It also has three small towers on the main facade and a larger tower over the choir. While the exterior has remained virtually unchanged since 1861, the interior has been modified on more than one occasion; Now the interior is simple and painted in light colors, as was the wish of Bishop Gerhard Goebel, vicar of Tromsø in the 1970s.

Next to the church is the parochial house, which was until 1967 the Catholic school of Tromsø. Currently there are celebrations and social gatherings of the Catholic community. In the square known as Stortorget is the episcopal residence, an empire style building from 1832, where Pope John Paul II slept during his visit to Tromsø in June 1989.

== See also ==
- Roman Catholicism in Norway
- Our Lady

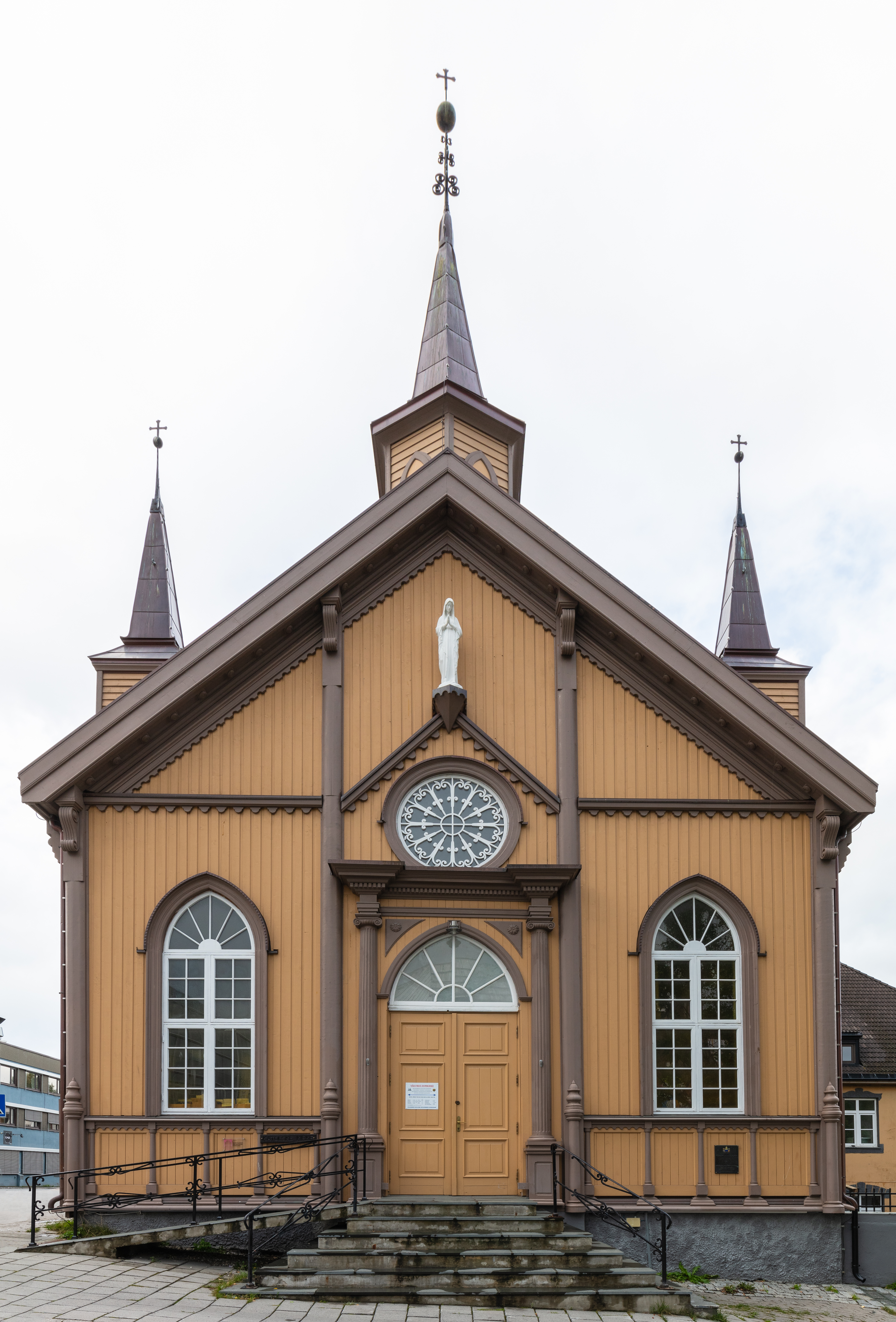
Facade
