= Tromsø Cathedral =

- Tromsø domkirke
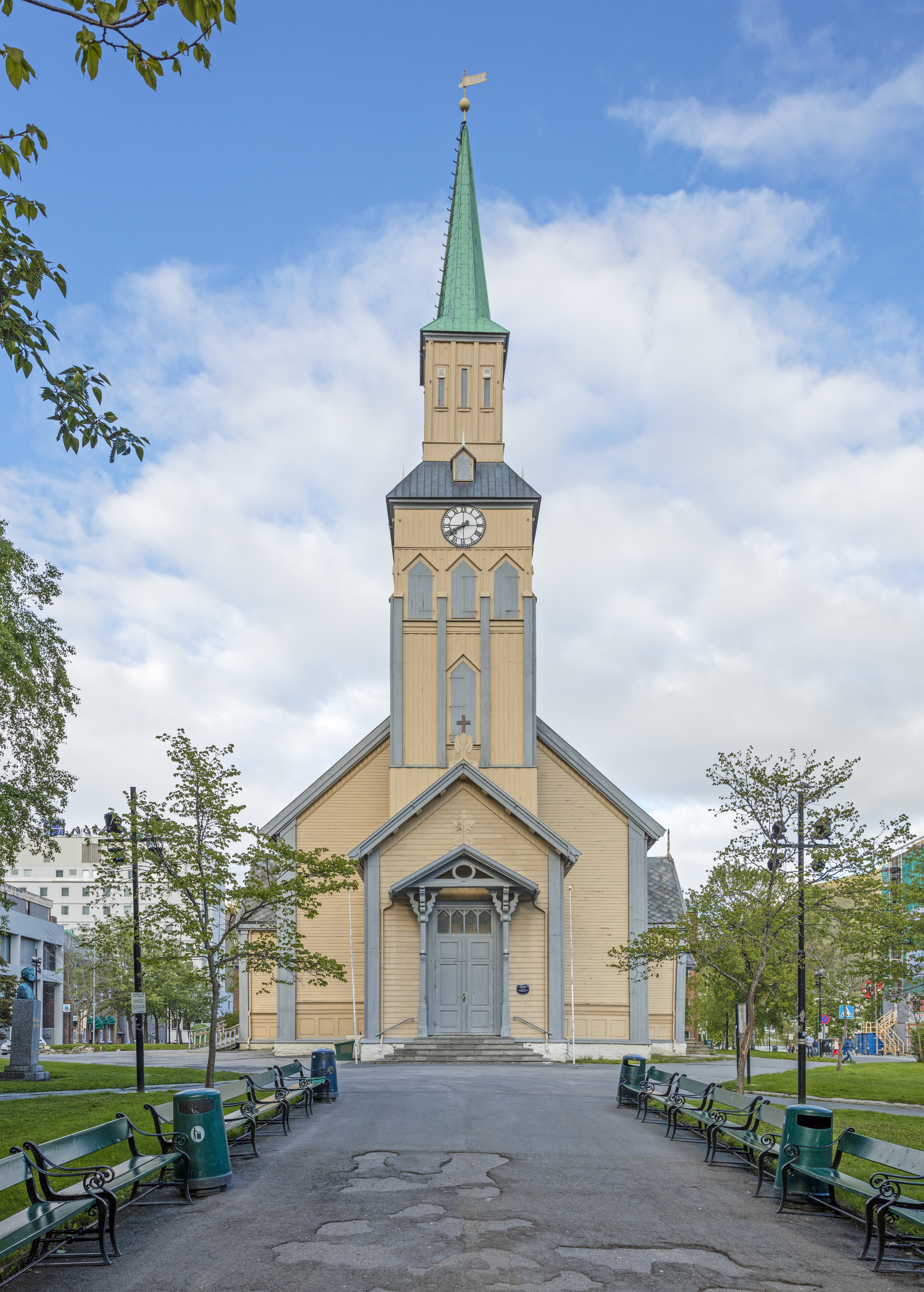
- View of Tromsø Cathedral as seen from Kirkeparken
- Tromsø Cathedral
- 69.648737°N 18.956756°E
- Location: Tromsø, Troms
- Country: Norway
- Denomination: Church of Norway
- Churchmanship: Evangelical Lutheran

History
- Status: Cathedral
- Founded: 1252

Architecture
- Functional status: Active
- Architect: Christian Heinrich Grosch
- Architectural type: Long church
- Style: Gothic Revival
- Completed: 1861 (165 years ago)

Specifications
- Capacity: 618
- Materials: Wood

Administration
- Diocese: Nord-Hålogaland
- Deanery: Tromsø domprosti
- Parish: Tromsø domkirken
- Norwegian Cultural Heritage Site
- Type: Church
- Status: Listed
- ID: 85670

Tromsø Cathedral (Norwegian: Tromsø domkirke) is a cathedral of the Church of Norway located in the city of Tromsø in Tromsø Municipality in Troms county, Norway. The cathedral is the church for the Tromsø Domkirkens parish. It is the headquarters for the Tromsø domprosti (arch-deanery) and the Diocese of Nord-Hålogaland. This cathedral is notable since it is the only Norwegian Protestant cathedral made of wood.

The yellow, wooden cathedral was built in a long church format and the Gothic Revival style in 1861 by the architect Christian Heinrich Grosch. The church tower and main entrance are on the west front. It is probably the northernmost Protestant cathedral in the world. With over 600 seats, it is one of Norway's most significant wooden churches. It initially held about 984 seats, but many benches and seats have been removed over the years to make room for tables in the back of the church.

== History ==
The structure was completed in 1861 after the diocese was established in 1844. Christian Heinrich Grosch was the architect. It was built using a cog joint method. It is situated in the middle of the city of Tromsø (on the island of Tromsøya) on a site where in all likelihood, there has been a church since the 13th century.

The first church in Tromsø was built in 1252 by King Haakon IV as a royal chapel. It belonged to the king, therefore, not the Catholic Church. This church is mentioned several times in the Middle Ages as "St. Mary's near the Heathens" (Sanctae Mariae juxta Pagano).

Not much is known about the previous churches on the site, but it is known that in 1711 a new church was built on this site. That church was replaced in 1803. That church was moved out of the city in 1860 to make way for the building of the present cathedral. The 1803 church building was relocated to an area a few hundred metres south of the city boundary. Then in the early 1970s, it was moved again to the present Elverhøy Church site further up the city’s hills. This church is still there and contains several pieces of art that have adorned the churches in Tromsø from the Middle Ages, the oldest of which is a figure of the Madonna, possibly from the 15th century.

The present cathedral was consecrated on 1 December 1861 by Bishop Carl Peter Essendrop. In 1862, the bell tower was completed, and the bell was installed. All of the interior decorations and art were constructed in the 1880s. The cathedral cost about 10,000 Speciedalers to build.

== Interior ==
The cathedral interior is dominated by the altar with a copy of the painting Resurrection by the noted artist Adolph Tidemand, while the original painting is located in the Bragernes Church in Drammen. Under the painting, there is a quote from the Gospel of John in Norwegian meaning "I am the resurrection and the life". The altar board was completed in 1884 by Christian Brun. Stained glass windows in the front of the church, designed by Gustav Vigeland, were installed in 1960.

The cathedral has two organs. The newest fully-electric organ was built in 2017 and inaugurated on 11 June 2017. It is a Mühleisen organ from Leonberg, Germany. The oldest mechanical organ located at the gallery was built in 1863 by Claus Jensen and restored in 2013–2014.

== Media gallery ==
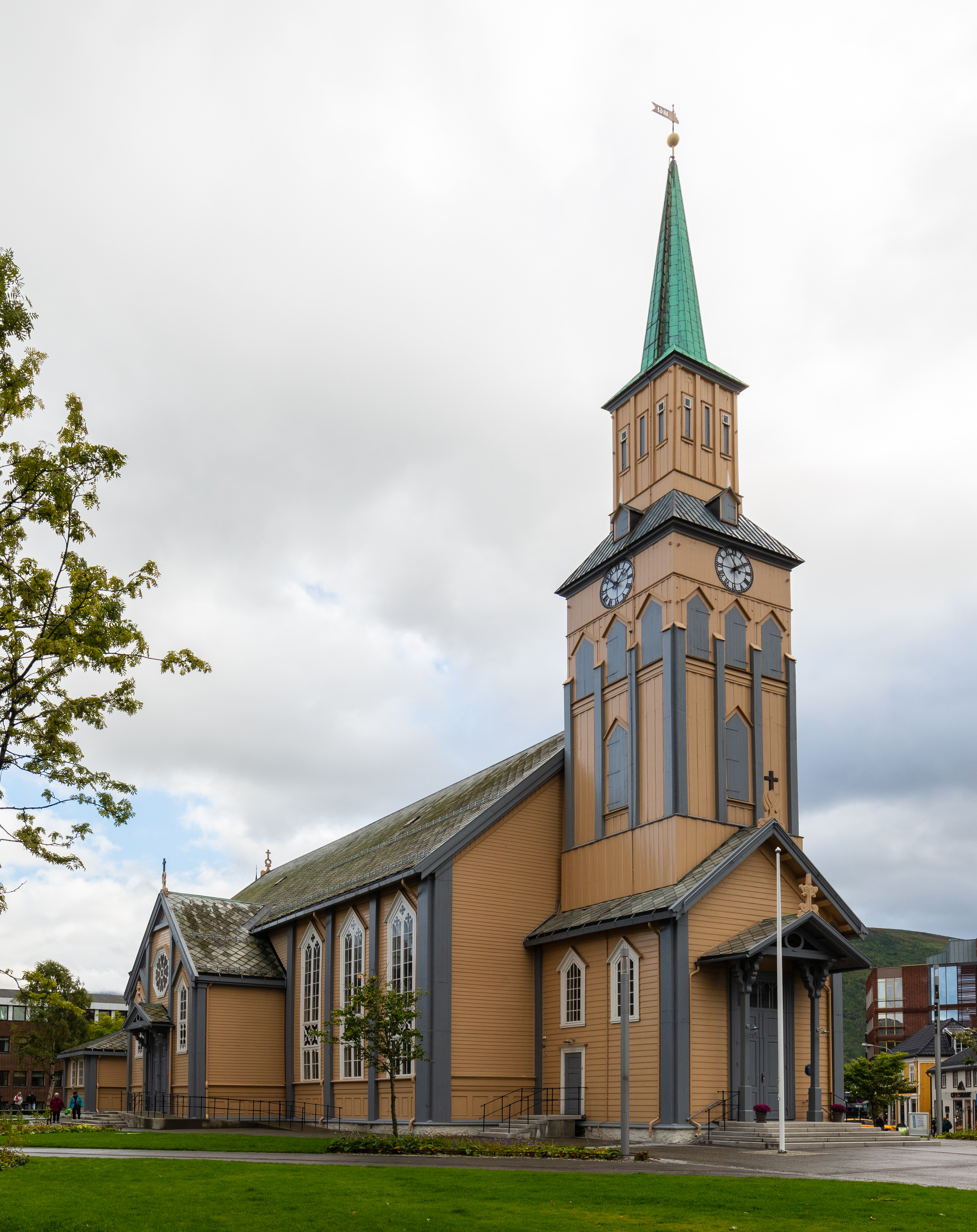

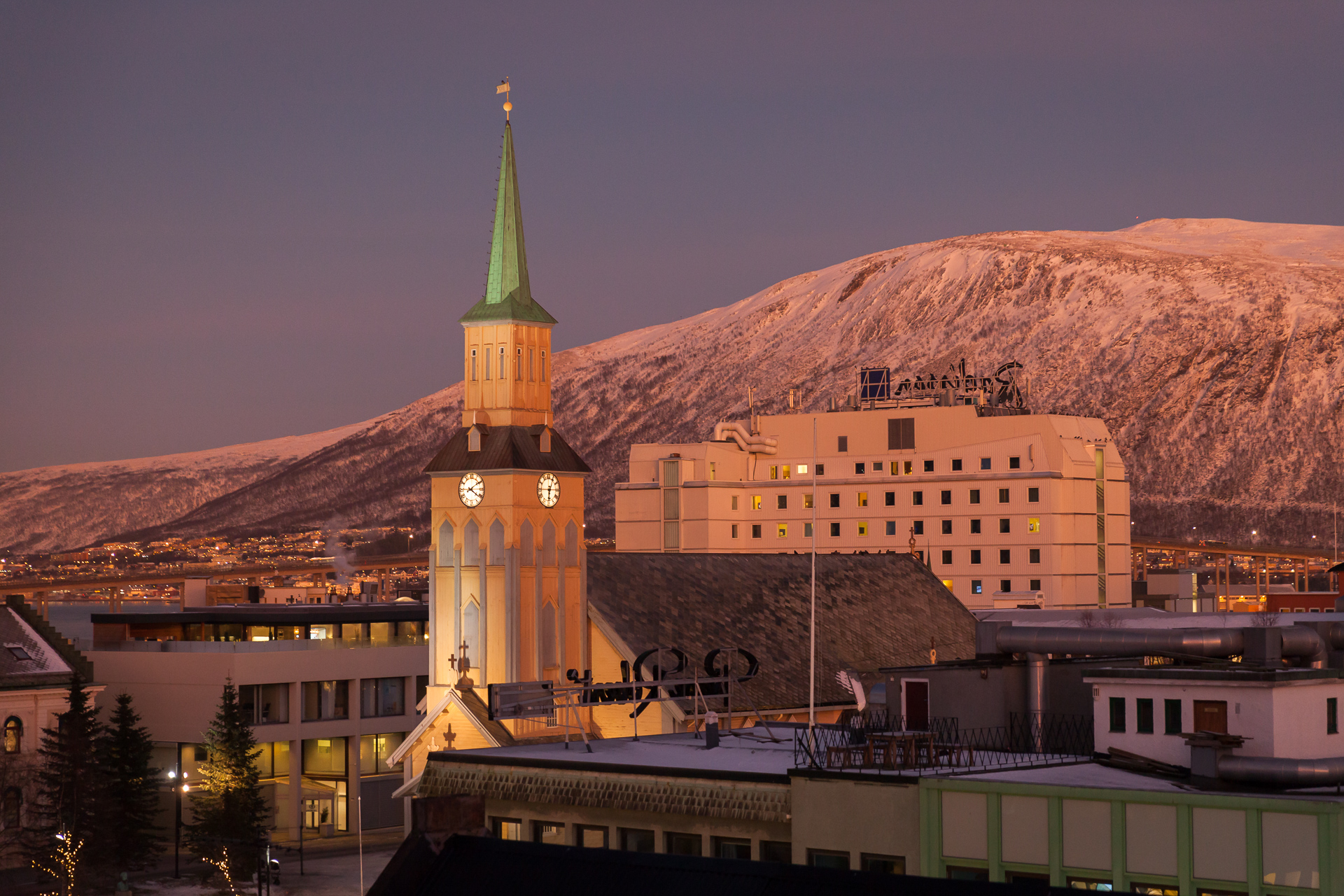

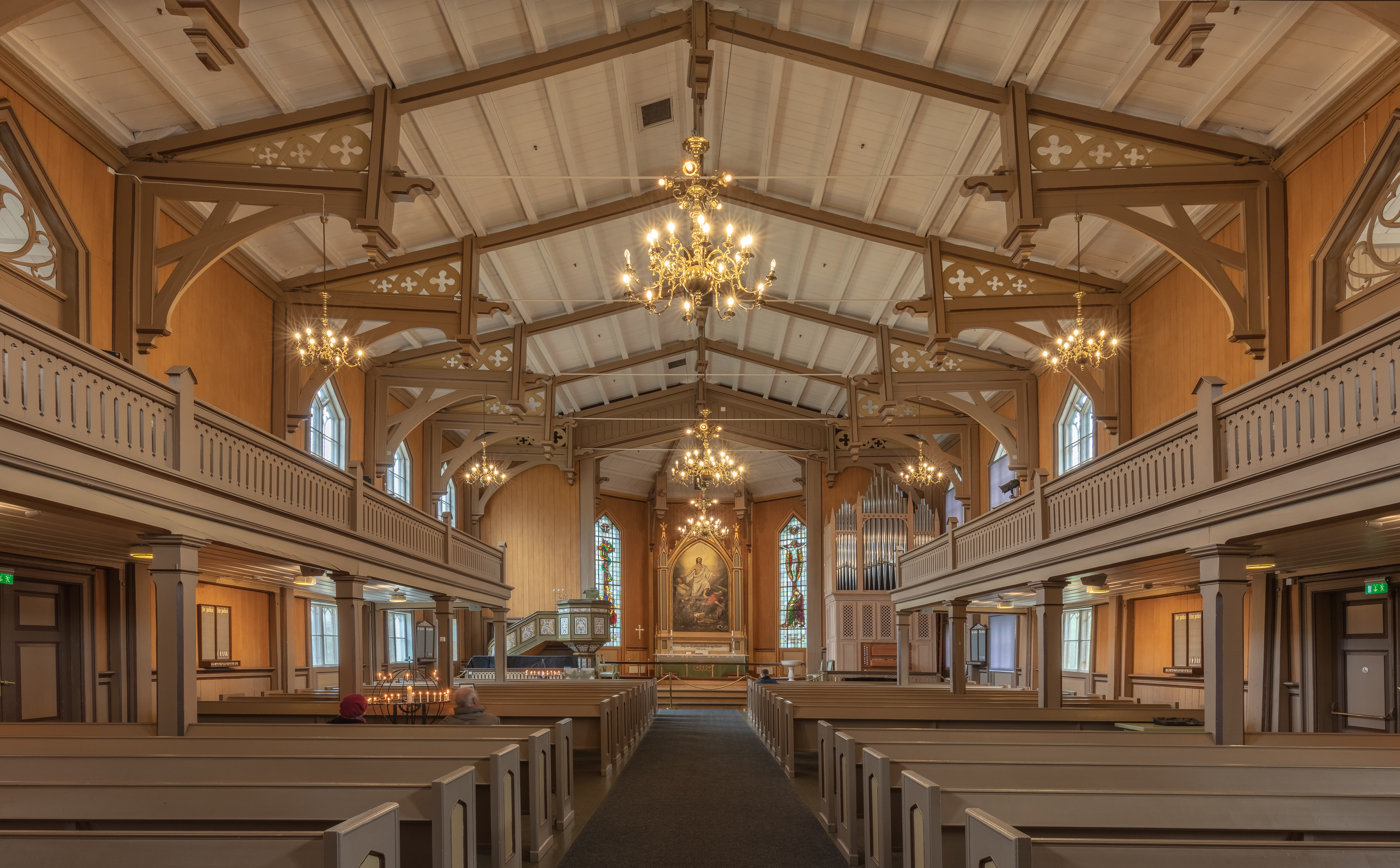

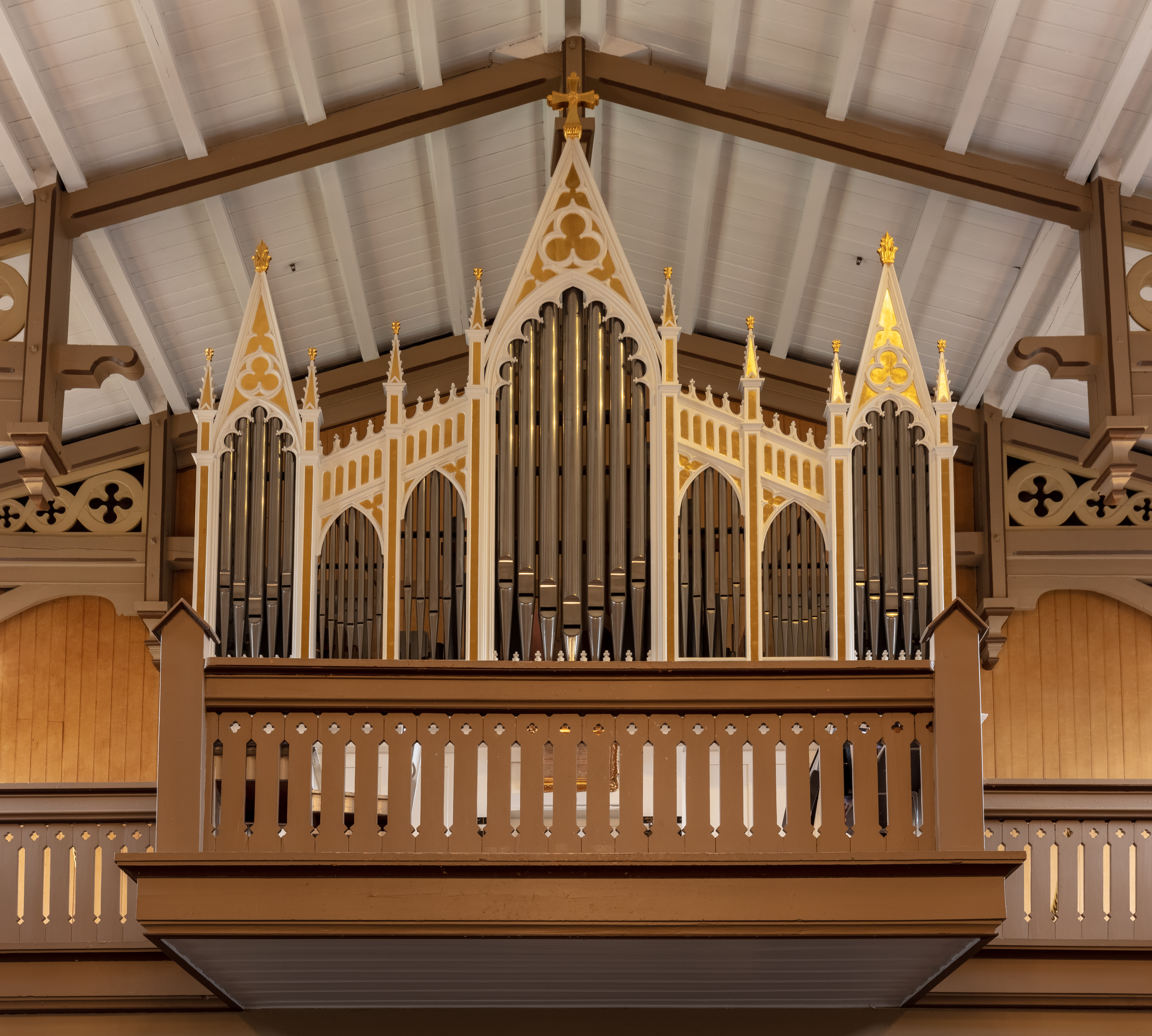

== See also ==
- List of churches in Nord-Hålogaland
- Arctic Cathedral - another church in Tromsø, noted for its architecture.
- Cathedral of Our Lady, Tromsø - Catholic cathedral.
