= Diocese of Nord-Hålogaland =

Diocese in the Church of Norway

Coordinates: 69.6°N 19.5°E

Diocese of Nord-Hålogaland Nord-Hålogaland bispedomme
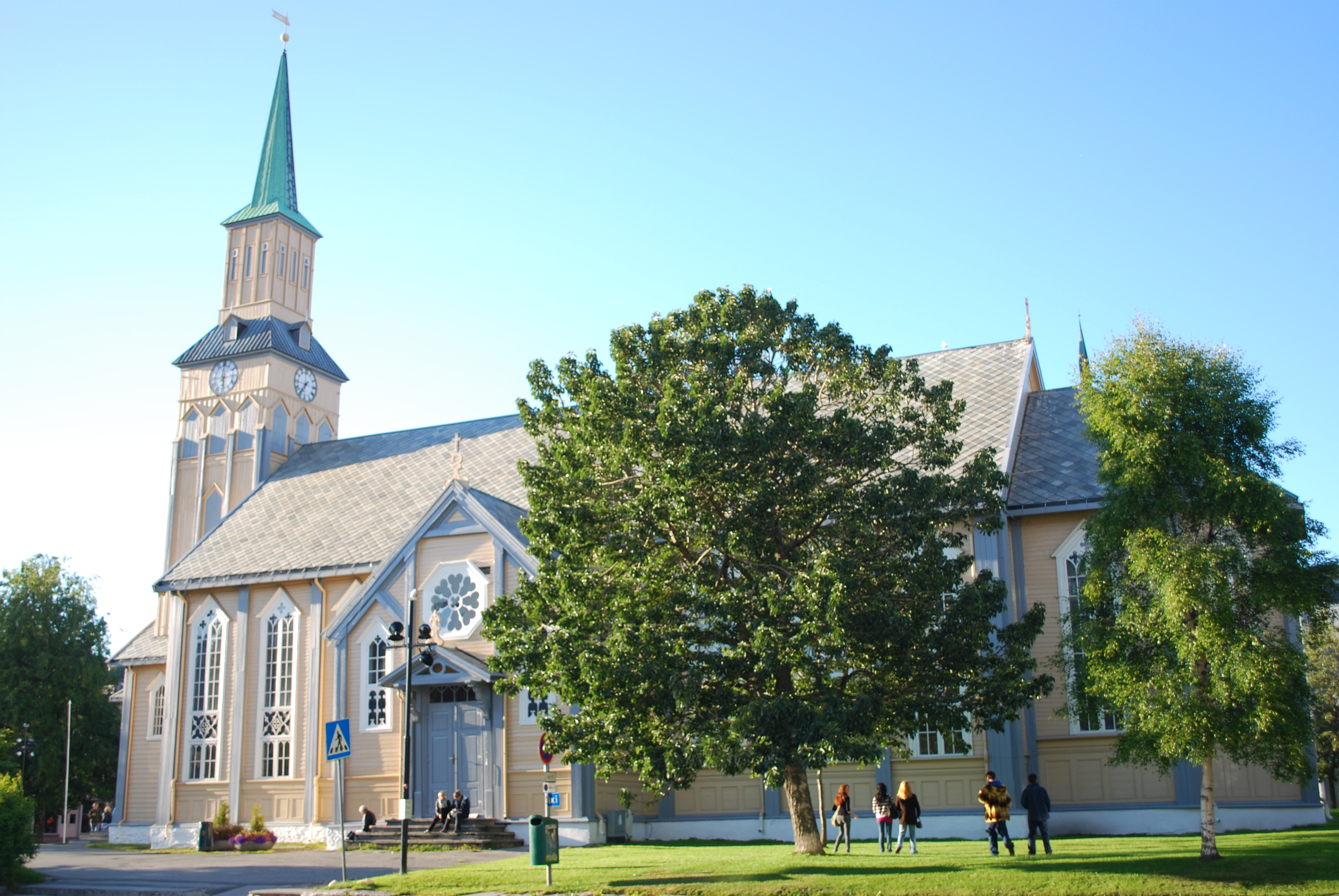
- View of the Tromsø Cathedral

Location
- Country: Norway
- Territory: Troms and Finnmark
- Deaneries: Tromsø domprosti, Alta, Hammerfest, Indre Finnmark, Indre Troms, Nord-Troms, Senja, Trondenes, Varanger

Statistics
- Parishes: 66
- Members: 190,926

Information
- Denomination: Church of Norway
- Established: 1952
- Cathedral: Tromsø Cathedral

Current leadership
- Bishop: Olav Øygard (current); Stig Lægdene (upcoming)

Map
- Location of the Diocese of Nord-Hålogaland

Website
- http://www.kirken.no/nord-haalogaland

Nord-Hålogaland (Norwegian: Nord-Hålogaland bispedømme) is a diocese in the Church of Norway. It covers the Church of Norway churches in Troms and Finnmark counties as well as in the territory of Svalbard. The diocese is seated in the city of Tromsø at the Tromsø Cathedral, the seat of the presiding bishop. After bishop Olav Øygard announced his plans to retire in august 2025, a process to elect a new bishop has been started. In September it was announced, that Stig Lægdene will succeed Øygard and become the 8th bishop of Nord-Hålogaland. Lægdene will be formally appointed as bishop at December 7th 2025 at the Tromsø Cathedral.

== History ==
Originally, this area was a part of the great Diocese of Nidaros, which covered all of Northern Norway from Romsdalen and north (Finnmark, Troms, and Nordland counties). On 30 December 1803, the King of Norway named Peder Olivarius Bugge the "Bishop of Trondheim and Romsdal" and also named Mathias Bonsach Krogh the "Bishop of Nordland and Finnmark", thus essentially splitting the diocese into two starting in 1804, although legally it was one diocese with two bishops. The newly appointed Bishop Krogh (in 1804) made Alstahaug Church the seat of his bishopric in the north, while Bishop Bugge stayed in Trondheim. The new diocese was legally created on 14 June 1844 as Tromsø stift and it was to be seated in the city of Tromsø. The new Tromsø Cathedral was completed in 1864. The name of the diocese was changed to Hålogaland bispedømme in 1918. When Svalbard became part of Norway in 1920, it also became a part of this diocese. In 1952, the Diocese of Hålogaland was split into two: the Diocese of Sør-Hålogaland (Nordland county) and the Diocese of Nord-Hålogaland (Troms, Finnmark, and Svalbard).

== Bishops ==
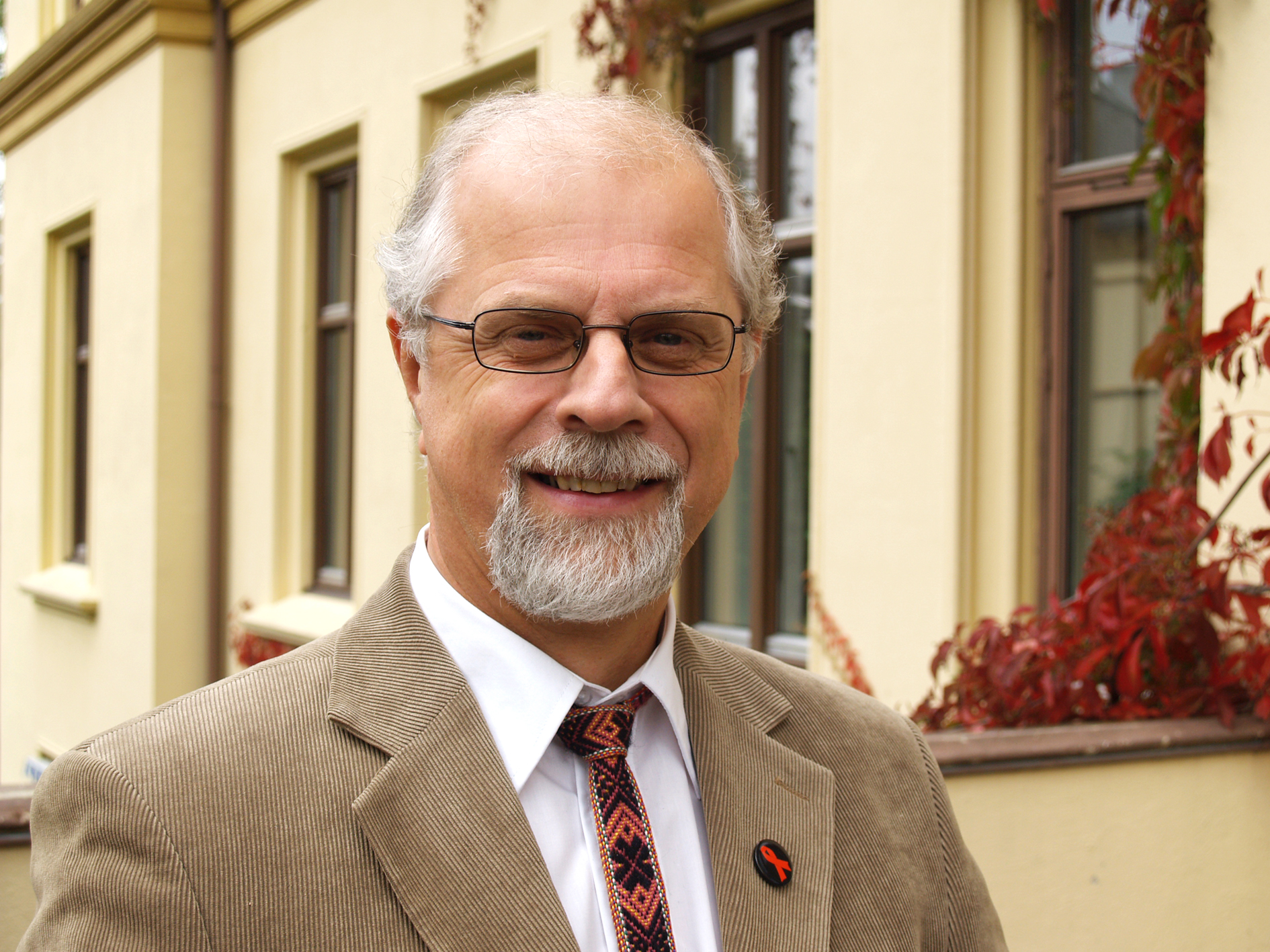
Former Bishop Per Oskar Kjølaas

The Bishops of the Diocese of Nord-Hålogaland since its creation in 1952 when the old Diocese of Hålogaland was divided into two:

- 1952-1961: Alf Wiig
- 1962-1972: Monrad Norderval
- 1972-1979: Kristen Kyrre Bremer
- 1979-1990: Arvid Nergård
- 1990-2001: Ola Steinholt
- 2002-2014: Per Oskar Kjølaas
- 2014-2025: Olav Øygard
- since 2025: Stig Lægdene

== Cathedral ==
Construction of the new Tromsø Cathedral began in 1861. It was designed by architect Christian Heinrich Grosch. The cathedral was built of wood in Neo-Gothic style. The interior is dominated by the altar, a copy of the Resurrection by Adolph Tidemand.

== Structure ==
The Diocese of Nord-Hålogaland is divided into nine deaneries (Norwegian: prosti). Each one corresponds to several municipalities in the diocese. Each municipality is further divided into one or more parishes which each contain one or more congregations. See each municipality below for lists of churches and parishes within them.

Deanery (prosti)	Municipalities
Tromsø domprosti	Tromsø, Karlsøy, Svalbard
Alta prosti	Alta, Hasvik, Loppa
Hammerfest prosti	Gamvik, Hammerfest, Lebesby, Måsøy, Nordkapp
Indre Finnmark prosti	Karasjok, Kautokeino, Nesseby, Tana, Porsanger
Indre Troms prosti	Balsfjord, Bardu, Lavangen, Målselv, Salangen
Nord-Troms prosti	Kvænangen, Kåfjord, Lyngen, Nordreisa, Skjervøy, Storfjord
Senja prosti	Dyrøy, Senja, Sørreisa
Trondenes prosti	Gratangen, Harstad, Ibestad, Kvæfjord, Tjeldsund
Varanger prosti	Berlevåg, Båtsfjord, Sør-Varanger, Vadsø, Vardø

== Media gallery ==
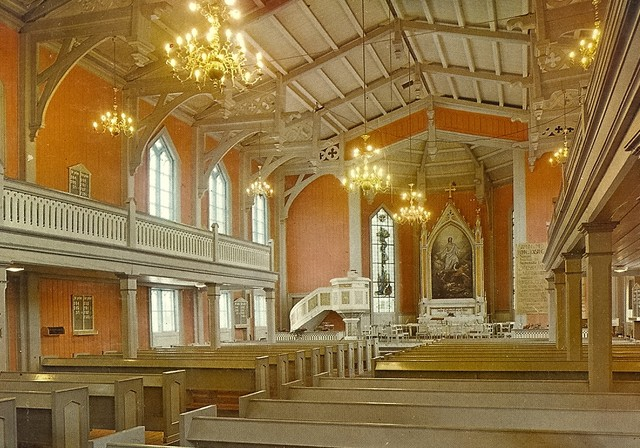
Interior
Tromsø Cathedral

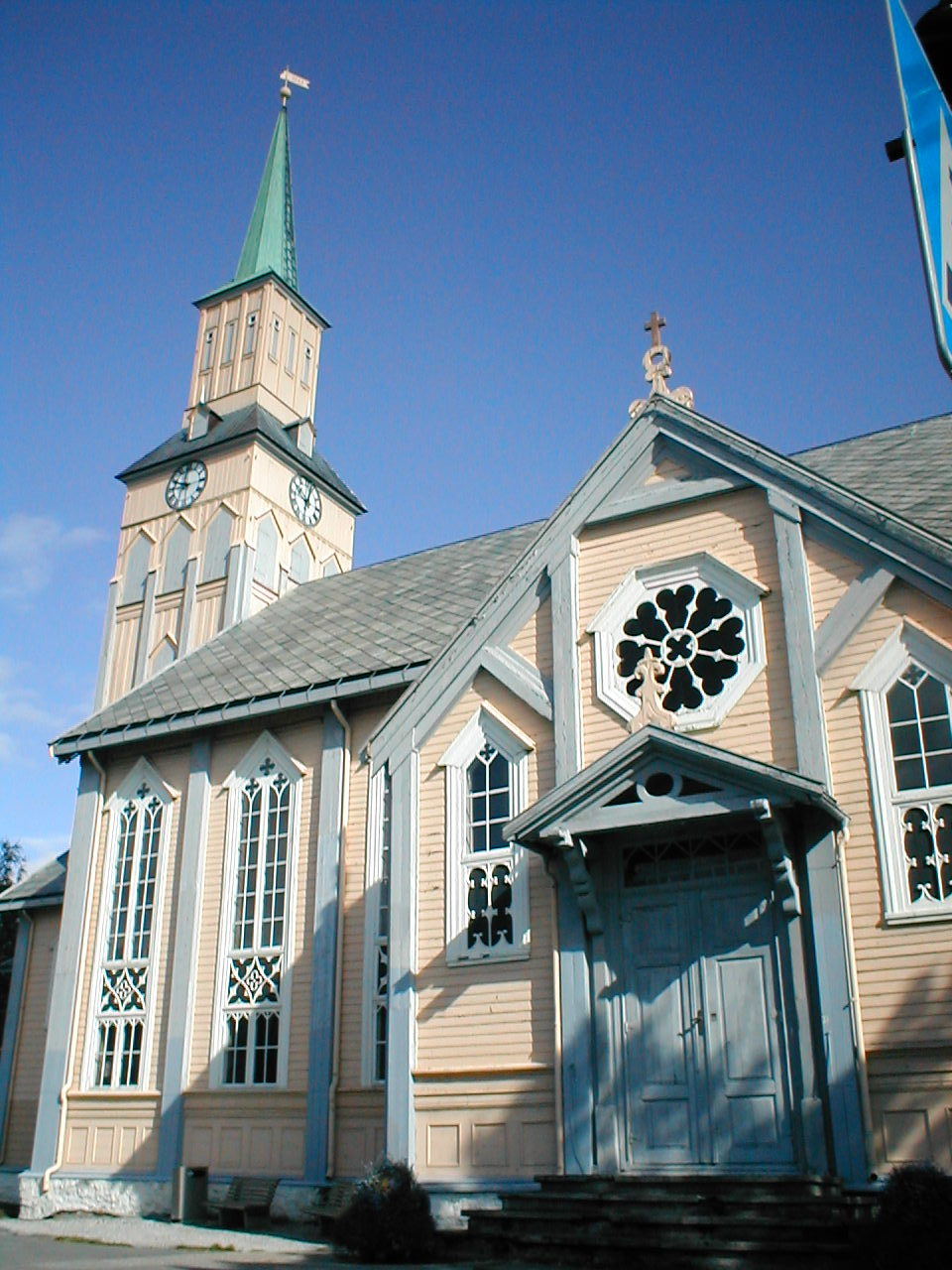
Side entrance
Tromsø Cathedral

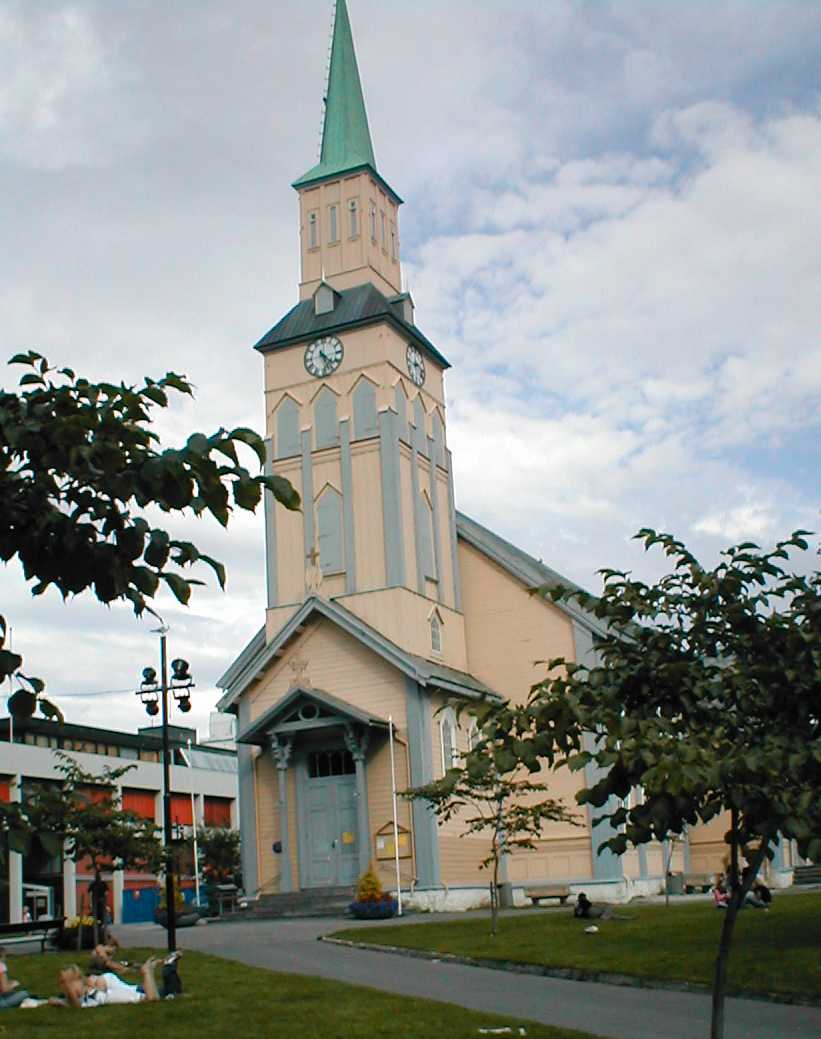
Front
Tromsø Cathedral
