= Erdal Church =

Church in Vestland, Norway

- Erdal kirke
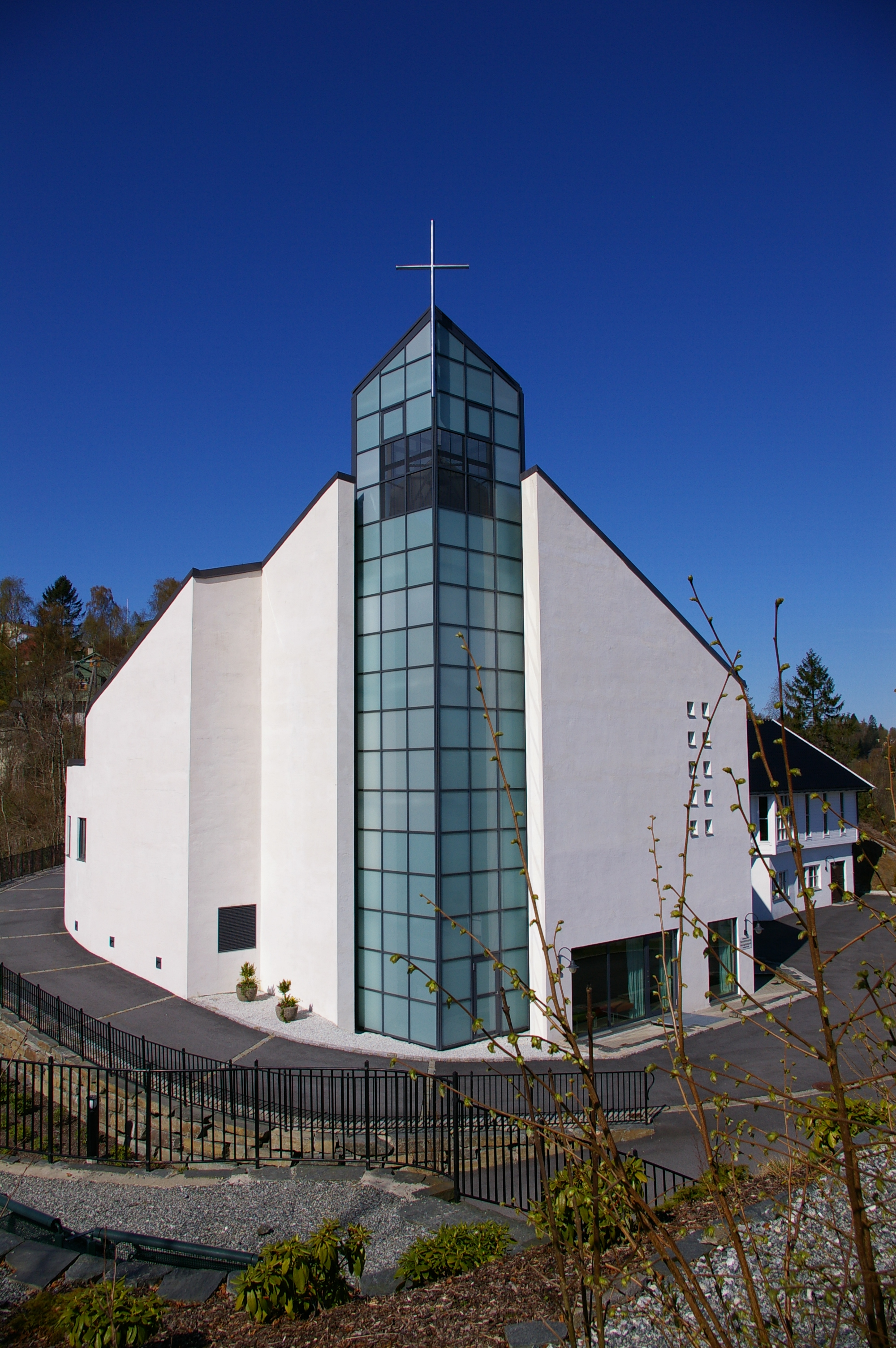
- View of the church
- Erdal Church
- 60°26′21″N 5°13′41″E
- Location: Askøy Municipality, Vestland
- Country: Norway
- Denomination: Church of Norway
- Churchmanship: Evangelical Lutheran

History
- Status: Parish church
- Founded: 1995
- Consecrated: 1995
- Events: 2006: large addition

Architecture
- Functional status: Active
- Architect: Jostein Tveit
- Architectural type: Long church
- Completed: 1995 (31 years ago)

Specifications
- Capacity: 500
- Materials: Concrete

Administration
- Diocese: Bjørgvin bispedømme
- Deanery: Vesthordland prosti
- Parish: Erdal

Erdal Church (Norwegian: Erdal kirke) is a parish church of the Church of Norway in Askøy Municipality in Vestland county, Norway. It is located in the village of Erdal. It is the church for the Erdal parish which is part of the Vesthordland prosti (deanery) in the Diocese of Bjørgvin. The concrete and glass church was built in a long church design in 1995 using plans drawn up by the architect Jostein Tveit. The church seats about 500 people.

== History ==
The church was built in 1995 by the architect Jostein Tveit. The original church was small (seating about 160 people) and it was meant to be an interim church that could be used while funds were raised and plans made for expanding the building to a full church. The interim church was consecrated on 12 February 1995 by the Bishop Ole D. Hagesæther. In 2006, the church addition was completed, vastly expanding the building. The present church is about 860 square metres (9,300 sq ft) and it can seat about 500 people. The new addition was consecrated on 3 September 2006.

== Media gallery ==
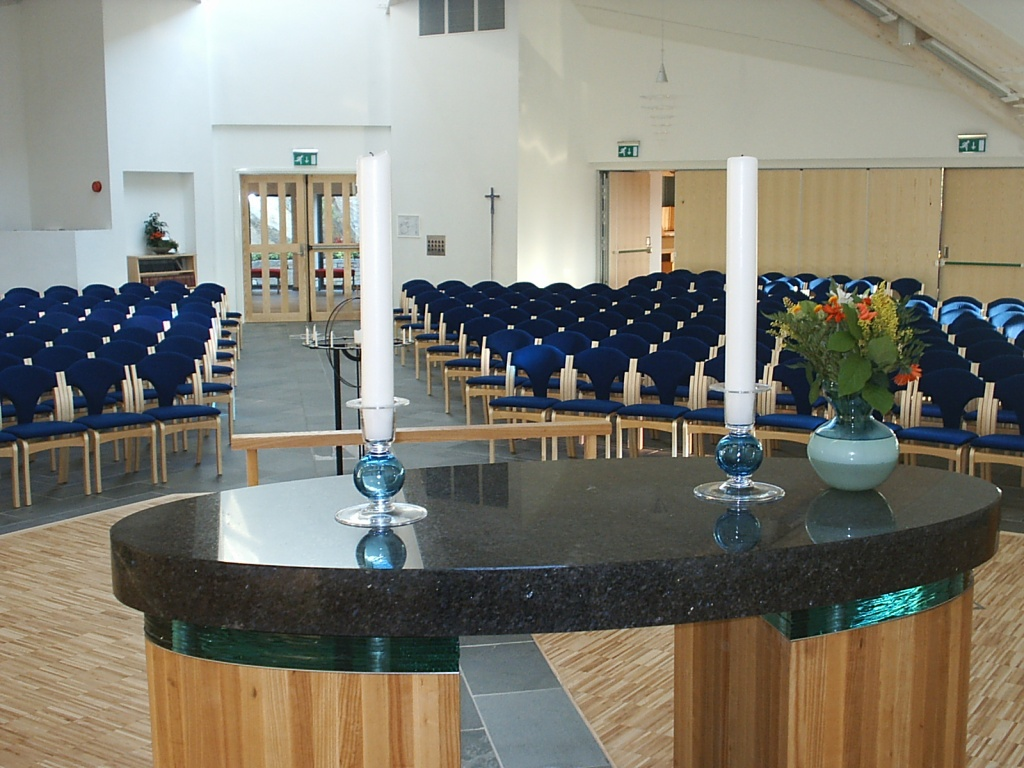

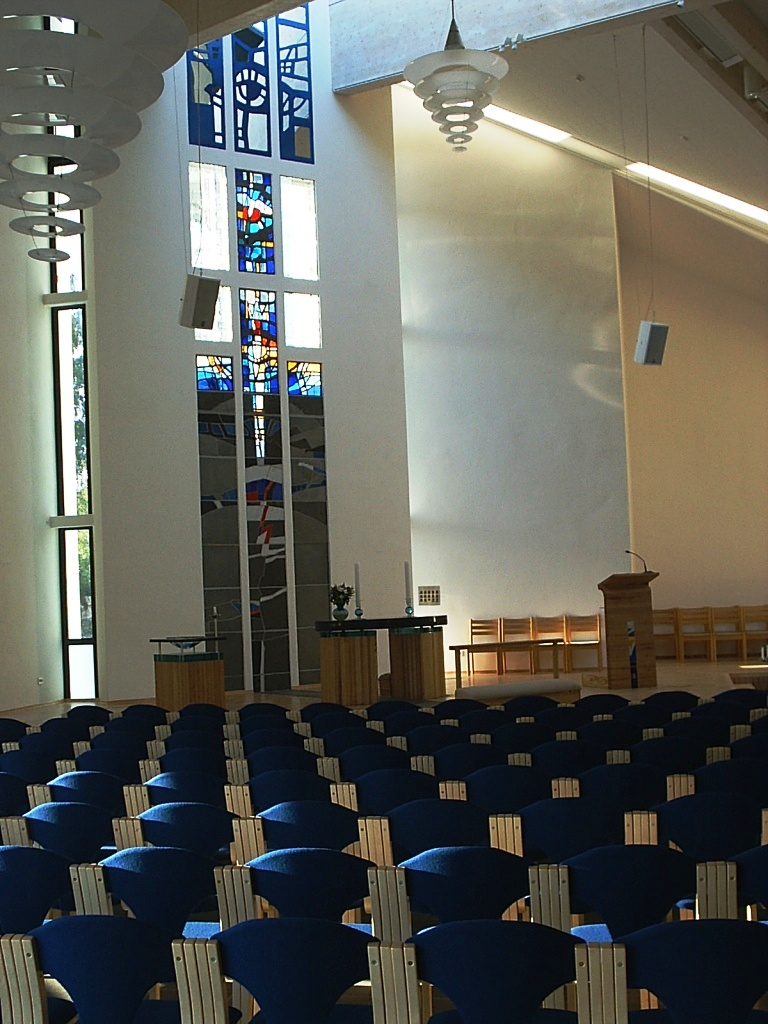

== See also ==
- List of churches in Bjørgvin
