= Nordhaug =

Nordhaug is a surname. Notable people with the surname include:

- Halvor Nordhaug (born 1953), Norwegian Lutheran bishop, son of Ole
- Lars Petter Nordhaug (born 1984), Norwegian road bicycle racer
- Ole Nordhaug (1925-2021), Norwegian Lutheran bishop
