= Atle Sommerfeldt =

Norwegian prelate (born 1951)

The Right Reverend Atle Sommerfeldt
- Bishop of Borg
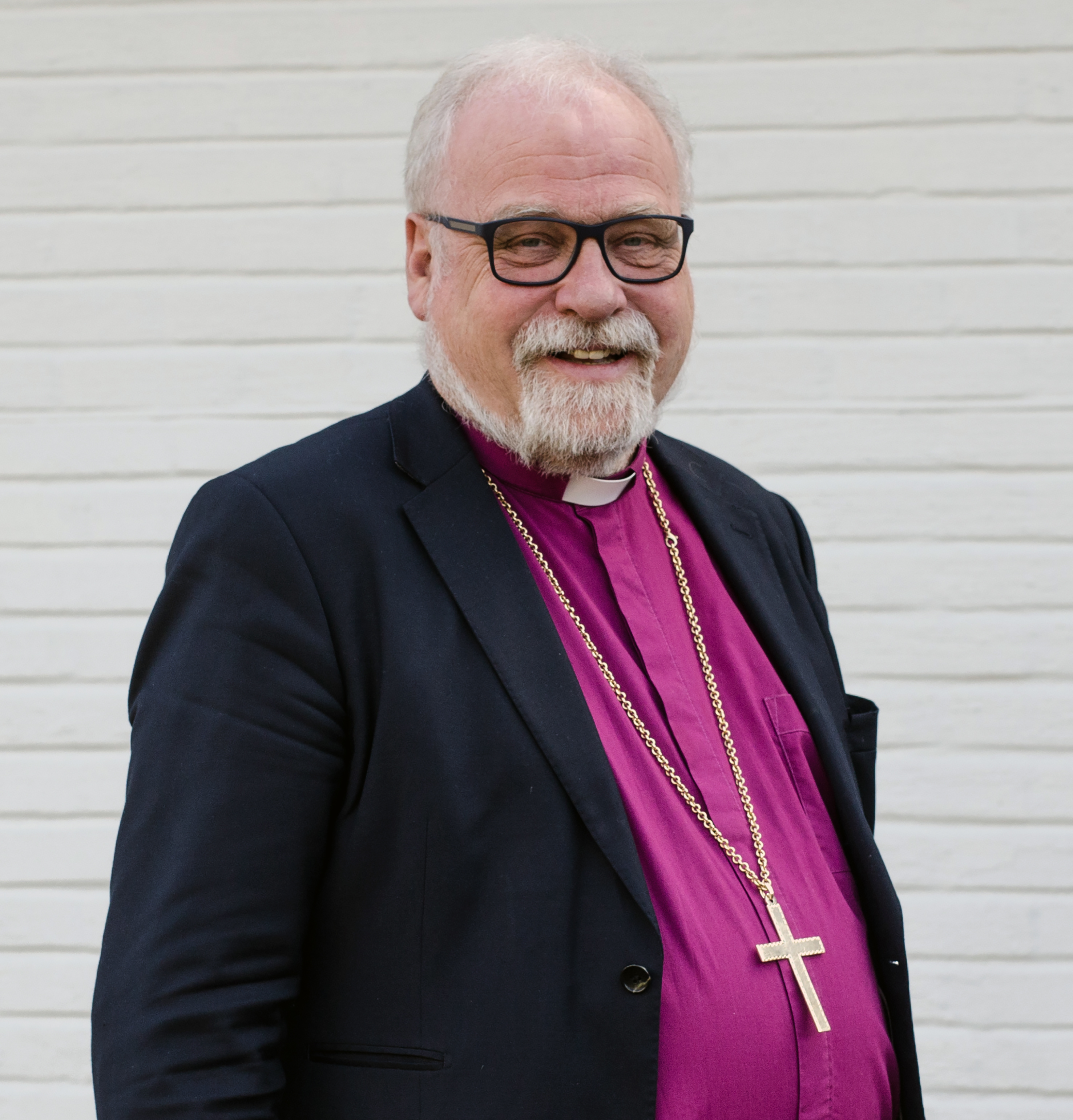
- Church: Church of Norway
- Diocese: Borg
- Elected: 28 October 2011
- In office: 2012
- Predecessor: Helga Haugland Byfuglien
- Successor: Kari Mangrud Alvsvåg

Orders
- Ordination: June 1982 by Andreas Aarflot
- Consecration: 29 January 2012 by Helga Haugland Byfuglien

Personal details
- Born: 22 November 1951 (age 75)
- Denomination: Lutheran
- Spouse: Marianne Uri - Øverland

Ordination history of Atle Sommerfeldt
History
Priestly ordination
- Ordained by: Andreas Aarflot
Episcopal consecration
- Principal consecrator: Helga Haugland Byfuglien
- Co-consecrators: Solveig Fiske; Eva Brunne; Munib Younan

Atle Sommerfeldt (born 22 November 1951) is a Norwegian prelate, who resigned from being the Bishop of Borg late in 2021. Prior to becoming a bishop, he was Secretary General of the Norwegian Church Aid from 1994 to 2012.

== Biography ==
Sommerfeldt was appointed Bishop of Borg on 28 October 2011 and was consecrated bishop on 29 January 2012 in Fredrikstad Cathedral. Sommerfeldt holds a degree in theology gained in 1980. He has previously been a priest in the Diocese of Oslo (1982-1984), general secretary of the Botswana Christian Council (1989-1993) and general secretary of the Council on Ecumenical and International Relations of the Church of Norway (1993–94).
