= Sør-Vågsøy Church =

Church in Vestland, Norway

- Sør-Vågsøy kyrkje
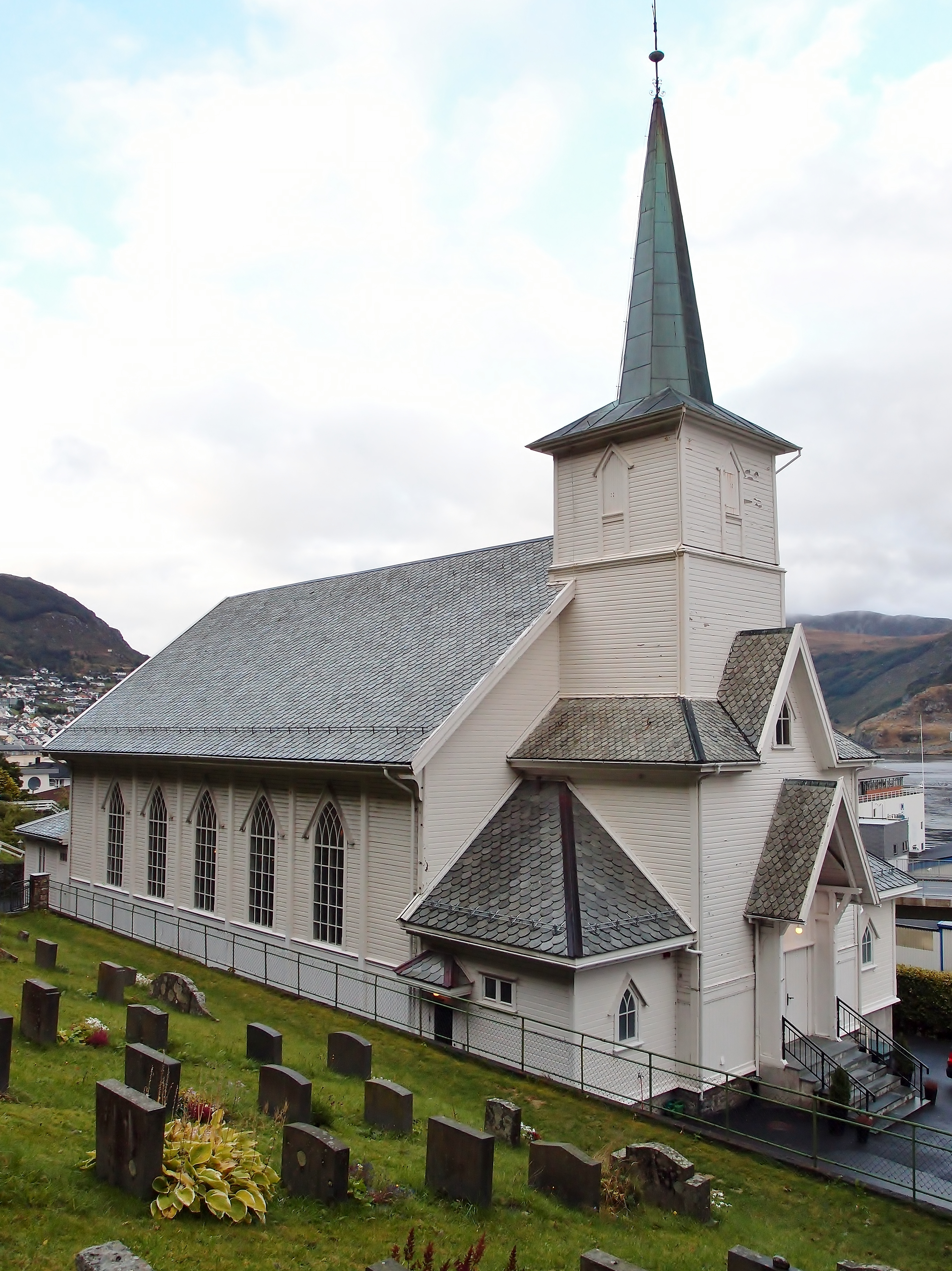
- View of the church
- Sør-Vågsøy Church
- 61°55′49″N 5°06′39″E
- Location: Kinn Municipality, Vestland
- Country: Norway
- Denomination: Church of Norway
- Churchmanship: Evangelical Lutheran

History
- Status: Parish church
- Founded: 1907
- Consecrated: 1907

Architecture
- Functional status: Active
- Architect: Lars Sølvberg
- Architectural type: Long church
- Style: Neo-Gothic
- Completed: 1907 (119 years ago)

Specifications
- Capacity: 600
- Materials: Wood

Administration
- Diocese: Bjørgvin bispedømme
- Deanery: Nordfjord prosti
- Parish: Sør-Vågsøy
- Norwegian Cultural Heritage Site
- Type: Church
- Status: Not protected
- ID: 85065

Sør-Vågsøy Church (Norwegian: Sør-Vågsøy kyrkje) is a parish church of the Church of Norway in Kinn Municipality in Vestland county, Norway. It is located in the town of Måløy on the southeastern coast of the island of Vågsøy. It is the church for the Sør-Vågsøy parish which is part of the Nordfjord prosti (deanery) in the Diocese of Bjørgvin. The white, wooden church was built in a long church style in 1907 by the architect Lars Sølvberg. The church seats about 600 people.

== History ==
Historically, the island of Vågsøy was part of the Selje Church parish. In 1900, the Vågsøy area was made into a separate parish with Vågsøy Church serving the whole parish. Soon after, there were demands for a new church to be built in Måløy that would serve the southern part of the island. In 1905, the fairly new parish of Vågsøy was divided into two parishes. Vågsøy Church would be renamed Nord-Vågsøy Church and it would serve the northern part of the island and a new Sør-Vågsøy Church would be built for the southern part of the island. The new church was designed by Lars Sølvberg from Utvik. Construction on the new church began in 1906. On 5 September 1907, Sør-Vågsøy Church was consecrated by Bishop Johan Willoch Erichsen. The church is a neo-Gothic, wooden long church with a choir on the north end of the nave with a sacristy on each side of the choir. The church porch is on the south end of the nave and it has a tower above it. The altarpiece was painted in 1907 by artist Sveinung Aanondsen (1854-1919). The church was extensively renovated in 1951–1952. At this time, new stained glass windows were added in the eight large windows in the nave's long walls, electrical heating was added, and a bathroom was built. In 2006, the church porch was enlarged to all a meeting room, cloak room, and bathrooms. On 1 January 2020, the island of Vågsøy became a part of the newly created Kinn Municipality (before that, it was part of Vågsøy Municipality).

== Media gallery ==
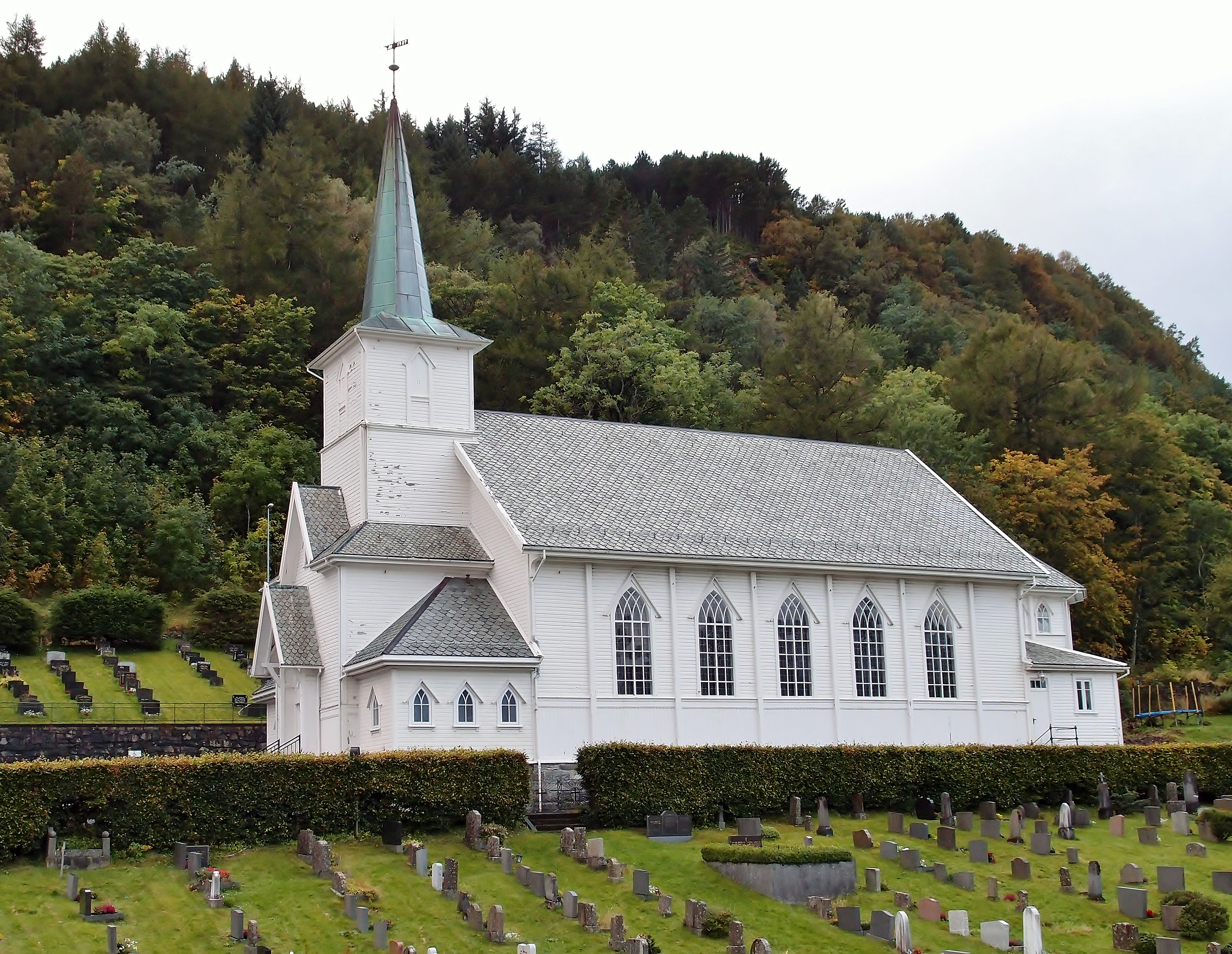
View of the present church

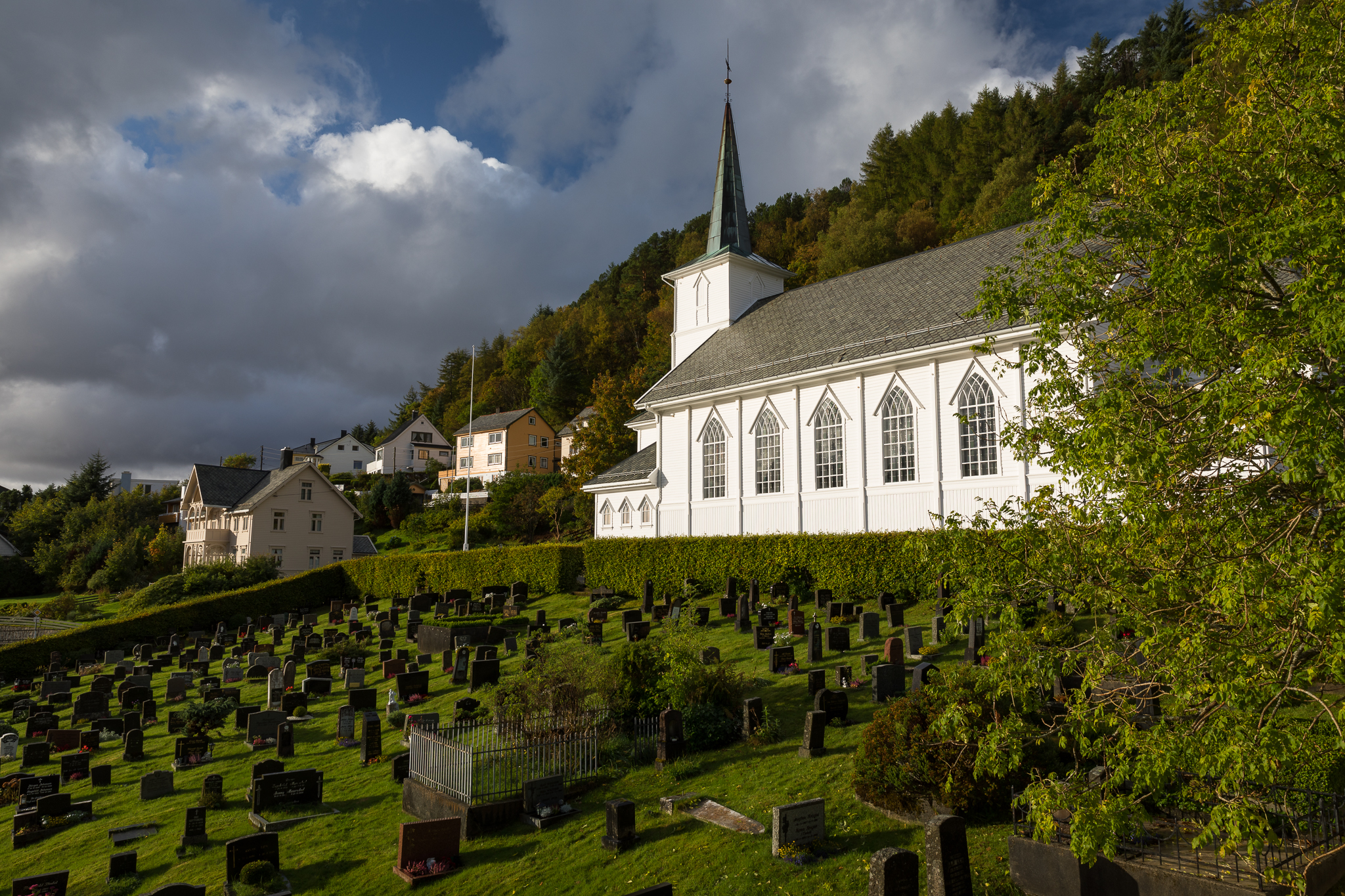
View of the present church

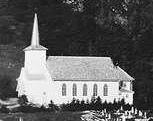
View of the church in 1930

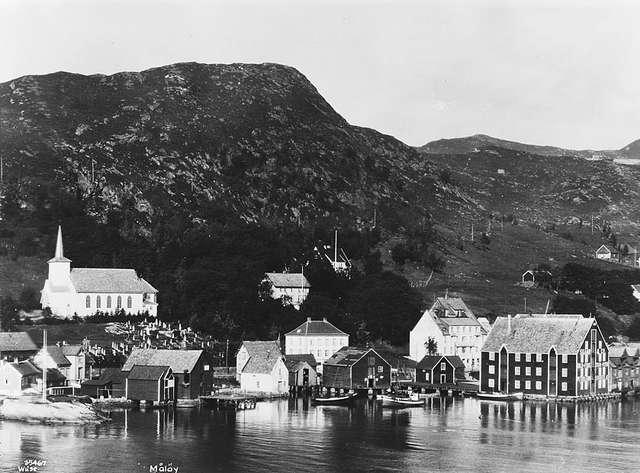
View of the church in 1930

== See also ==
- List of churches in Bjørgvin
