= Diocese of Borg =

Diocese in the Church of Norway

Diocese of Borg Borg bispedømme
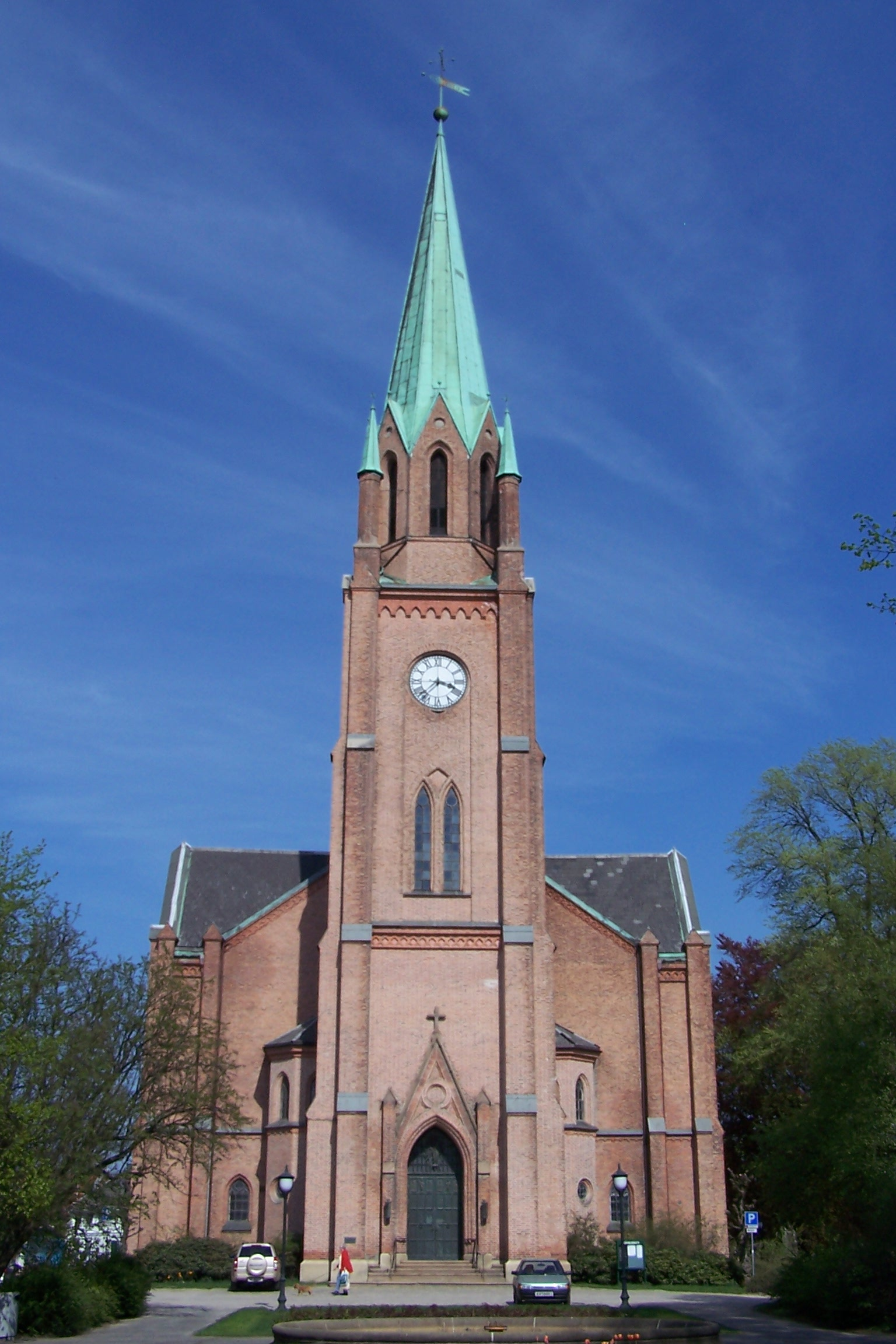
- Fredrikstad Cathedral

Location
- Country: Norway
- Territory: Østfold and parts of Akershus
- Deaneries: 9

Statistics
- Parishes: 116
- Members: 494,008

Information
- Denomination: Church of Norway
- Established: 1969
- Cathedral: Fredrikstad Cathedral

Current leadership
- Bishop: Kari Mangrud Alvsvåg

Map

Borg is a diocese in the Church of Norway. The diocese includes parishes in the counties of Østfold and Akershus, excluding Asker and Bærum. It was created in 1969 by separation from the Diocese of Oslo. The Cathedral City is Fredrikstad.

== Fredrikstad Cathedral ==
Fredrikstad Cathedral was designed by architect Waldemar F. Luhr and built in 1880. The cathedral as built of red brick and has a capacity of 1,100 seats. It was originally named Vestre Fredrikstad Church. When Borg diocese was created in 1968, the cathedral changed its name. The cathedral is in the Gothic Revival style.

The stained-glass windows by Emanuel Vigeland date from 1917. Wilhelm Peters, working twenty years prior, decorated the cathedral's pulpit and created a colourful altarpiece done in wood and representing Jesus curing a blinded man.

The cathedral was restored and enlarged by architect Arnstein Arneberg in 1954. The interior was designed by Norwegian painter Axel Revold.

== Structure ==
The Diocese of Borg is divided into eight deaneries (Norwegian: Prosti) spread out over Viken county. Each deanery corresponds a geographical area, usually one or more municipalities in the diocese. Each municipality is further divided into one or more parishes which each contain one or more congregations.

Deanery (Prosti)	Municipalities
Fredrikstad domprosti	Fredrikstad, Hvaler
Søndre Borgesyssel prosti	Halden, Sarpsborg
Østre Borgesyssel prosti	Aremark, Aurskog-Høland, Indre Østfold, Marker, Rakkestad, Skiptvet
Vestre Borgesyssel prosti	Moss, Råde, Våler
Nordre Follo prosti	Enebakk, Nordre Follo
Søndre Follo prosti	Frogn, Nesodden, Vestby, Ås
Nedre Romerike prosti	Lillestrøm, Lørenskog, Nittedal, Rælingen
Øvre Romerike prosti	Eidsvoll, Gjerdrum, Hurdal, Nannestad, Ullensaker

== List of bishops ==
- 1969−1976 : Per Lønning
- 1976−1977 : Andreas Aarflot
- 1977−1990 : Gunnar Lislerud
- 1990−1998 : Even Fougner
- 1998−2005 : Ole Christian Kvarme
- 2005–2012 : Helga Haugland Byfuglien
- 2012–2021 : Atle Sommerfeldt
- 2022-present : Kari Mangrud Alvsvåg
