= Halvor Nordhaug =

Norwegian bishop

The Right Reverend Halvor Nordhaug
- Bishop of Bjørgvin
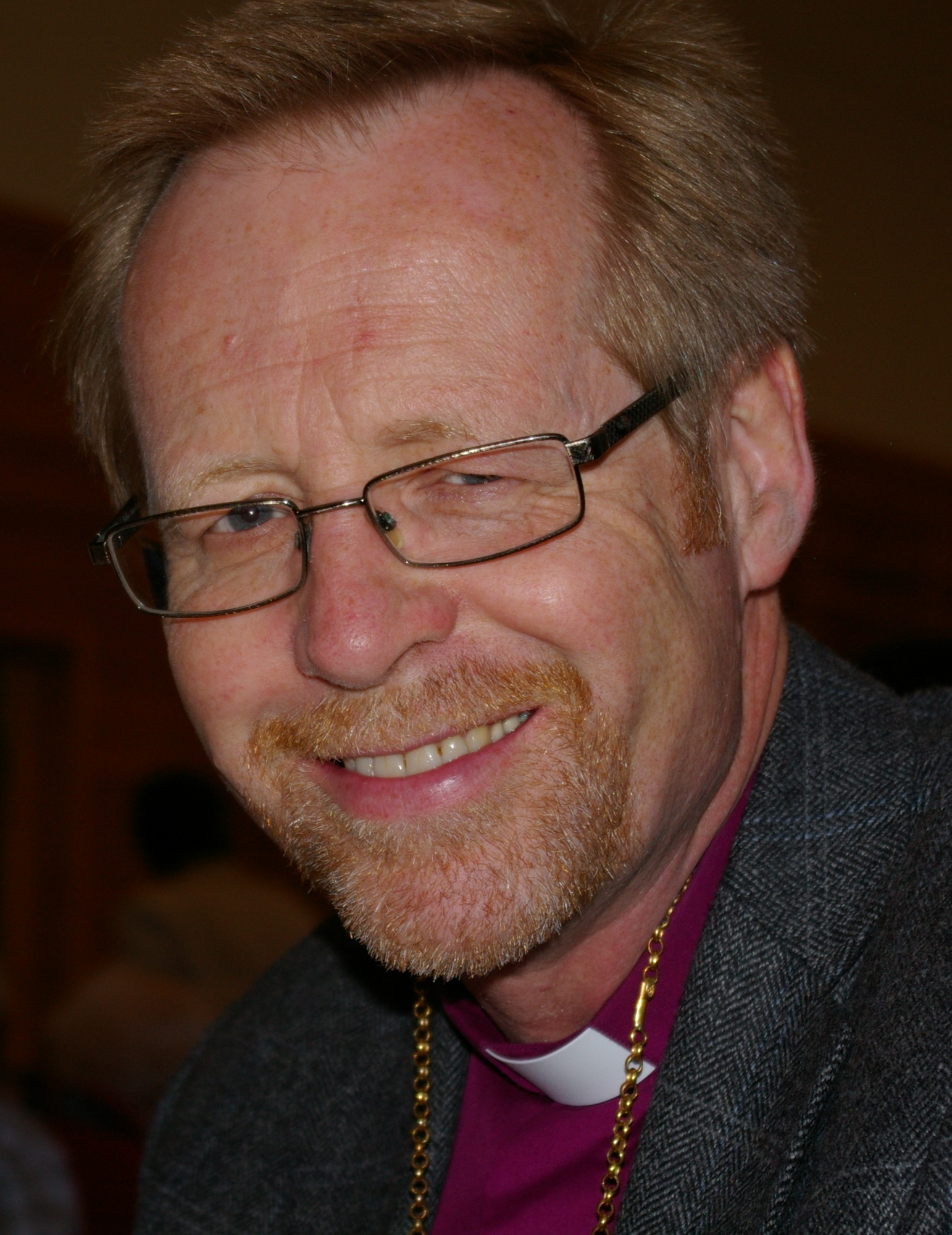
- Church: Church of Norway
- Diocese: Diocese of Bjørgvin
- Appointed: 2008
- Predecessor: Ole Hagesæther
- Successor: Ragnhild Jepsen

Personal details
- Born: 26 February 1953 (age 73) Norway
- Denomination: Lutheran
- Parents: Ole Nordhaug; Liv Eldbjørg Nordhaug
- Children: 3
- Occupation: Priest
- Education: Cand.theol. (1978)
- Alma mater: MF Norwegian School of Theology

Halvor Nordhaug (born 26 February 1953) is a Norwegian former Bishop in the Lutheran Church of Norway. He was appointed bishop of the Diocese of Bjørgvin in 2008 and served in that capacity until 2023. Nordhaug is the son of bishop Ole Nordhaug and psalmist Liv Nordhaug. Halvor Nordhaug is married and has three children.

Nordhaug received his Cand.theol. degree in 1978 from the MF Norwegian School of Theology. He was ordained in 1979 at the Fredrikstad Cathedral. Since that time he has served as a pastor at Heistadmoen in 1980. From 1981 until 1986, he was pastor for Norwegian students abroad, employed by the Norwegian Seamen's Church. He was a consultant for the Ecumenical Council of the Church from 1986–1991. Then from 1991 to 1995, he was a pastor in the parish of Ås. From 1995 until 2008, he was the Rector of Practical theology at the MF Norwegian School of Theology.

Church of Norway titles
Preceded by Ole Hagesæther	Bishop of Bjørgvin; Since 2008	Succeeded by Ragnhild Jepsen
