= Ole Hagesæther =

The Right Reverend Ole Danbolt Hagesæther
- Bishop Emeritus of Bjørgvin
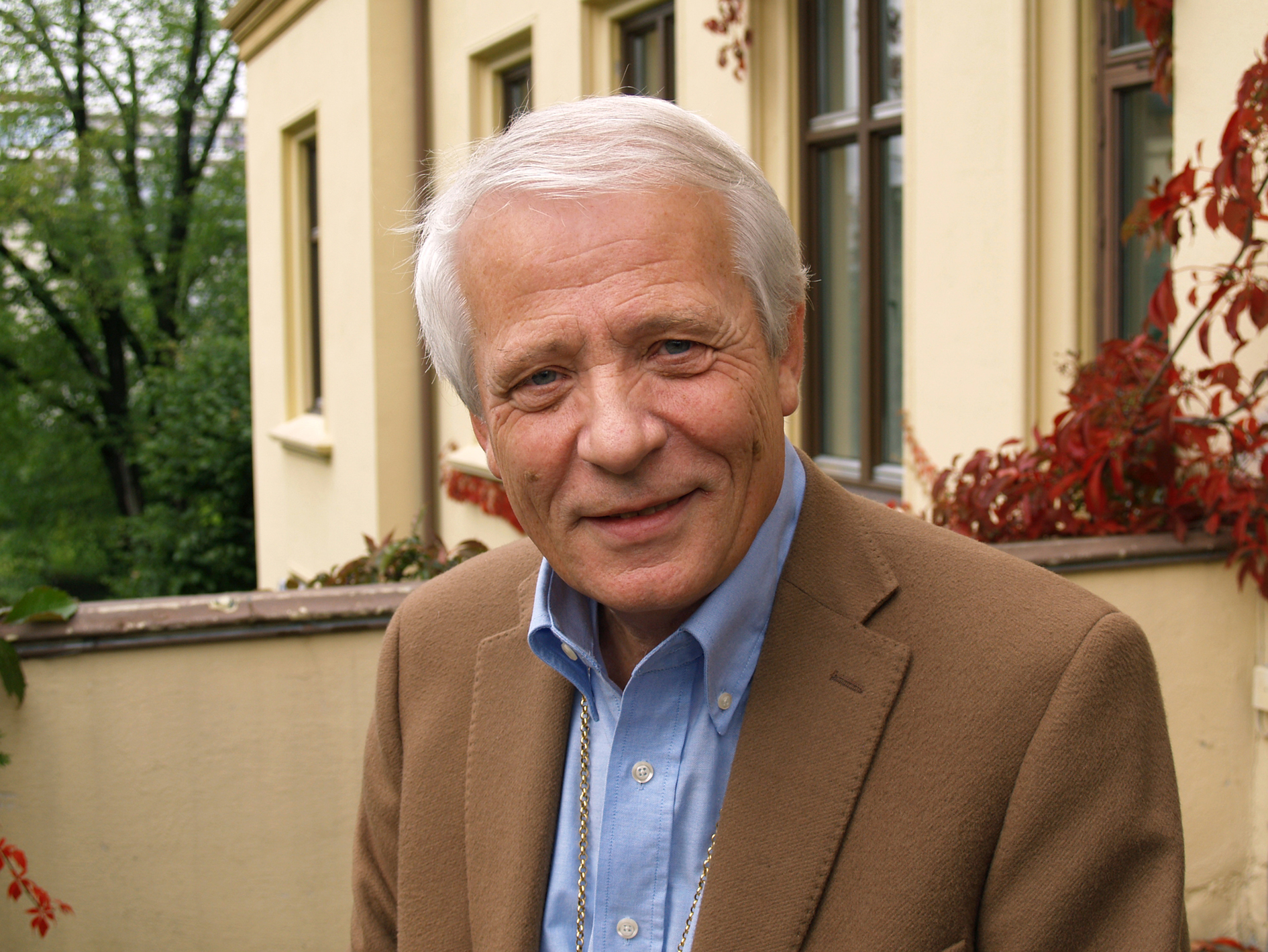
- Church: Church of Norway
- Diocese: Bjørgvin
- In office: 1994–2008
- Predecessor: Per Lønning
- Successor: Halvor Nordhaug

Personal details
- Born: 3 October 1941 (age 85) Bergen, Norway
- Denomination: Christian
- Parents: Olav Hagesæther
- Occupation: Priest
- Education: MF Norwegian School of Theology, Cand.theol. (1965)

Ole Danbolt Hagesæther is a Norwegian theologian with the Church of Norway. He was born on 3 October 1941 in Bergen, Norway, and he served as the Bishop of the Diocese of Bjørgvin from 1994 until his retirement in 2008. Hagesæther is the son of theologian Olav Hagesæther.

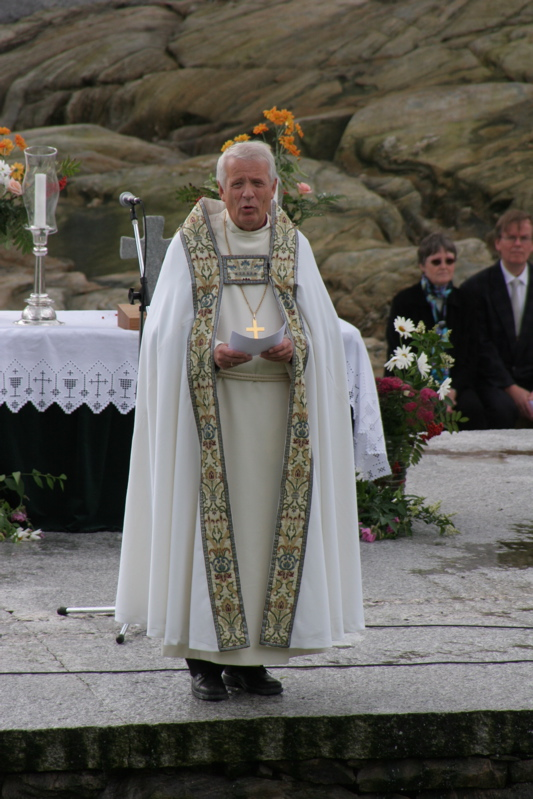
View of Hagesæther in 2005 in Gulen Municipality

Hagesæther received his theological education from the MF Norwegian School of Theology in Oslo, and he graduated with his Cand.theol. degree in 1965. He served as a priest for a total of 41 years; with the last 13 years as Bishop. His farewell church service as a bishop was held in the Bergen Cathedral on 30 November 2008.

He began his career as a substitute priest for the Diocese of Bjørgvin, filling in wherever needed from 1967–1968. Then from 1969 until 1971 he was a chaplain in the parish of Sunndal Municipality. From 1972–1974, he worked as a hospital chaplain at a hospital. From 1974-1979 he was a lecturer on the faculty of the MF Norwegian School of Theology in Oslo. From 1980 to 1989, he served as the vicar in Holmen Church outside of Oslo. From 1989 to 1994, he served as the vicar of Nordstrand Church and also as the Dean of the Søndre Aker prosti (deanery). He served as the Bishop of the Diocese of Bjørgvin from 1994 until 2008 when he retired.

Church of Norway titles
Preceded by Per Lønning	Bishop of Bjørgvin; 1994–2008	Succeeded by Halvor Nordhaug
