= Ragnhild Jepsen =

Norwegian Lutheran bishop

- Born: 4 November 1969 (age 56)
- Occupations: Priest, bishop

Ragnhild Jepsen (born 4 November 1969) is a Norwegian priest. A provost in the Nidaros Cathedral, she was appointed bishop of the Diocese of Bjørgvin in February 2023, succeeding Halvor Nordhaug.

Jepsen was born on 4 November 1969, and grew up in Ål. Her bishop ordination was set to be on 16 April 2023.

Church of Norway titles
Preceded by Halvor Nordhaug	Bishop of Bjørgvin; Since 2023	Incumbent
