= Per Lønning =

Norwegian politician

The Right Reverend Per Lønning
- Bishop
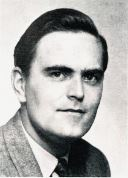
- Church: Church of Norway
- Diocese: Borg and Bjørgvin
- In office: 1969–1978, 1987–1994

Personal details
- Born: 24 February 1928 Norway
- Died: 21 August 2016 (aged 88) Norway
- Denomination: Christian
- Occupation: Priest
- Education: Doctor of Theology
- Alma mater: University of Oslo

Per Lønning (24 February 1928 – 21 August 2016) was a Norwegian Lutheran bishop and politician. Lønning received a Doctor of Theology degree from the University of Oslo in 1955 and a Doctor of Philosophy degree in 1958.

Lønning began his career as a priest in Oslo in 1951. He also taught in a school in Oslo in 1954. From 1958 to 1965 he was elected as a member of the Norwegian Parliament for the Conservative Party of Norway. In 1964, Lønning was named the priest for the parish of Bergen. In 1969, he was named the bishop of the Diocese of Borg, a diocese that had just been created by splitting off from the large Diocese of Oslo. He was the first Bishop to lead this diocese and he served for nine years until he resigned in 1978 in protest against the passing of a law that allowed abortion on demand in Norway. After resigning, he taught at the University of Oslo for four years and then from 1981 to 1987 he was professor at the University of Strasbourg. In 1987 he was named bishop of the Diocese of Bjørgvin in Bergen. He held this post until 1994, when he retired.

Per Lønning was the brother of the late theologian, professor, university rector, and politician Inge Lønning.

He was a member of the Norwegian Academy of Science and Letters.

Church of Norway titles
New diocese Split off from Diocese of Oslo	Bishop of Borg; 1969–1978	Succeeded by Andreas Aarflot
Preceded by Tor With	Bishop of Bjørgvin; 1987–1994	Succeeded by Ole Hagesæther
