= Ole Nordhaug =

Norwegian Lutheran bishop (1925–2021)

The Right Reverend Ole Nordhaug
- Bishop Emeritus of Møre
- Church: Church of Norway
- Diocese: Diocese of Møre
- In office: 1983—1991

Personal details
- Born: 3 February 1925 Bolsøy Municipality, Norway
- Died: 19 September 2021 (aged 96) Oslo, Norway
- Denomination: Christian
- Spouse: Liv Nordhaug
- Children: Halvor Nordhaug
- Occupation: Priest
- Education: Cand.theol. (1951)
- Alma mater: MF Norwegian School of Theology

Ole Nordhaug (3 February 1925 – 19 September 2021) was a Norwegian Lutheran bishop. He was the first Bishop of the Diocese of Møre from its creation in 1983 until his retirement in 1991.

== Career ==
Nordhaug graduated in 1951 with his Cand.theol. degree from the MF Norwegian School of Theology. Then he worked for the Church of Norway as secretary of the Priest's Association and the Oslo Diocesan Council from 1965 to 1969. He then served as a pastor in Onsøy from 1969 to 1977. He became the Dean of the Fredrikstad Cathedral from 1977 until 1983. On 18 September 1983, Nordhaug was consecrated as the first Bishop of the newly created Diocese of Møre. He was seated at Molde Cathedral from then until his retirement on 17 November 1991.

== Personal life ==
Nordhaug was born on 3 February 1925 in Bolsøy Municipality, Norway. He was married to psalmist Liv Nordhaug and he is the father of Bishop Halvor Nordhaug. He died on 19 September 2021 at the age of 96.

Religious titles
New diocese	Bishop of Møre; 1983–1991	Succeeded by Odd Bondevik
