= Per Juvkam =

The Right Reverend Per Juvkam

Personal details
- Born: 21 March 1907 Sør-Aurdal, Norway
- Died: 22 February 2003 (aged 95) Oslo, Norway
- Denomination: Church of Norway
- Occupation: Priest
- Education: MF Norwegian School of Theology (Cand.theol.)
- Years active: 1938–1977

Per Juvkam (1907–2003) was a Norwegian Lutheran Bishop. He was born in 1907 in Sør-Aurdal Municipality in Oppland county, Norway. He served as Bishop of the Diocese of Bjørgvin from 1961 to 1977.

== Life and career ==
Juvkam graduated as cand.theol. from the MF Norwegian School of Theology, Religion and Society in 1936, and was ordained as priest in 1937. He was assistant priest in Sør-Aurdal parish in 1937 and in Vestre Toten parish from 1938. From 1945 he worked for the diocese of Hamar.

He served there until 1950 when he took a new job as the head parish priest for the parish of Vestre Slidre Municipality. In 1957, he took a new job as a priest in the Sinsen parish in Oslo. After 3 years on that job, in 1961 he was named the Bishop of the Diocese of Bjørgvin, based in the city of Bergen, appointed by minister of church affairs Helge Sivertsen, and succeeding Ragnvald Indrebø. He was succeeded by Thor With in 1977.

Juvkam did some writing in the 1970s and 1980s during his retirement. Among his publications are a collection of sermons called Høgtidsdagar i Bjørgvin from 1977 and a book about the church in Norway Folkekirken – visjon og virkelighet from 1980. He also worked on the translation of the Bible into Nynorsk.

He was portrayed by the painter Bjørn Tvedt in 1977.

Juvkam died in Oslo on 22 February 2003 at the age of 95.

Church of Norway titles
Preceded by Ragnvald Indrebø	Bishop of Bjørgvin; 1961–1977	Succeeded by Thor With
