= Thor With =

Norwegian bishop and theologian

Thor Scherffenberg With
- Diocese of Bjørgvin
- In office: 1977–1987
- Predecessor: Per Juvkam
- Successor: Per Lønning

Orders
- Ordination: 1946

Personal details
- Born: 14 January 1918 Honningsvåg, Norway
- Died: 5 June 1997 (aged 79) Norway
- Denomination: Church of Norway
- Occupation: Priest
- Education: Cand.theol.
- Years active: 1946–1987

Thor Scherffenberg With was a Norwegian bishop and theologian in the Church of Norway. He was bishop of the Diocese of Bjørgvin from 1977 until 1987.

Thor With was born on 14 January 1918 in the village of Honningsvåg in Nordkapp Municipality in far northern Norway. He received his cand.theol. degree in 1943 and was ordained as a priest in 1946. He completed further studies of the Northern Sami language in 1950 from the University of Oslo.

With served as the acting parish priest in Narvik from 1947 until 1949. He then was an assistant priest at Tromsø Cathedral from 1949–1950. In 1950 he became the rector of the Sami folk high school in Karasjok Municipality, a position he held until 1957. He next was the parish priest in Tana Municipality from 1957 until 1961. In 1961 he became the secretary general of the Norwegian Sami Mission (Norwegian: Norges Samemisjon). In 1968 he left Northern Norway and became the head chaplain at the Deaconess Hospital in Oslo, where he stayed until 1975. In 1975, he became the Dean of Nidaros Cathedral in Trondheim. Then in 1977, he succeeded Per Juvkam as the new bishop of the Diocese of Bjørgvin, based in the city of Bergen. He retired in 1987.

With died on 5 June 1997 at the age of 79.

Church of Norway titles
Preceded by Per Juvkam	Bishop of Bjørgvin; 1977–1987	Succeeded by Per Lønning
