= Waldemar Sefsland Dahl =

Norwegian painter and sculptor

Waldemar Sefland Dahl (6 April 1900 – 20 June 1984) was a Norwegian painter and sculptor.

He was born in Fredrikstad to parents Mons Carolus Dahl and Julie Frasiska Holm. He took his education at the Norwegian National Academy of Fine Arts from 1920 to 1922 and at the Norwegian National Academy of Craft and Art Industry from 1922 to 1923. He participated in the Oslo National Academy of the Arts from 1921. He exhibited at Blomqvists Kunsthandel in Oslo in 1925, Kunstnerforbundet in Oslo in 1929 and Dunkejongaarden in Fredrikstad in 1961.

He is principally featured in Fredrikstad, with decorations at the City Hall and Fredrikstad Cathedral as well as twelve busts spread across the city. He is represented at the National Gallery of Norway in Oslo, Nordenfjeldske Kunstindustrimuseum in Trondheim and Skagens Museum in Denmark. His portrait of Jakob Sande is owned by the National Gallery of Norway.
