= Kari Mangrud Alvsvåg =

Norwegian Lutheran bishop (born 1970)

- Bishop of Borg
- Church: Church of Norway
- Diocese: Borg
- Elected: 10 February 2022
- Predecessor: Atle Sommerfeldt

Orders
- Ordination: 1999
- Consecration: 24 April 2022

Personal details
- Born: 31 July 1970 (age 56) Lørenskog
- Denomination: Lutheran
- Education: MF Norwegian School of Theology, Religion and Society

Kari Mangrud Alvsvåg (born 31 July 1970) is a Norwegian Lutheran bishop. She has been the Bishop of Borg in the Church of Norway since 2022.

== Life and career ==
Born in Lørenskog on 31 July 1970, Alvsvåg grew up in Råde. She graduated from the MF Norwegian School of Theology, Religion and Society in 1998, and was ordained as priest in 1999, as seamen's priest in Dubai, where she served from 1999 to 2002. Then followed a period as lecturer and councellor in Østfold, as provost in Sarpsborg (Søndre Borgesyssel) from 2012, and in Fredrikstad from 2020.

Alvsvåg was elected as bishop of the Diocese of Borg on 10 February 2022. succeeding Atle Sommerfeldt. She was consecrated as bishop on 24 April 2022.

Religious titles
Preceded by Atle Sommerfeldt	Bishop of Borg; 2022–present	Incumbent
