= Ragnvald Indrebø =

20th-century Norwegian Lutheran bishop

The Right Reverend Ragnvald Andreas Indrebø
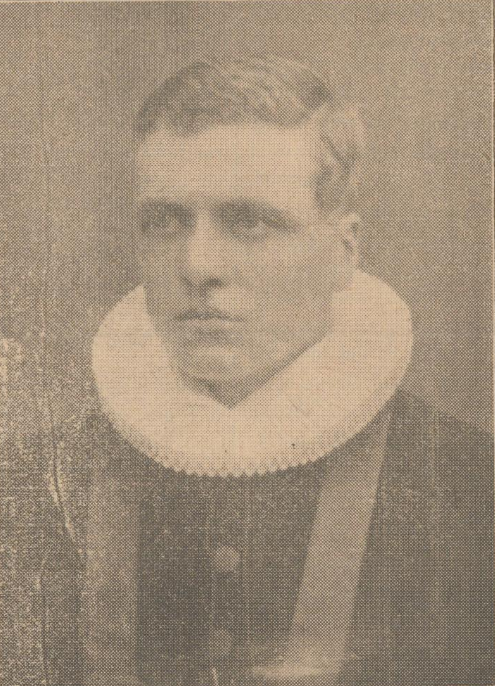
- Church: Church of Norway

Personal details
- Born: 22 November 1891 Os, Norway
- Died: 26 June 1984 (aged 92) Bergen, Norway
- Denomination: Christian
- Occupation: Priest

Ragnvald Andreas Indrebø (22 November 1891–26 June 1984) was a Norwegian Lutheran Bishop. He was born in Os Municipality. He was part of the movement to translate the Norwegian Bible into the Nynorsk written language during the 1930s. He edited the periodical Luthersk Kirketidende from 1938 to 1948. He served as Bishop of the Diocese of Bjørgvin from 1948 to 1961.

== Early life ==
Ragnvald Indrebø was born on 22 November 1891 in Os Municipality, a small municipality located just south of the city of Bergen in Søndre Bergenhus county, Norway. His parents were Ludvig Johannes Indrebø and Severine Malene Frøysland. His brother was Gustav Indrebø, who went on to be a famous linguist in Norway. The family moved around when he was young, living in Jølster Municipality, Gaular Municipality, and finally Vestre Aker. In 1911, he began to study theology at the MF Norwegian School of Theology in Oslo. He received his Cand.theol. degree in 1918.

== Career ==
Indrebø first took a job as a teacher from 1919–1922. In 1922, he was hired as the priest of the parish of Jølster Municipality (where he lived as a child). He kept that job until 1927 when he took a new job as the leader of the Sunnfjord School. In 1929–1930, he was the general secretary of the Norwegian Christian Youth Organization (affiliated with the worldwide YMCA organization), but illness forced him to quit after 1 year's service. From 1930 until 1948, he was a priest working in Oslo. From 1930-1934 he was based at the Matteus parish, then from 1934-1946 he was based at the St. Jakob parish, and then from 1946-1948 he was based at the parish of Vestre Aker. In 1948, he was named the Bishop of the Diocese of Bjørgvin, based in Bergen. He held this post until his retirement in 1961. Indrebø died on 26 June 1984 in Bergen, Norway.

== Beliefs ==
Indrebø was a conservative and traditionalist priest. During the debates on hell and female priests of the 1950s, Indrebø sided with other priests such as Ole Hallesby and opposing fellow bishops such as Kristian Schjelderup. Indrebø believed in a literal hell, as well as opposing the ordination of female priests because he believed the Bible did not support that position.

Church of Norway titles
Preceded by Andreas Fleischer	Bishop of Bjørgvin; 1948–1961	Succeeded by Per Juvkam
