= Bergen Cathedral =

Cathedral in Vestland, Norway

- Bergen domkirke
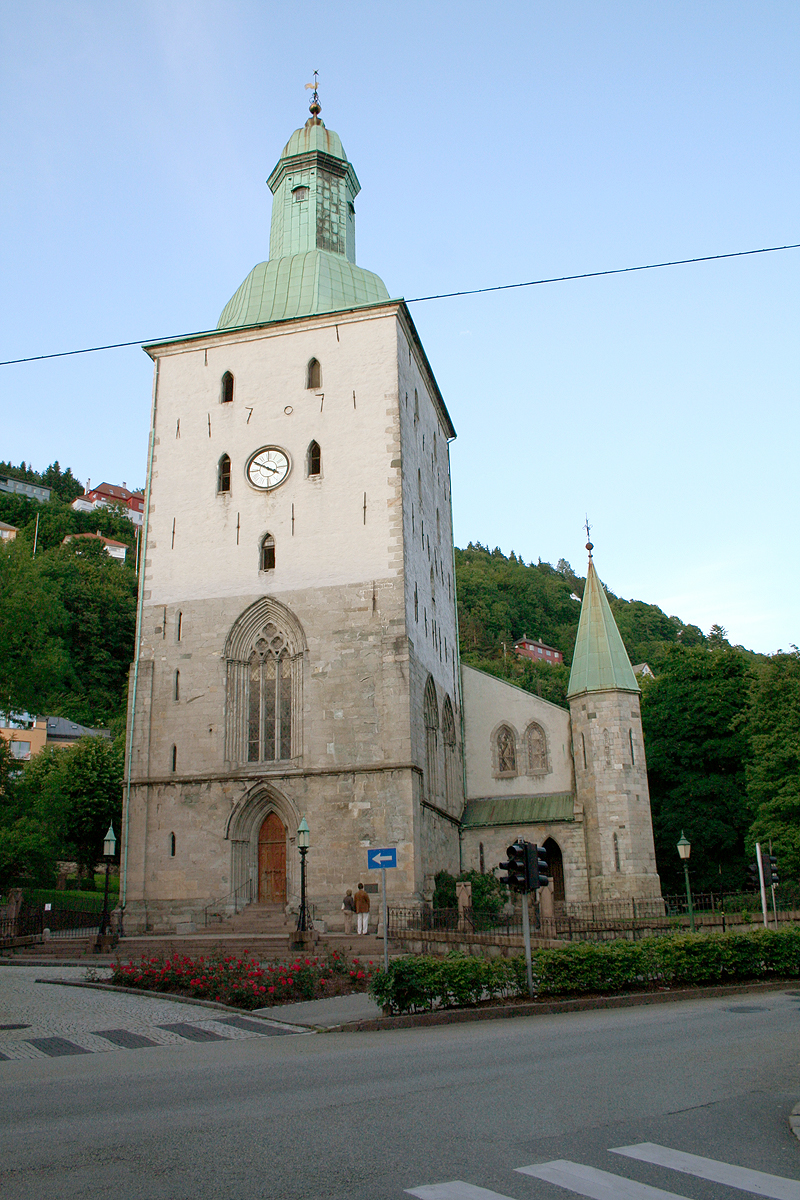
- View of the cathedral
- Bergen Cathedral
- 60°23′38″N 5°19′51″E
- Location: Bergen, Vestland
- Country: Norway
- Denomination: Church of Norway
- Previous denomination: Catholic Church
- Churchmanship: Evangelical Lutheran

History
- Status: Parish church
- Founded: 12th century
- Consecrated: c. 1250
- Events: Renovated several times, most recently in the 1880s

Architecture
- Functional status: Active
- Architect(s): Christian Christie (1880s renovation)
- Architectural type: Long church
- Completed: c. 1250 (776 years ago)

Specifications
- Capacity: 615
- Materials: Stone

Administration
- Diocese: Bjørgvin bispedømme
- Deanery: Bergen domprosti
- Parish: Bergen domkirke
- Norwegian Cultural Heritage Site
- Type: Church
- Status: Automatically protected
- ID: 83876

Bergen Cathedral (Norwegian: Bergen domkirke) is a cathedral in the city of Bergen in Vestland county, Norway. It is the episcopal seat of the Church of Norway's Diocese of Bjørgvin as well as the seat of the "Bergen domkirke" parish and the seat of the Bergen domprosti (arch-deanery). It is part of the Church of Norway. The first recorded historical reference to this church is dated 1181. It retains its ancient dedication to Saint Olaf. The cathedral seats about 600 people.

== History ==
The earliest existing historical records of the church date back to the year 1181, when the peasant chief Jon Kutiza attacked King Sverre in Bergen. According to Sverris saga, some of Sverre's men then fled into the church (then known as Olavskirken because it was dedicated to Saint Olaf). At that time, the church was probably a regular parish church, but later, during the reign of King Haakon IV of Norway (1217–63), Franciscan friars must have taken over the church and built a friary by it. The medieval cathedral was instead Christ Church at Bergenhus Fortress, a medieval royal residence in Bergen.

The first church built here had a long church design in the Romanesque style. The nave measured about 20 by 13 metres (66 ft × 43 ft) and the choir was 9 by 18 metres (30 ft × 59 ft) including the apse. Not much else is known about the first stone church on this site.

The old church burned down in 1248 during a large city-wide fire and afterwards, a new stone church was built on the same site. Part of the north wall of the old church was salvaged and incorporated into the new church design. There was another fire in the church in 1270 and Magnus Lagabøte financed the repairs afterwards. In 1463, it burned down again, but it was not fully reconstructed until the 1550s. In 1537, it was decided that the church would be the new cathedral for the diocese to replace the old cathedral at Holmen which was demolished in 1531. Despite being declared the cathedral of the post-Reformation Protestant diocese, the church was not fully rebuilt after the fire in 1463. Bergen's first Protestant bishop, Gjeble Pederssøn, arranged for the completion of the church and it was completed before his death in 1557.

After the fires of 1623 and 1640, Bergen Cathedral received its current general appearance. The steeple on the nave that was built by Bishop Pederssøn, was torn down, and the current tower on the west end was built. As part of the Second Anglo-Dutch War, the 1665 Battle of Vågen took place in the main port area of Bergen. A cannonball from the sea battle between the English and Dutch fleets remains embedded in the cathedral's exterior wall. In 1702, there was an extensive renovation and restoration project that was undertaken after another city-wide fire.

In 1814, this church served as an election church (Norwegian: valgkirke). Together with more than 300 other parish churches across Norway, it was a polling station for elections to the 1814 Norwegian Constituent Assembly which wrote the Constitution of Norway. This was Norway's first national elections. Each church parish was a constituency that elected people called "electors" who later met together in each county to elect the representatives for the assembly that was to meet at Eidsvoll Manor later that year.

During the renovation in the 1880s, under the direction of architects Christian Christie and Peter Andreas Blix, the Rococo interiors were restored to their former medieval appearance.

== Music ==
The present organ at Bergen Cathedral, by Rieger Orgelbau, is from 1997. The organ is the fifth one in the cathedral's history; the first known organ was installed in 1549. The cathedral is used regularly for musical concerts.

== Gallery ==
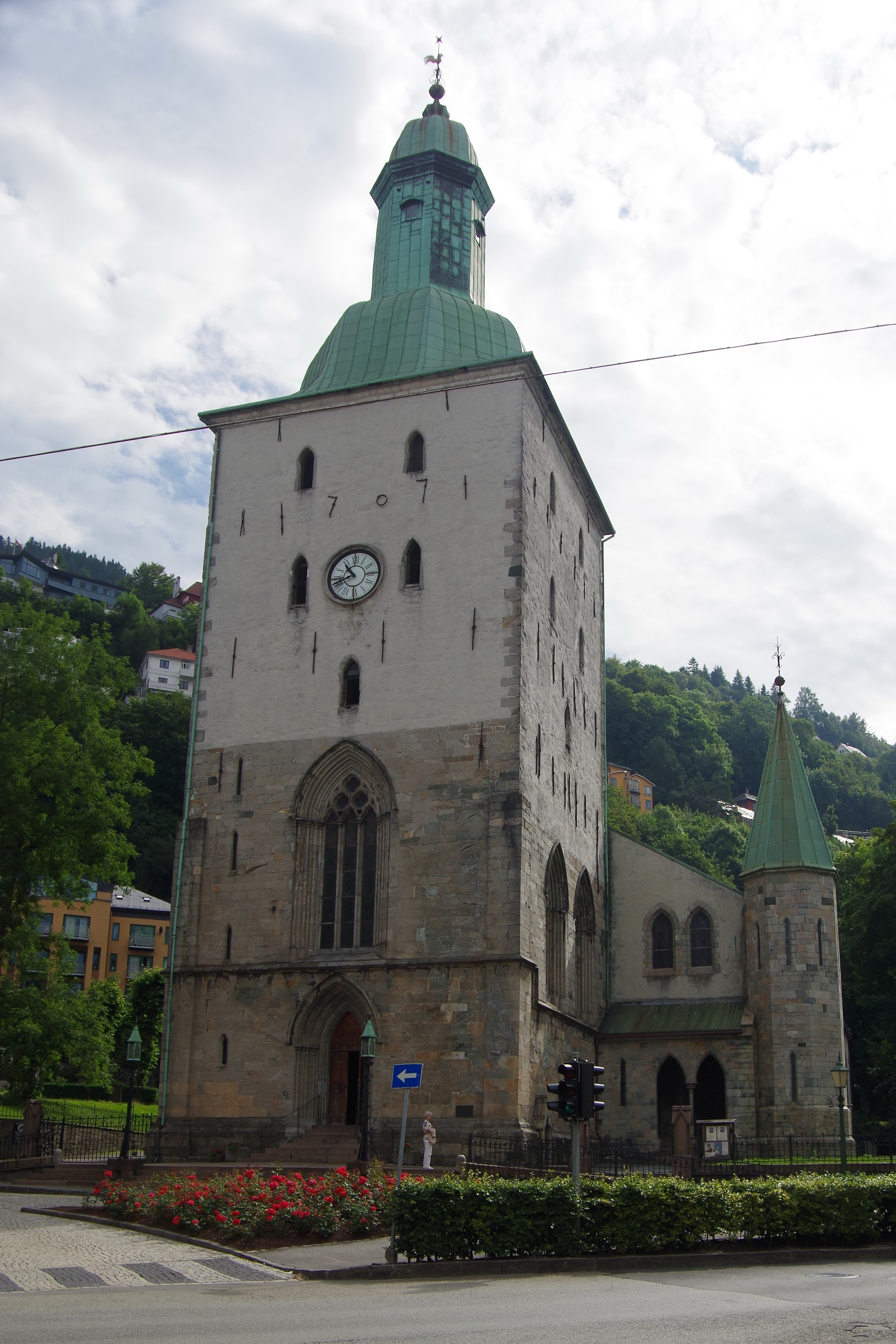
Tower

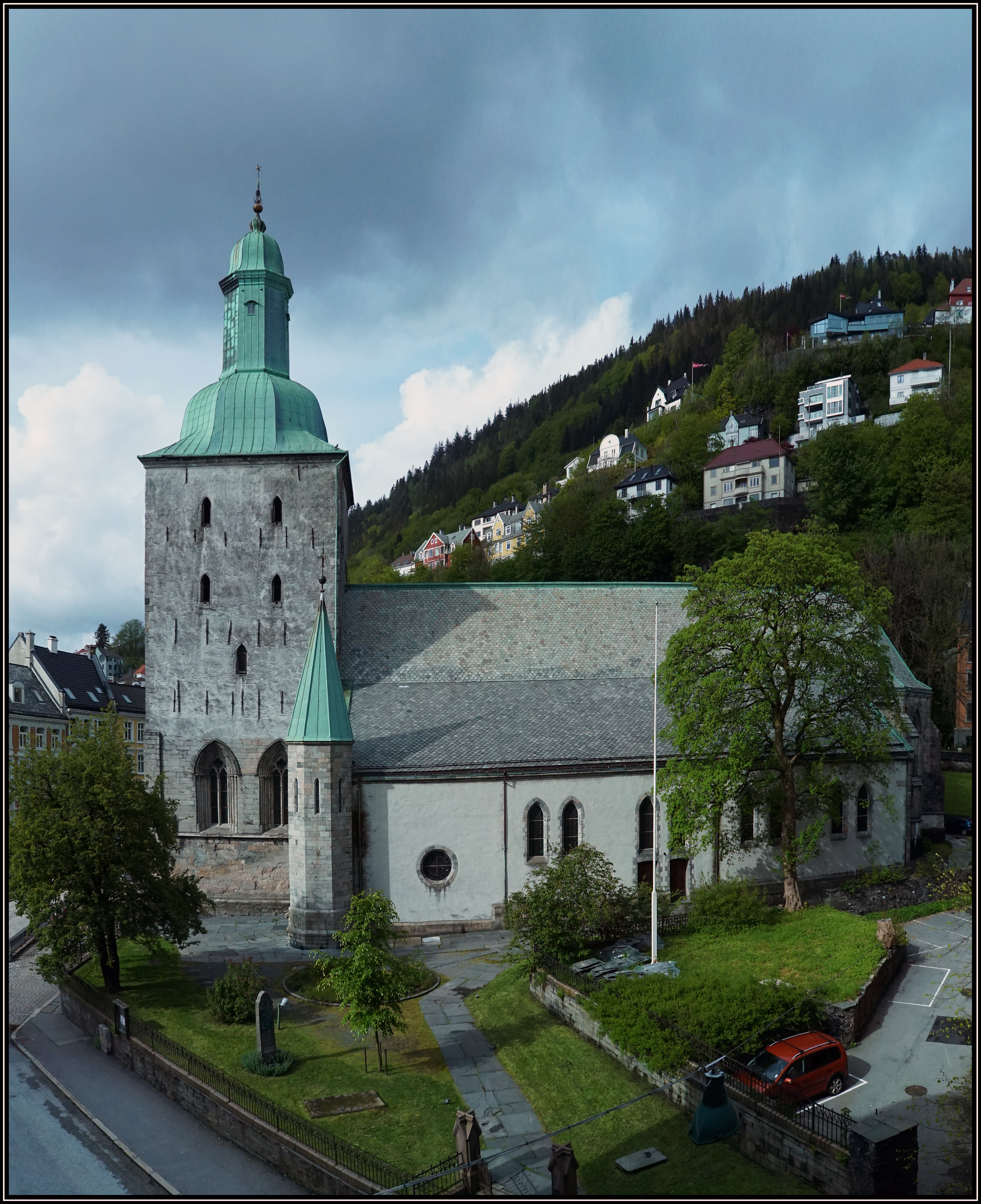
Exterior

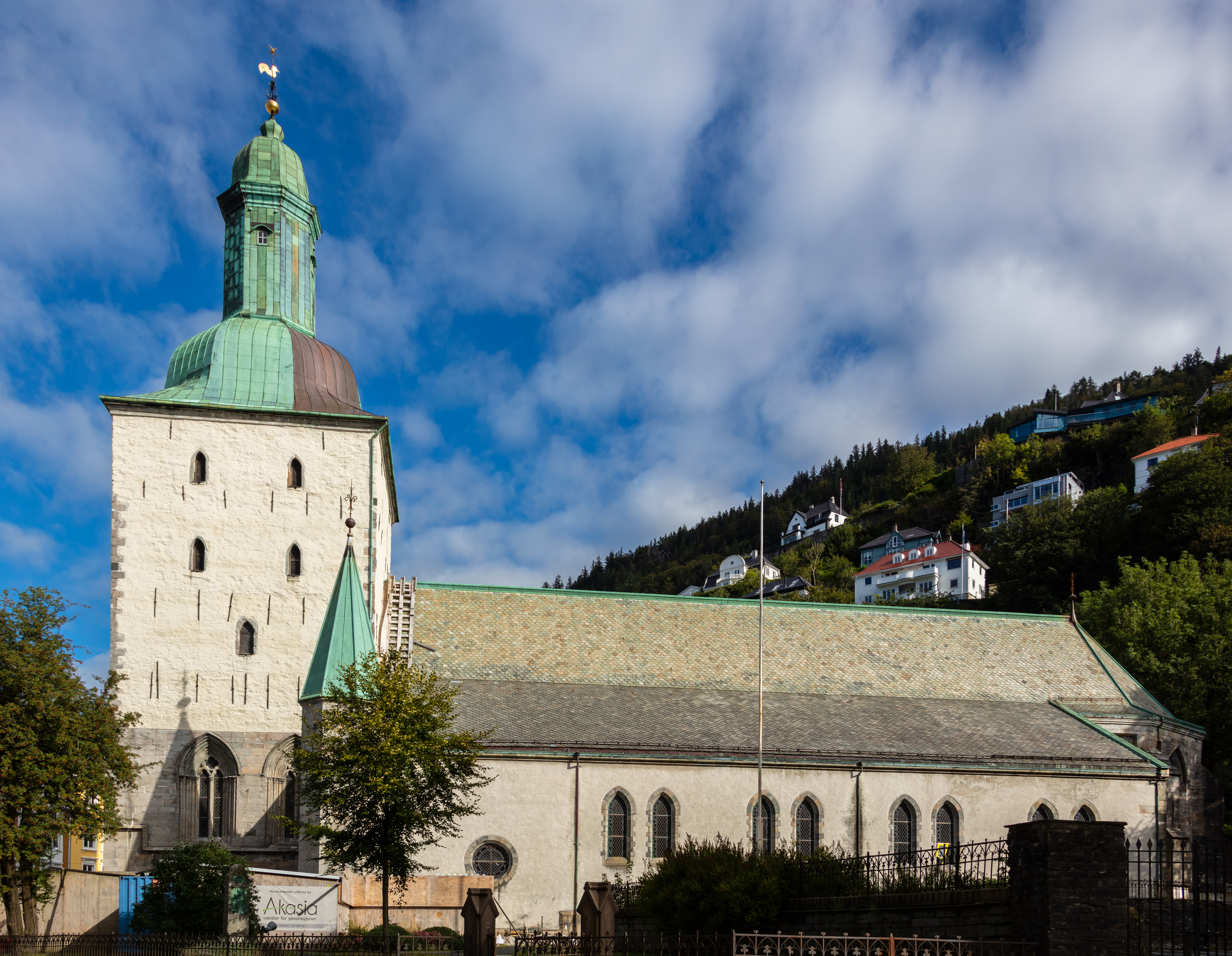

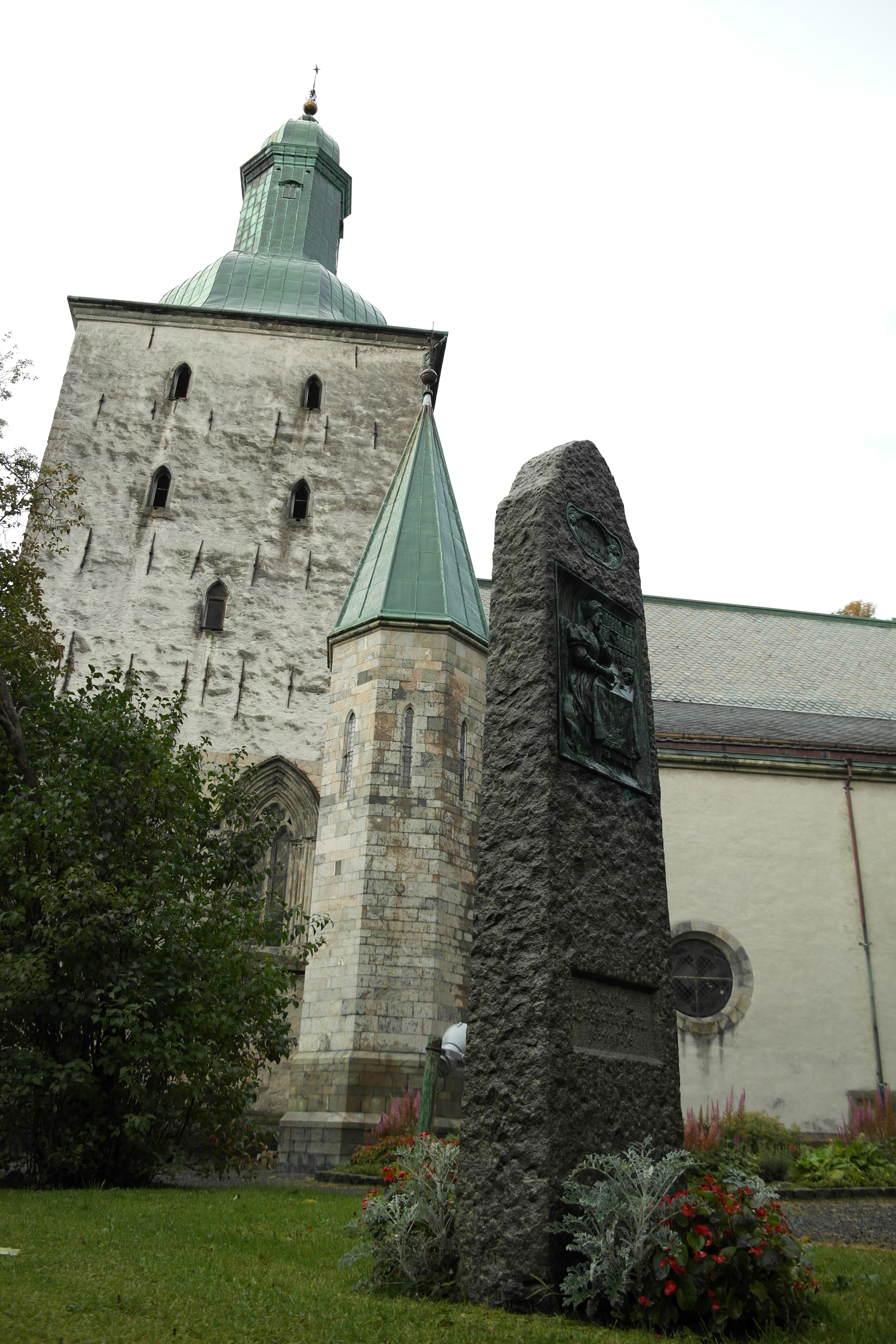

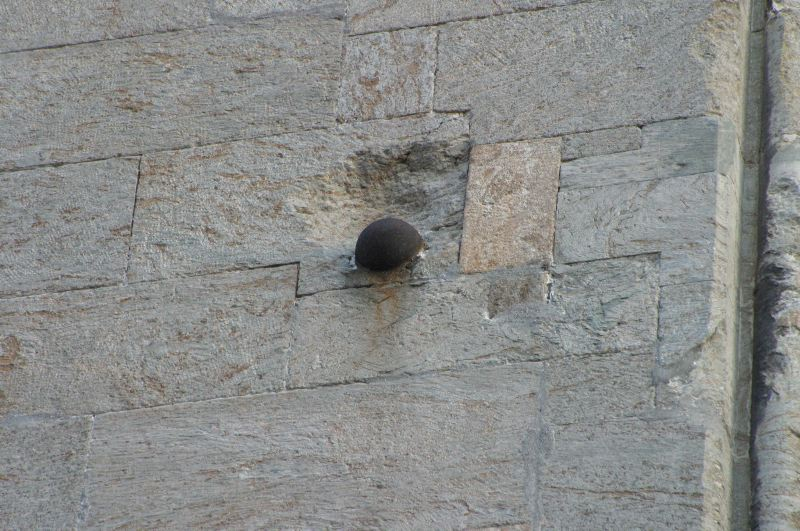
Cannonball in the wall

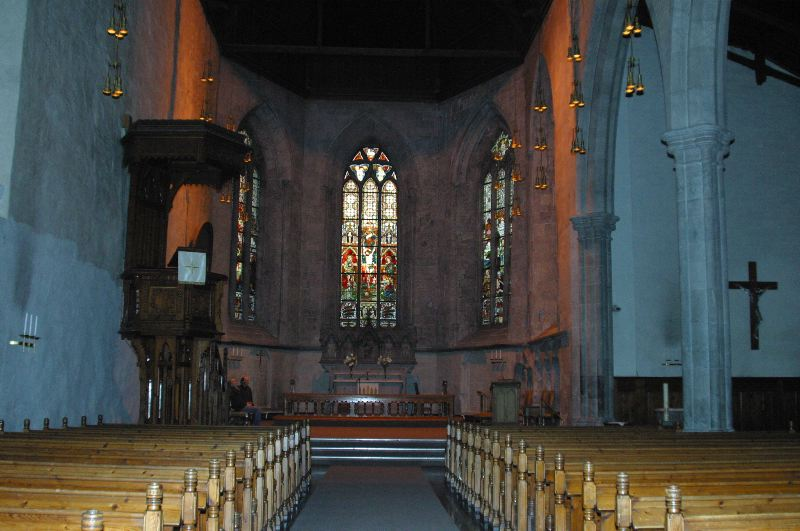
Sanctuary

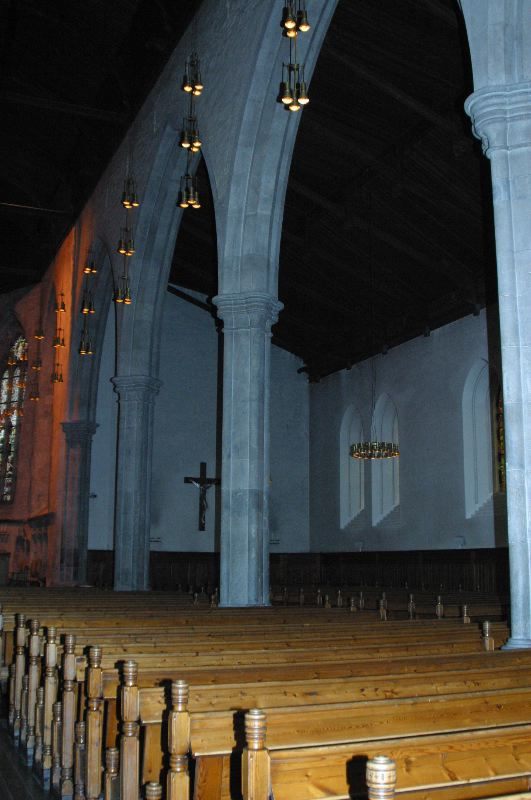
Interior support pillars

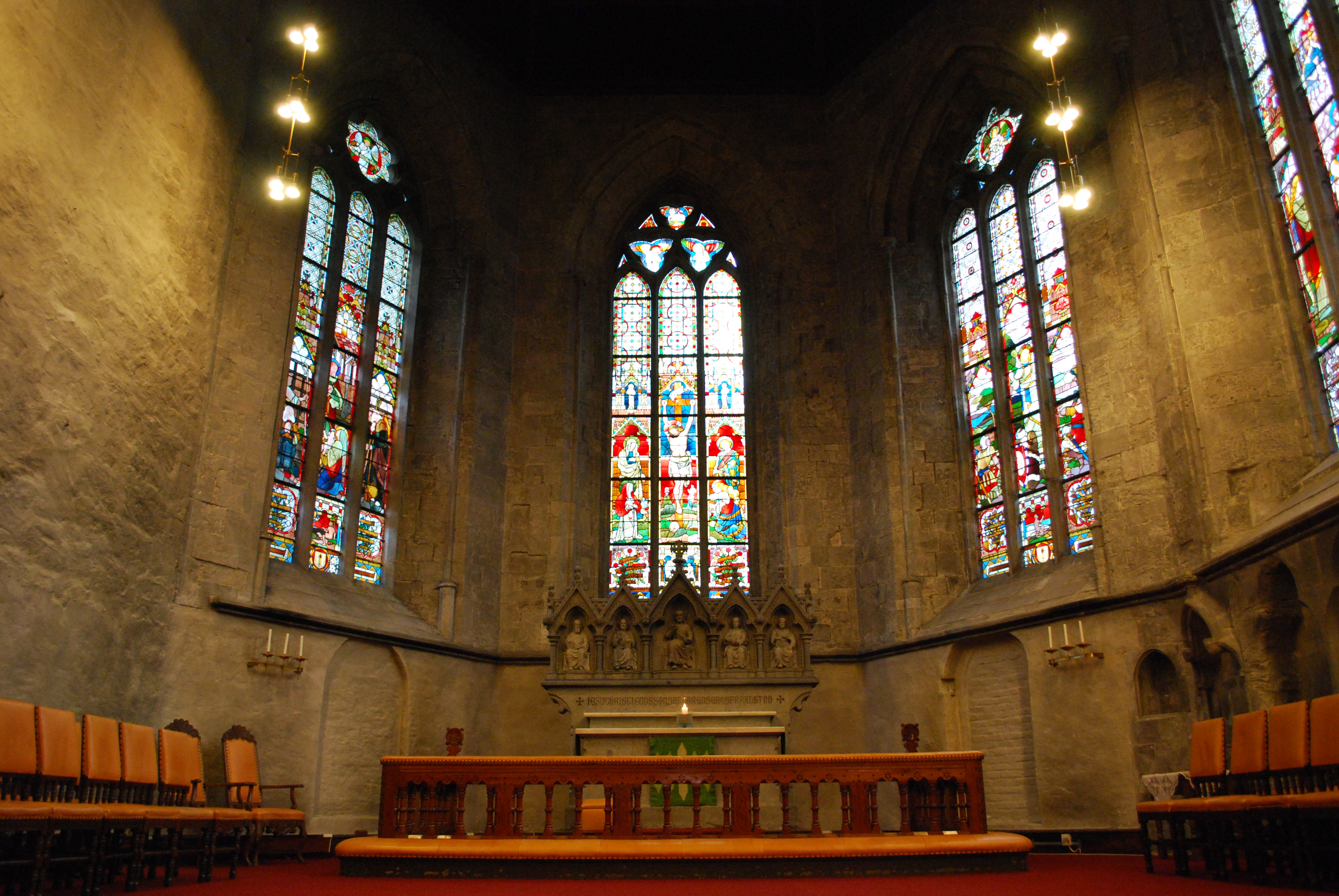
Altar

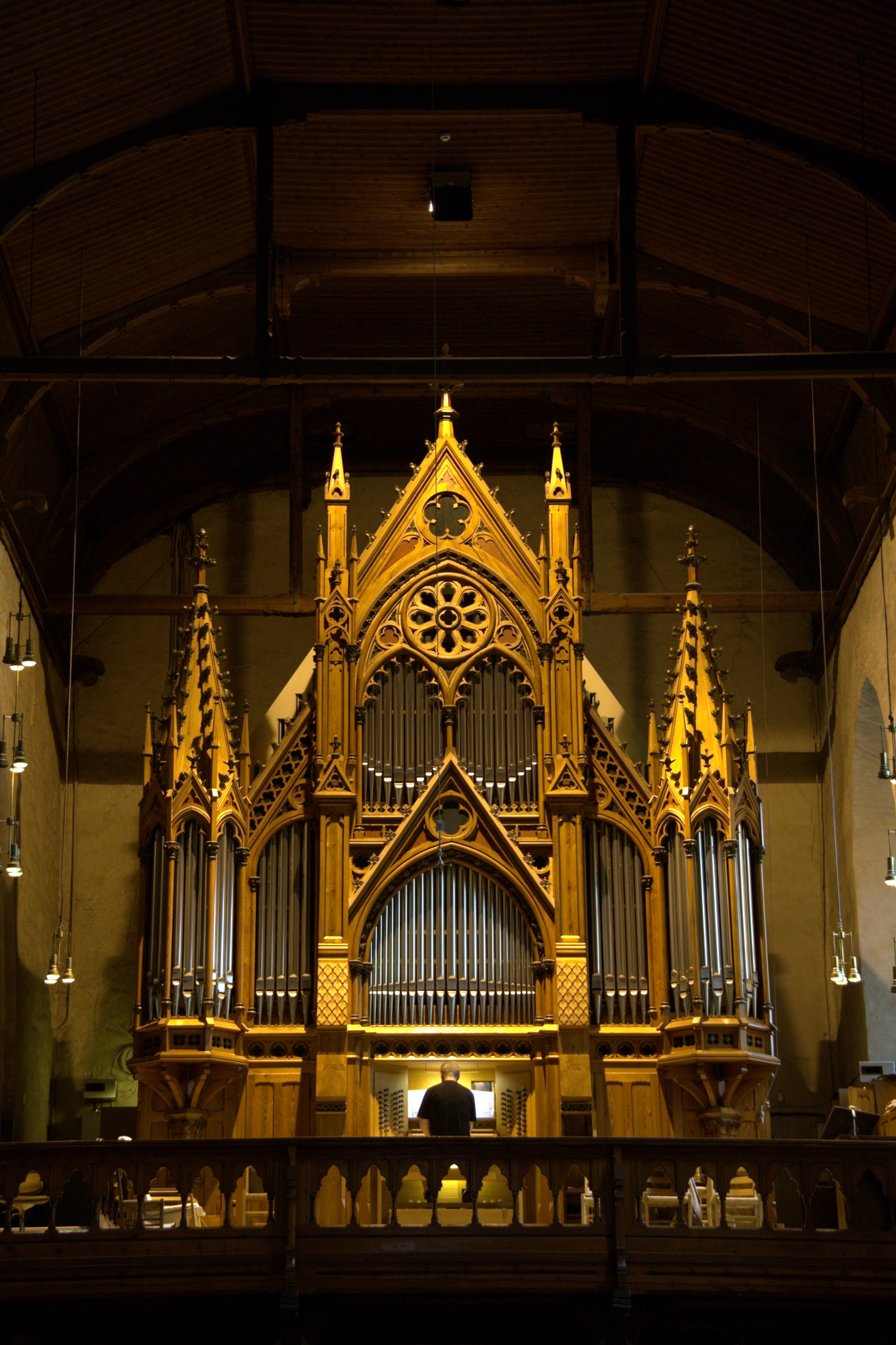
Organ

== See also ==
- List of cathedrals in Norway
- List of churches in Bjørgvin
