= Wilhelm Peters (painter) =

Norwegian painter (1851–1935)

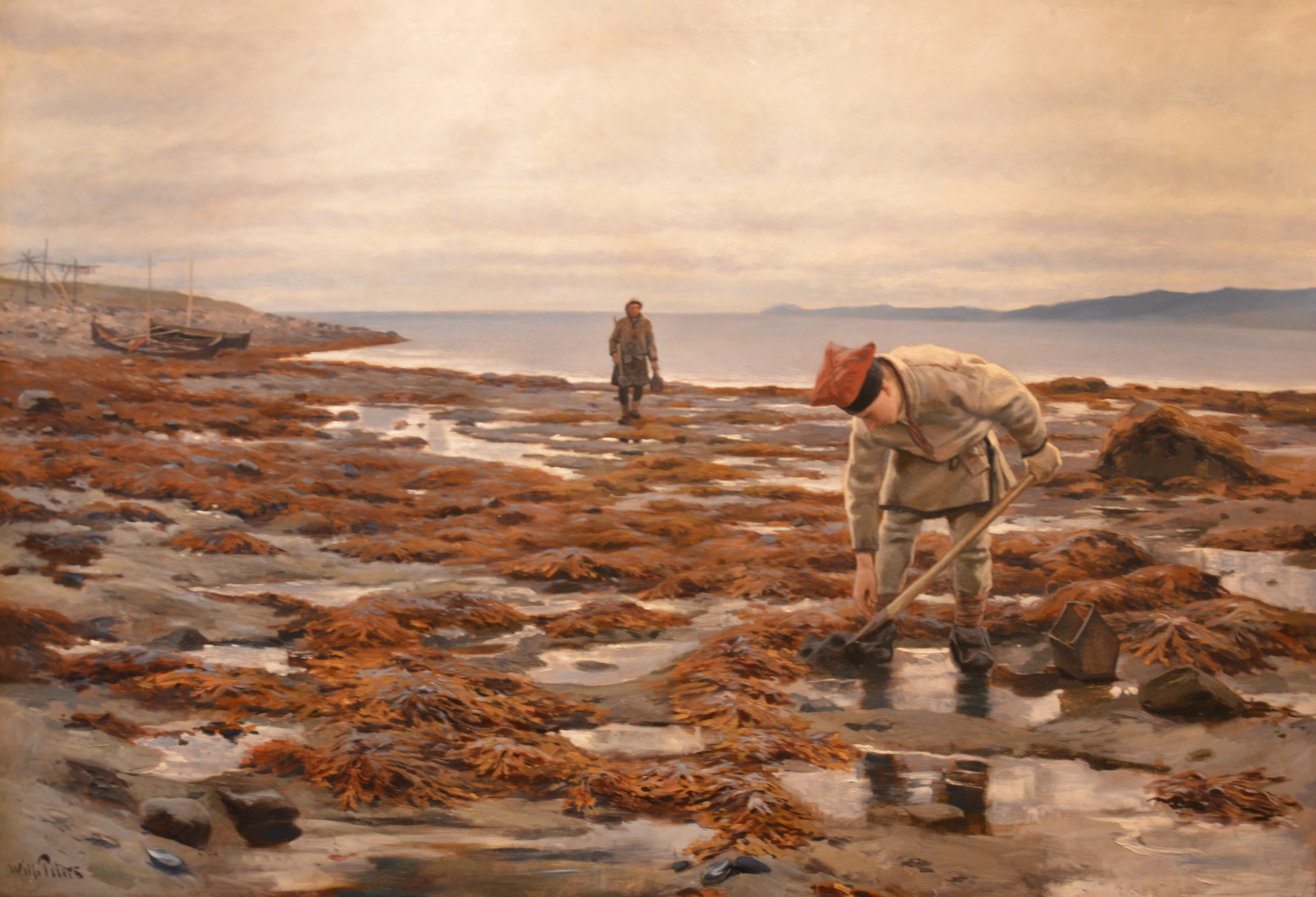
Digging for Worms (1884)

Wilhelm Otto Peters (17 August 1851 – 18 November 1935) was a Norwegian painter who participated in the Modern Breakthrough in Nordic painting. He associated closely with the Skagen Painters in the early 1880s and was one of the first to paint the fishermen in Brøndums store.

== Early life ==
Born in Oslo, Peters studied drawing from 1867 to 1870 under David Arnesen and J.F. Eckersberg. Working as an illustrator, he came to the attention of Karl IV who made arrangements for him to study at the Royal Swedish Academy in Stockholm from 1871 to 1873. He then went to Rome where he studied under Antonio Piccinni from 1873 to 1876, completing his studies in 1880 after periods in Munich and Paris.

== Career ==
Educated as a Historicist painter inspired by Alma Tadema, he turned to folklore, exhibiting in Denmark. While in Paris in the late 1879s, he was attracted by French Naturalism. When he arrived in Skagen in 1881, he had gained international experience from his travels to Germany, Rome and Paris and became a contributor to the Modern Breakthrough in Nordic painting.

After meeting Michael and Anna Ancher during his first visit to Skagen, he returned in 1882 and 1883 when he associated with Christian Krogh, P.S. Krøyer and Eilif Peterssen. He was one of the first of the Skagen Painters to paint the fishermen in the inn, a theme which was later adopted by Michael Ancher and Krøyer.

Peters was successful in having one of his paintings exhibited at Oslo's Høstutstillingen (autumn exhibition) in 1882. In 1885, he became a head teacher at the Norwegian National Academy of Craft and Art Industry, a post he retained until 1923. In addition to his paintings and etchings, he created stained-glass windows including those in St. Olav's Cathedral, Oslo.

== Selected paintings ==
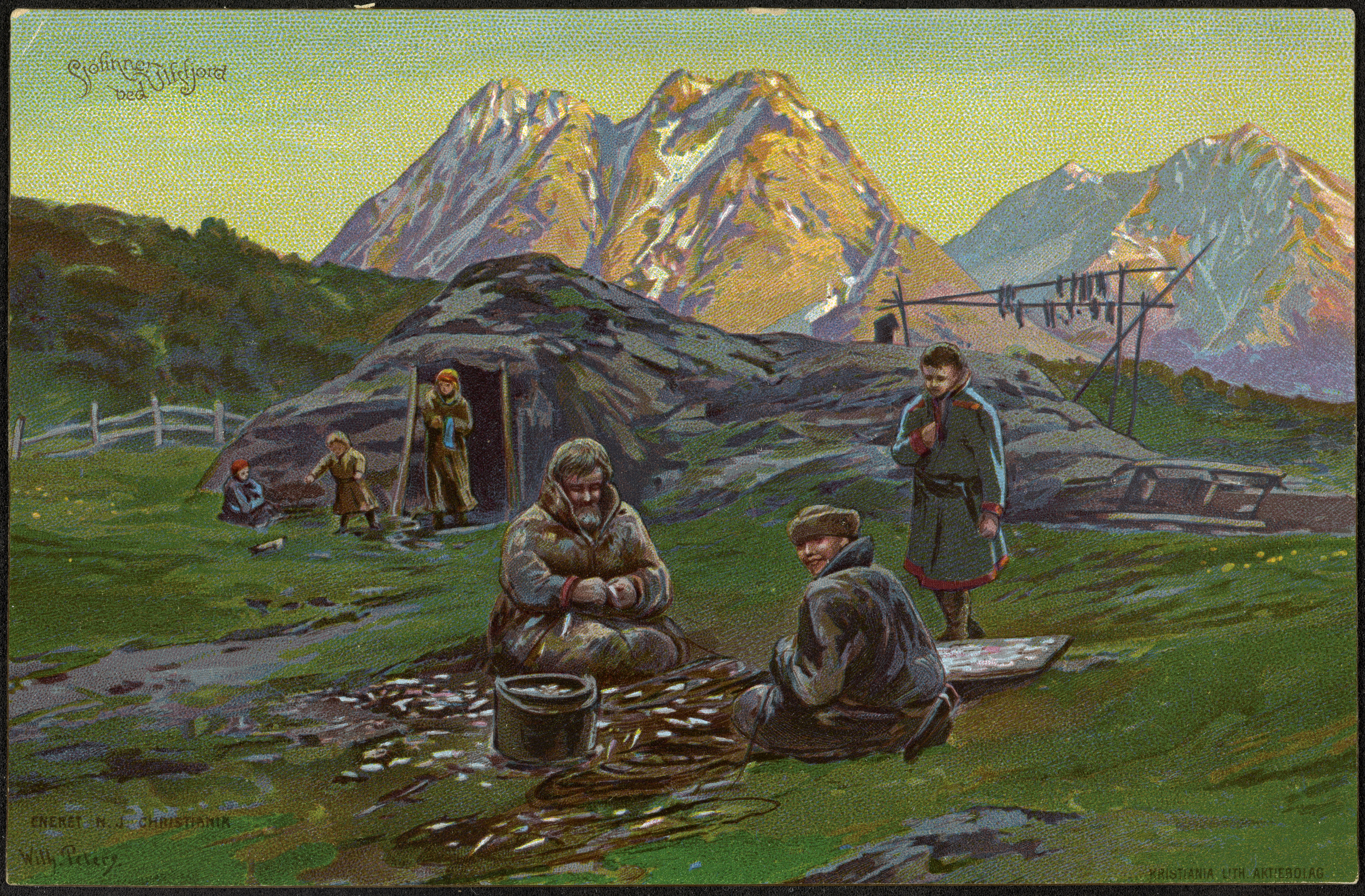
Sami on the Coast at Ulfsfjord

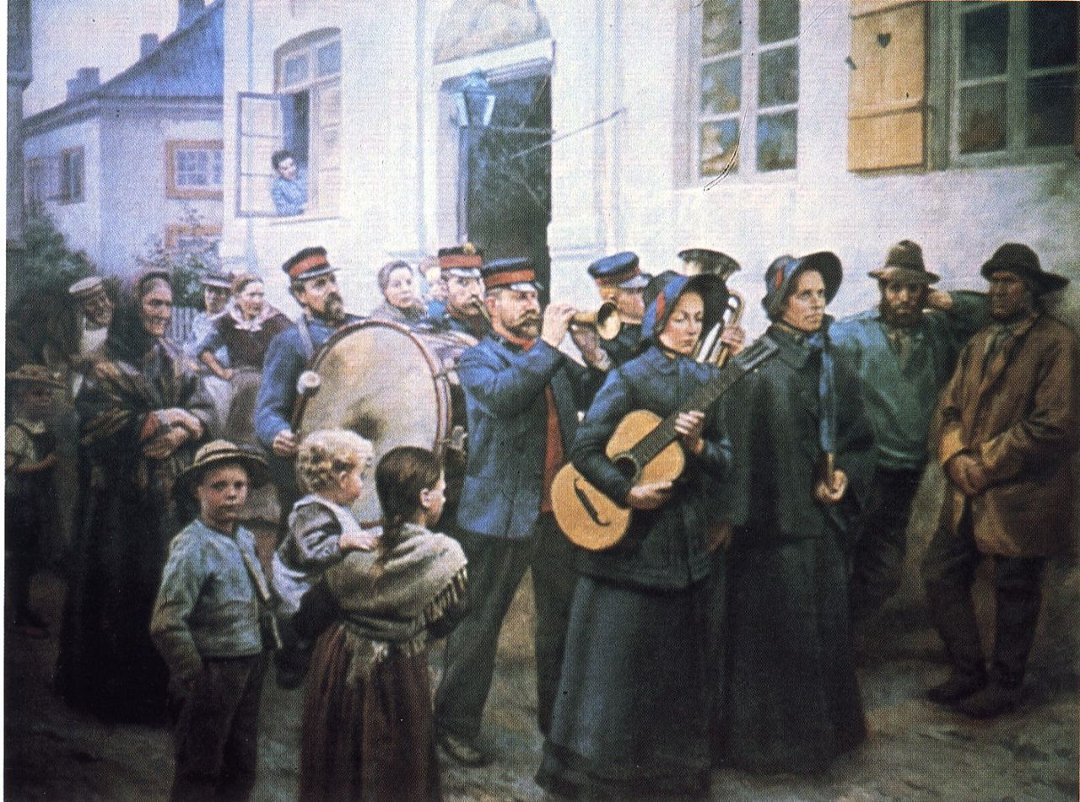
Assault on a Fishing Village

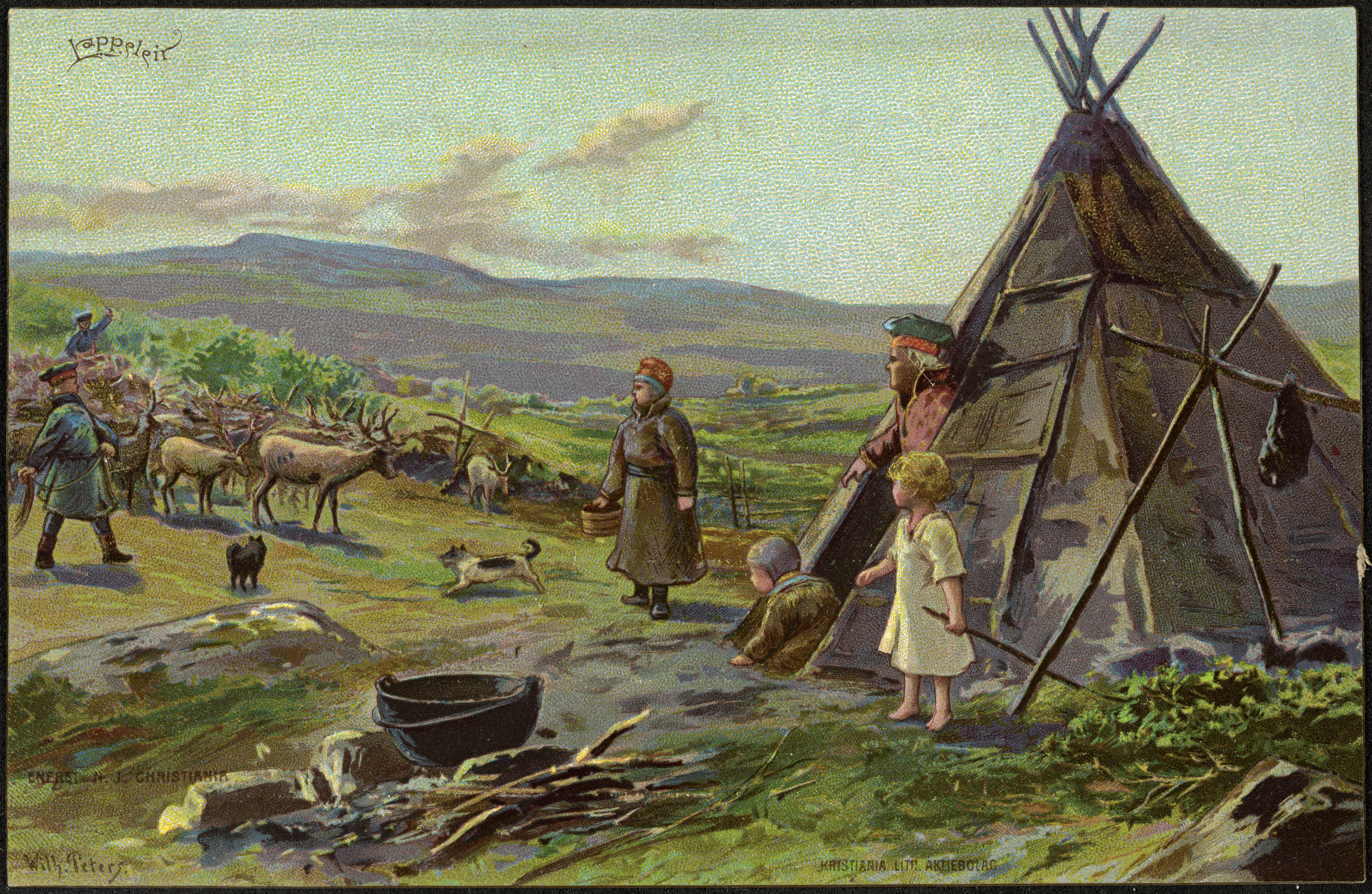
Sami Camp
