= Fredrikstad Cathedral =

Coordinates: 59°12′34″N 10°56′34″E

- Fredrikstad Domkirke
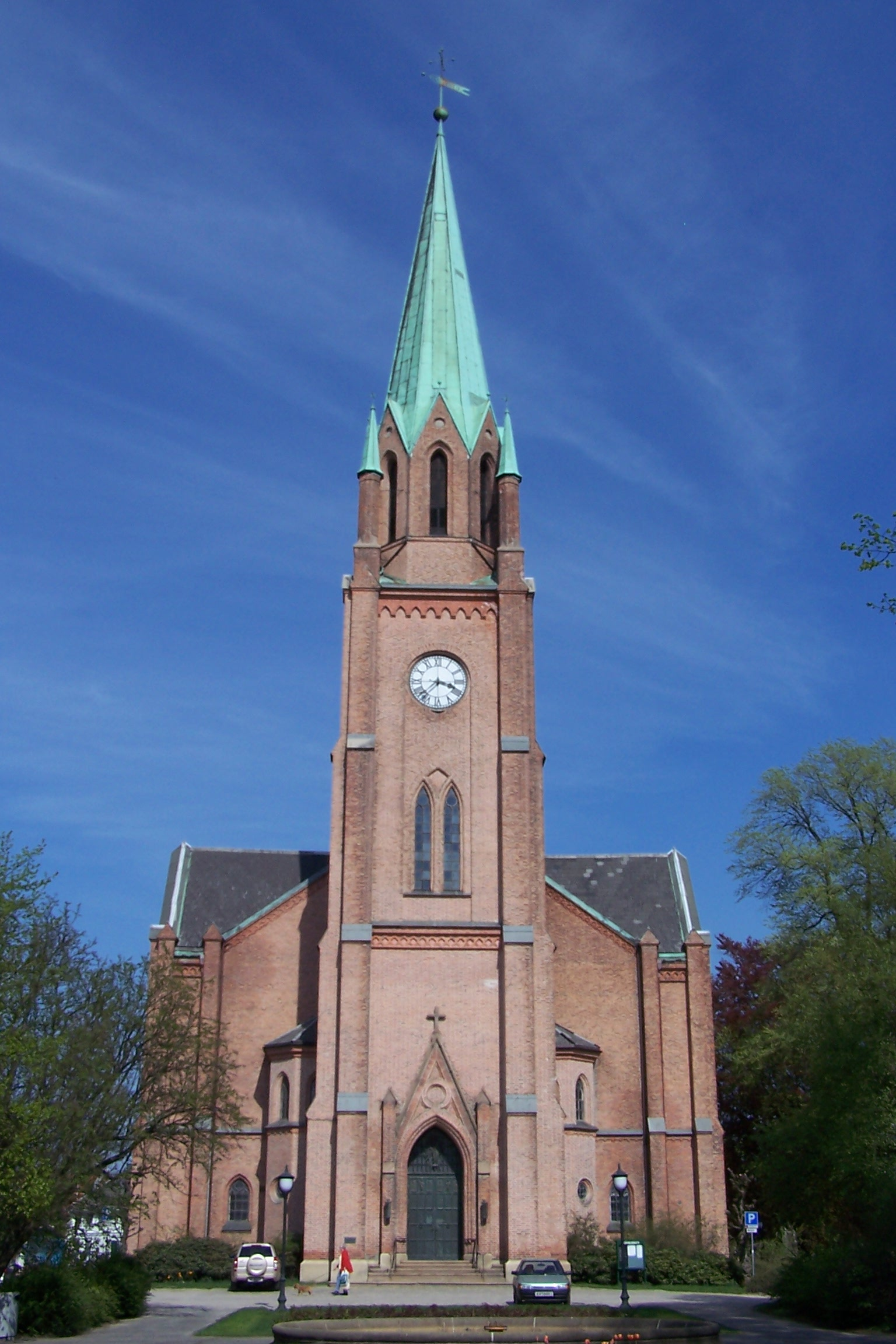
- Fredrikstad Cathedral

- Location of the cathedral Fredrikstad Cathedral (Norway)
- Location: Fredrikstad, Østfold county
- Country: Norway
- Denomination: Church of Norway
- Churchmanship: Evangelical Lutheran
- Website: www.fredrikstaddomkirke.no

History
- Former name: Fredrikstad Vestre Church
- Status: Cathedral

Architecture
- Functional status: Active
- Architect: Ferdinand Waldemar Lühr
- Style: Gothic Revival

Specifications
- Materials: Brick

Administration
- Diocese: Diocese of Borg

Fredrikstad Cathedral (Norwegian: Fredrikstad Domkirke) is a cathedral located in the west of the city of Fredrikstad in Østfold county, Norway. It is the episcopal seat of the Diocese of Borg of the Church of Norway. The church was elevated to cathedral status in 1969 with the creation of the new Diocese of Borg. The cathedral has space for 1100 people.

== History and description ==
The church was originally designed by architect Ferdinand Waldemar Lühr as a parish church. It was built between 1879 and 1880 in the Gothic Revival style in brick, with a floor plan in the form of a Latin cross. It has a single tower of 72 metres in height at the western end, which is part of the main façade. It was consecrated on 13 October 1880 when it was first known as Fredrikstad Vestre kirke ("Fredrikstad west church").

The cathedral features stained glass in the choir by Emanuel Vigeland from 1916 to 1917, a painting by Wilhelm Peters from 1897 and an altarpiece by Waldemar S. Dahl featuring the Four Evangelists, Moses and Aaron and two angels. The church was restored between 1950 and 1954 under the direction of architect Arnstein Arneberg. The pulpit and baptismal font date from the restoration and were carved by Anthon Røvik whose work is also featured in Hamar Cathedral. The previous organ was built by Rieger Orgelbau in 1878. The present organ was built by Marcussen & Søn and was installed during 1964. An Opus 57 choir organ from Ryde og Berg Orgelbyggeri was acquired in 2002.

== See also ==
- List of cathedrals in Norway
