= Diocese of Bjørgvin =

Lutheran diocese of the Church of Norway

Diocese of Bjørgvin Bjørgvin bispedømme
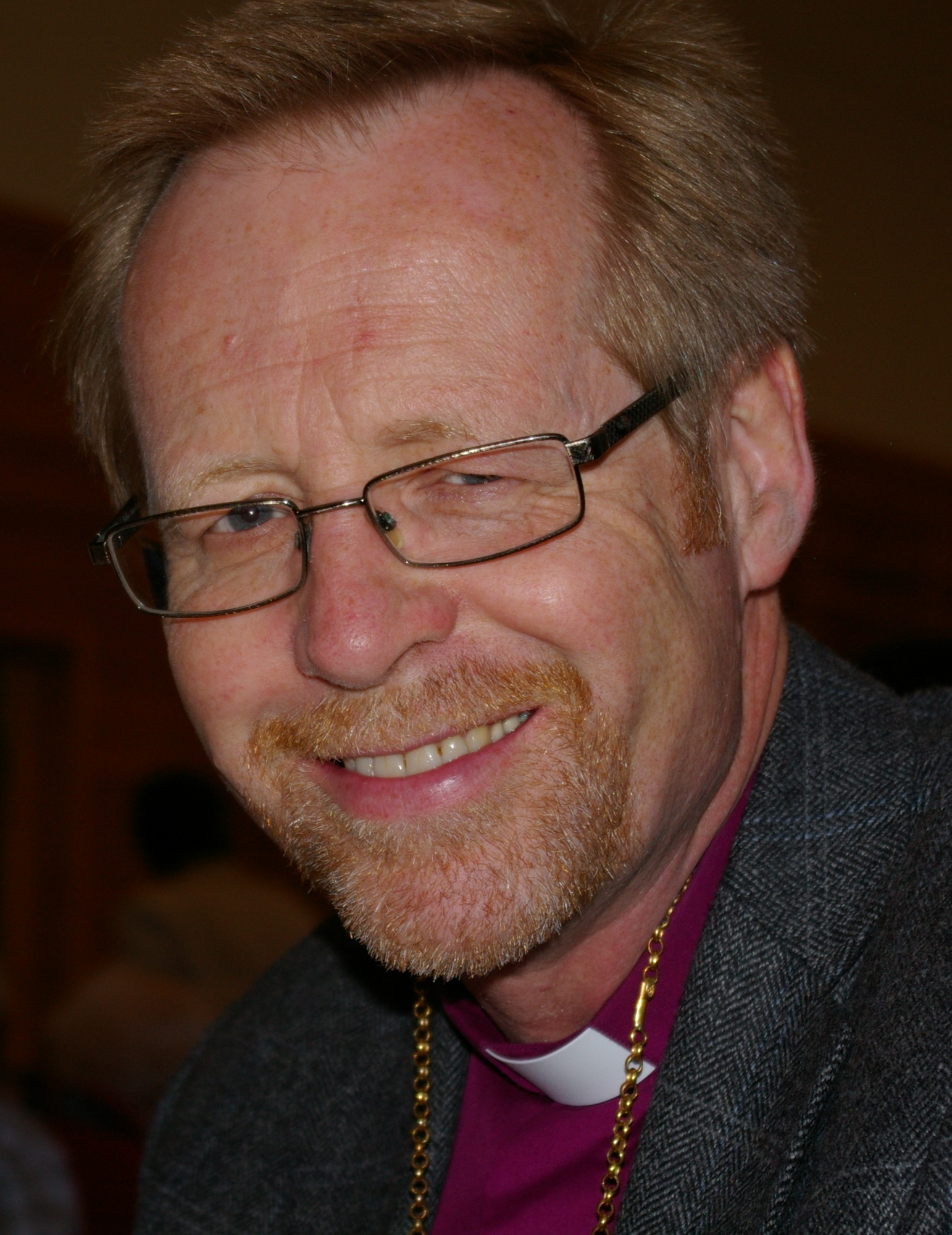
- Former Bishop Halvor Nordhaug

Location
- Country: Norway
- Territory: Vestland county
- Deaneries: 10 prosti

Statistics
- Area: 34,083 km^{2} (13,160 sq mi)
- Parishes: 189
- Members: 481 804

Information
- Denomination: Church of Norway
- Established: 1536
- Cathedral: Bergen Cathedral

Current leadership
- Bishop: Ragnhild Jepsen

Map
- Location of the Diocese of Bjørgvin

Website
- kirken.no/bjorgvin

The Diocese of Bjørgvin (Norwegian: Bjørgvin bispedømme) is one of the 11 dioceses that make up the Church of Norway. It includes all of the churches located in the county of Vestland in Western Norway, and those outside of Norway in the Seamen's Church. The cathedral city is Bergen, Norway's second largest city. Bergen Cathedral, formerly the Church of Saint Olaf, serves as the seat of the presiding Bishop. The Bishop since 2023 has been Ragnhild Jepsen.

== History ==
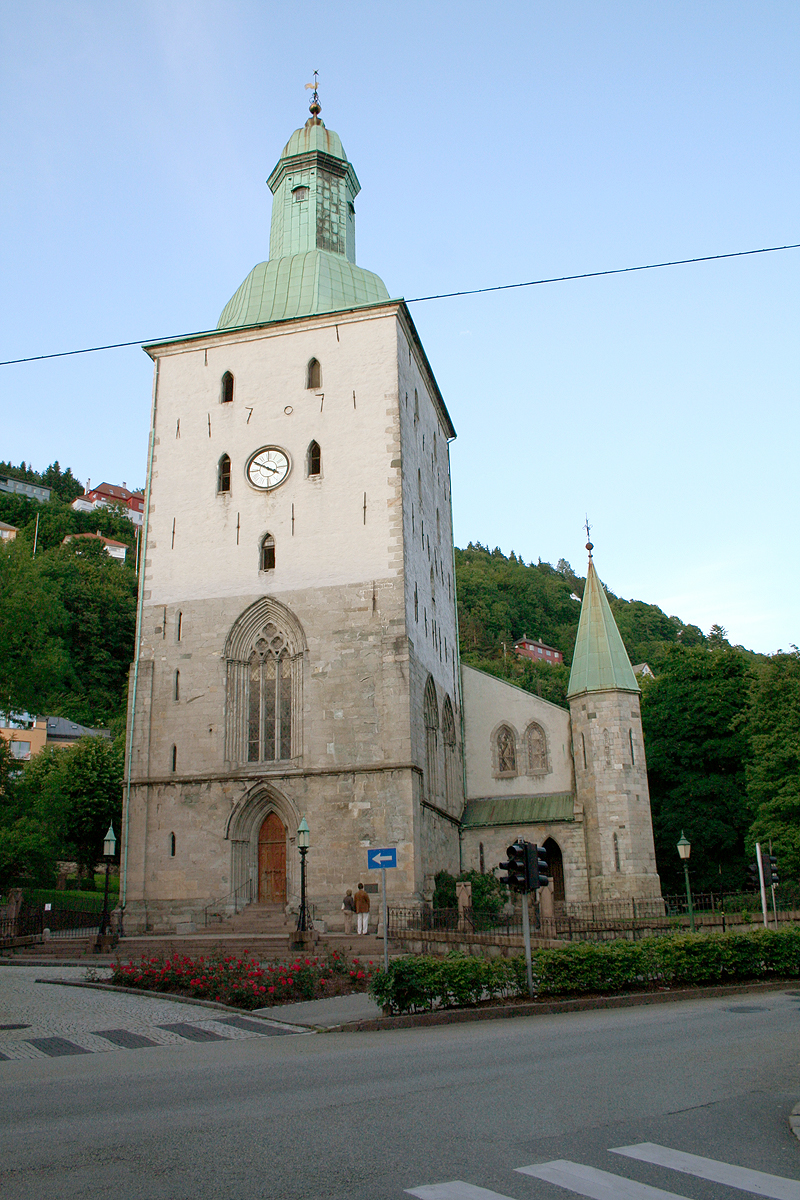
Bergen Cathedral (Bergen domkirke)

Prior to 1536, the state religion of Norway was Roman Catholicism, but the government of the Kingdom of Denmark-Norway joined in with the Protestant Reformation and in 1536 it declared itself to be Lutheran, and the Church of Norway was formed. In 1537, the diocese of Bjørgvin, heir of the ancient Diocese of Bergen, consisted of the (historic) counties of Hordaland and Sogn og Fjordane (with exception of the parishes of Eidfjord and Røldal).

The region of Sunnmøre (to the north) was transferred from the Diocese of Nidaros to the Diocese of Bjørgvin in 1622. The parish of Eidfjord was transferred from the Diocese of Stavanger to Bjørgvin in 1630. The parish of Røldal was transferred from the Diocese of Kristiansand to Bjørgvin in 1863. The Sunnmøre region was removed from the Diocese of Bjørgvin in 1983 when it, along with the regions of Nordmøre and Romsdal (from the Diocese of Nidaros), were established as a separate diocese, the Diocese of Møre.

== Name ==
The Old Norse form of the name for Bergen was Bjǫrgvin. The first element is berg or bjǫrg, which translates as "mountain". The last element is vin, which translates as "meadow". It is an old form of the name for the present-day city of Bergen.

== Structure ==
The Diocese of Bjørgvin is divided into eleven deaneries (Norwegian: Prosti) in the new Vestland county. Each deanery corresponds to one or more municipalities in the diocese. Each municipality is further divided into one or more parishes which each contain one or more congregations. See each municipality below for lists of churches and parishes within them.

Deanery (Prosti)	Municipalities
Bergen domprosti	Bergen
Bergensdalen prosti	Bergen
Åsane prosti	Bergen, Osterøy
Fana prosti	Austevoll, Bergen, Bjørnafjorden
Hardanger og Voss prosti	Eidfjord, Kvam, Samnanger, Ullensvang, Ulvik, Vaksdal, Voss
Sunnhordland prosti	Bømlo, Etne, Fitjar, Kvinnherad, Stord, Sveio, Tysnes
Vesthordland prosti	Askøy, Øygarden
Nordhordland prosti	Alver. Austrheim, Fedje, Masfjorden, Modalen, Gulen, Solund
Sogn prosti	Aurland, Luster, Lærdal, Sogndal, Vik, Årdal
Nordfjord prosti	Bremanger, Gloppen, Kinn, Stad, Stryn
Sunnfjord prosti	Askvoll, Fjaler, Hyllestad, Høyanger, Sunnfjord

== Bishops ==
- Prior to 1535 Olav Torkelsson - The last Catholic bishop
- 1536-1557 Gjeble Pederssøn b. c.1489 - The first Lutheran bishop
- 1557-1582 Jens Pedersen Schjelderup b. 1499
- 1583-1607 Anders Foss
- 1607-1615 Anders Mikkelsen Kolding
- 1616-1636 Nils Paaske b. 1568
- 1636-1649 Ludvig Hansen Munthe b. 1593
- 1649-1665 Jens Pedersen Schjelderup b. 1604
- 1665-1711 Nils Envildsen Randulf b. 1630
- 1711-1716 Nils Pedersen Smed b. 1655
- 1716-1723 Clemens Schmidt b. 1671
- 1723-1731 Marcus Müller b. 1684
- 1731-1747 Oluf Cosmussen Bornemann b. 1683
- 1747-1757 Erik Ludvigsen Pontoppidan b. 1698
- 1757-1762 Ole Tiedemann b. 1710
- 1762-1774 Frederik Arentz b. 1699
- 1774-1778 Eiler Eilersen Hagerup b. 1718
- 1778-1779 Søren Friedlieb b. 1717
- 1779-1803 Ole Irgens b. 1724
- 1803-1816 Johan Nordahl Brun b. 1745
- 1817-1822 Claus Pavels b. 1769
- 1822-1848 Jacob Neumann b. 1772
- 1848-1857 Peder Christian Hersleb Kjerschow b. 1786
- 1858-1863 Jens Matthias Pram Kaurin b. 1804
- 1864-1880 Peter Hersleb Graah Birkeland b. 1807
- 1881-1898 Fredrik Waldemar Hvoslef b. 1825
- 1899-1916 Johan Willoch Erichsen b. 1842
- 1916-1931 Peter Hognestad b. 1866
- 1931-1948 Andreas Fleischer b. 1878
- 1948-1961 Ragnvald Indrebø b. 1891
- 1961-1976 Per Juvkam b. 1907
- 1977-1987 Tor With b. 1918
- 1987-1994 Per Lønning b. 1928
- 1994-2008 Ole Danbolt Hagesæther b. 1941
- 2008-2023 Halvor Nordhaug b. 1953
- Since 2023 Ragnhild Jepsen b. 1969
