= Ivar Braut =

Norwegian Theologian

The Right Reverend Ivar Braut
- Bishop Emeritus of Stavanger
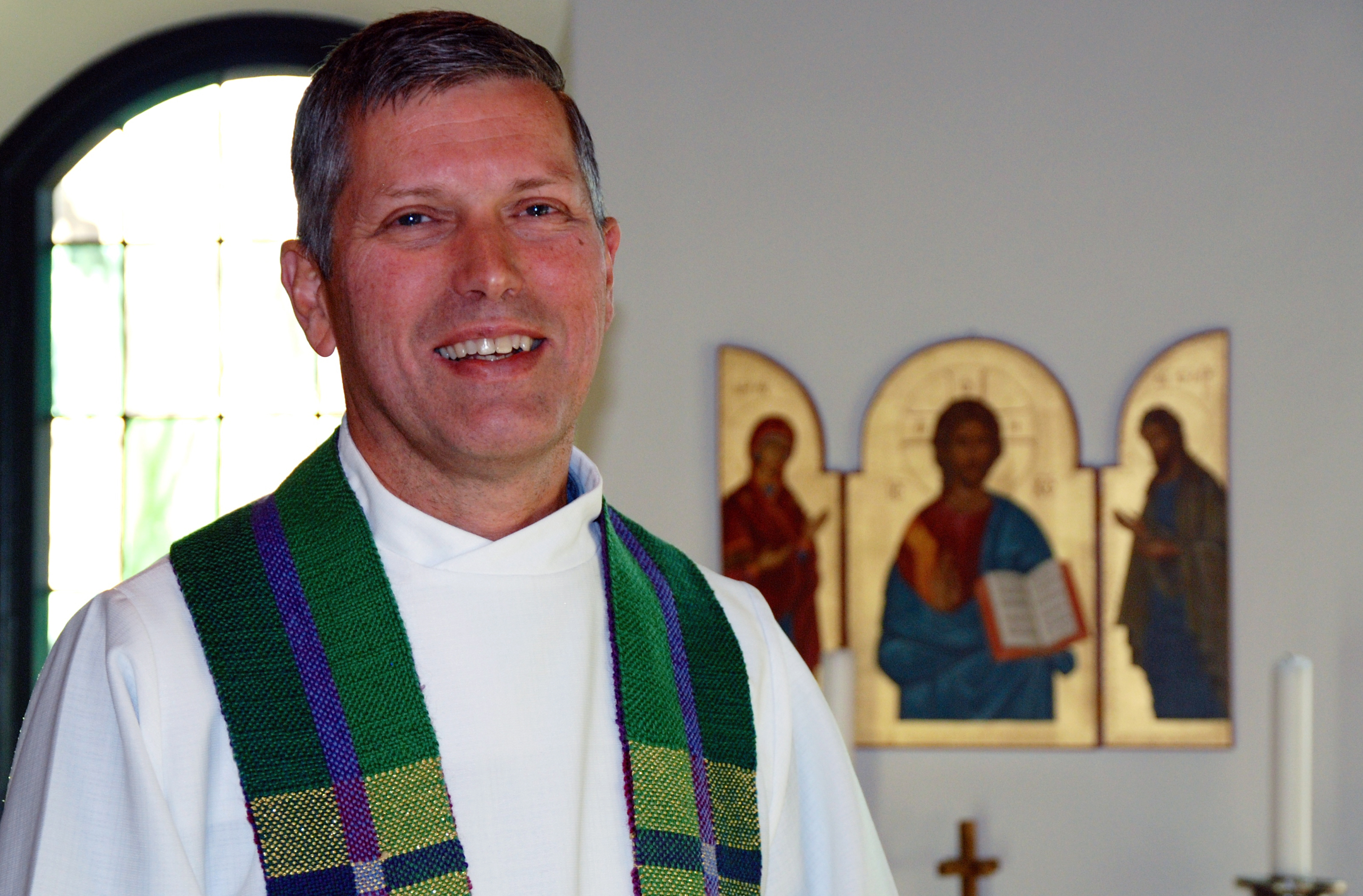
- Church: Church of Norway
- Diocese: Diocese of Stavanger
- Elected: 2017
- In office: 2017–2019
- Predecessor: Erling Pettersen
- Successor: Anne Lise Ådnøy

Orders
- Ordination: 21 June 1981 by Bishop Sigurd Lunde
- Consecration: 19 March 2017

Personal details
- Born: 28 February 1956 (age 70) Sandnes, Norway
- Denomination: Christian
- Occupation: Priest
- Education: MF Norwegian School of Theology (Cand.theol.)

Ivar Braut (born 1956) is a Norwegian theologian and priest. He was the Bishop of the Diocese of Stavanger from 2017 to 2019. He is considered to be a conservative bishop, a contrast to his predecessor.

== Personal life ==
Ivar Braut was born on 28 February 1956 in Sandnes, Norway. He is married to Turid Bakke and together they have three grown children and six grandchildren.

== Education and career ==
He received his Cand.theol. degree from the MF Norwegian School of Theology. He was ordained on 21 June 1981 at Gand Church by the Bishop Sigurd Lunde. His first job was the vicar of Søndre Skøyen in Oslo. From 1982 to 1987, he was a chaplain at Fossum Church in Oslo. Then in 1988, he moved to Grimstad to teach theology at the Grimstad Bible School. He worked there until 1991 when he moved to Trondheim to work at the Ilen Church as a chaplain. From 1994 to 2000 he was the parish priest for Stord Municipality as well as the dean for Sunnhordland deanery. From 2000 to 2017, he was the senior parish priest for the Birkeland parish in Bergen Municipality. On 8 December 2016, he was named to the post of Bishop of the Diocese of Stavanger, replacing the retiring Bishop Erling Johan Pettersen. Braut was consecrated as bishop on 19 March 2017 in the Stavanger Cathedral. He stepped down in 2019 as a result of eyesight problems.

Religious titles
Preceded by Erling Johan Pettersen	Bishop of Stavanger; 2017-2019	Succeeded by Anne Lise Ådnøy
