= Jacob Christian Petersen =

Norwegian theologian (1870–1964)

Right Reverend Jacob Christian Petersen
- Bishop
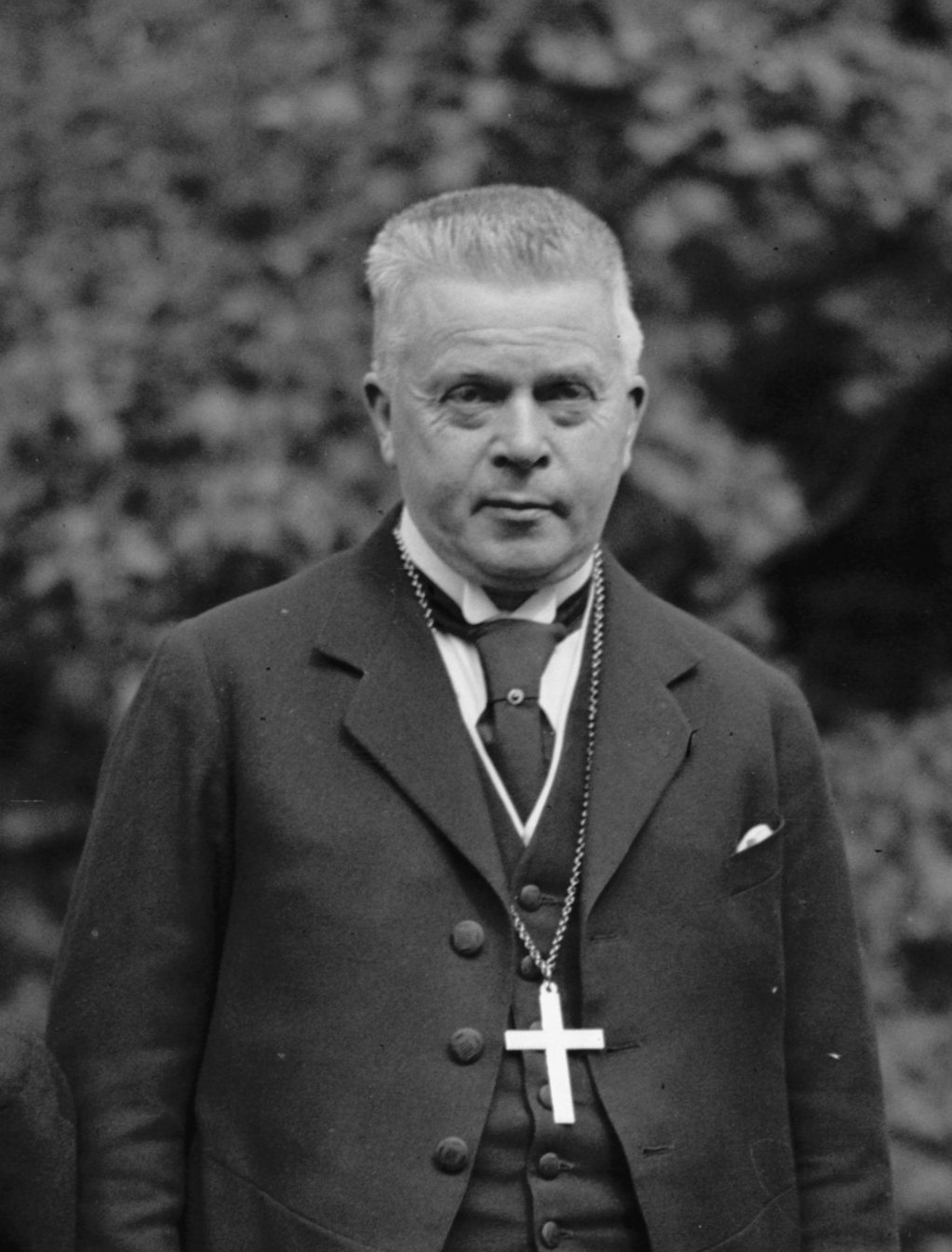
- Church: Church of Norway
- Diocese: Diocese of Stavanger

Personal details
- Born: 22 February 1870 Drammen, Norway
- Died: 1 January 1964 (aged 93)
- Denomination: Christian
- Occupation: Priest

Jacob Christian Petersen or J.C. Petersen was a Norwegian theologian and priest. He served as the first Bishop of the (modern-day) Diocese of Stavanger from its re-establishment in 1925 until his retirement in 1940.

== Personal life ==
Jacob Christian Petersen was born on 22 February 1870 in Drammen, Norway to the merchant Peter Petersen and his wife Kristine Marie Svendsen. He married Sara Marie Myhre in 1900.

== Education and career ==
He began his theological studies in 1888 and received his cand.theol. degree in 1894. He was a teacher in Kristiania from 1895 to 1897. Then he was assistant priest at Våler Church in Våler Municipality in 1897 for one year. Next, he was hired as a chaplain serving the parish for Vang Municipality in Hedmark county. Then in 1905, be moved to Norddal Municipality in Sunnmøre to be the parish priest. In 1910 he became the parish priest for Stranda Municipality and a year later he was called to be the dean of the Østre Sunnmøre deanery, a job he held from 1911 to 1919. In 1919, he was called to be the parish priest at St. Petri Church in Stavanger. During that time, he was also the chairman of the Norwegian Missionary Society from 1921 until 1923 and again in 1928. In 1924, it was decided that the large Diocese of Kristiansand was going to be divided with all of Rogaland county becoming the newly re-established Diocese of Stavanger which had been dormant since 1682. On 1 January 1925, the new diocese came into existence and Jacob Christian Petersen was appointed to be its first Bishop. He was the first "Bishop of Stavanger" since Jacob Jensen Jersin in 1682. Petersen retired in 1940 and he lived until the age of 94. He died in 1964.

Religious titles
New diocese Split off from the Diocese of Kristiansand; Title last held by Jacob Jensen Jersin (1682)	Bishop of Stavanger; 1925–1940	Succeeded by Gabriel Skagestad
