= Bjørn Bue =

Norwegian Lutheran missionary and bishop

Rt. Rev. Bjørn Bue
- Bishop
- Church: Church of Norway
- Diocese: Diocese of Stavanger
- Appointed: 1986
- In office: 1986–1997
- Predecessor: Sigurd Lunde
- Successor: Ernst Baasland
- Previous post: Missionary to Cameroon

Personal details
- Born: 30 January 1934 Sola, Norway
- Died: 13 April 1997 (aged 63) Stavanger, Norway
- Denomination: Christian
- Parents: Jonas Bue and Teresia Svela
- Spouse: Else-Marie Joa
- Occupation: Priest
- Education: MF Norwegian School of Theology (Cand.theol. (1960))

Bjørn Bue (30 January 1934 – 13 April 1997) was a Norwegian Lutheran missionary and bishop. He was born in Sola Municipality. He served as Bishop of the Diocese of Stavanger from 1986 to 1997. He died in Stavanger in 1997. He is remembered for his struggle to defend human rights and against poverty and injustice.

== Biography ==
Bjørn Bue was born on 30 January 1934 to Jonas Bue (1886–1943) and Teresia Svela (1891–1972) in Sola Municipality in Rogaland county, Norway. He went to school in Bryne to study the Russian language (at the height of the Cold War in the 1950s), but after one year he decided to give that up and become a missionary and pastor. He went to the Mission School in Stavanger in 1955 and then transferred to the MF Norwegian School of Theology in Oslo. He graduated from there in 1960 with a cand.theol. degree.

His first job was as a missionary for the Norwegian Missionary Society and he was stationed in Cameroon. Before going to Cameroon, he studied the French language in France in 1960–1961, and then he arrived in Cameroon in late 1961. He and his wife served in Cameroon until 1979, with only a few brief trips home to Norway during that time. They worked in the villages of Tibati, Yoko, and finally in Ngaoundéré.

In 1980, Bue began a new job as the priest at the 2-year old Gand Church in Sandnes Municipality, Norway. He continued in that job until 1986, when he was named the Bishop of the Diocese of Stavanger. As bishop, he was based at the Stavanger Cathedral in Stavanger. Bue was bishop in Stavanger from 1986 until his death on 13 April 1997.

Religious titles
| Preceded by Sigurd Lunde | Bishop of Stavanger; 1986–1997 | Succeeded by Ernst Oddvar Baasland |
