= Veavågen Church =

Church in Rogaland, Norway

- Veavågen kirke
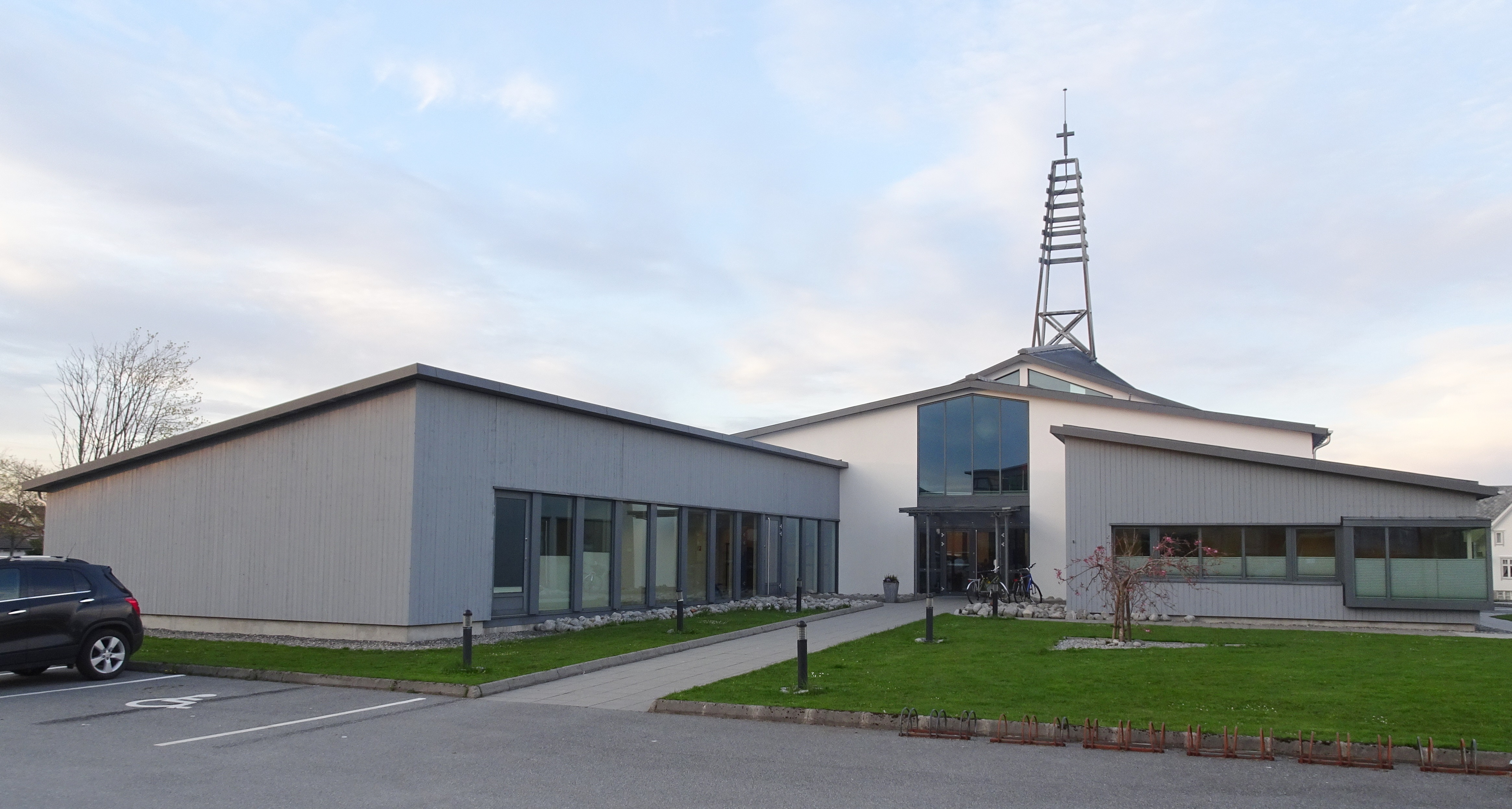
- View of the church
- Veavågen Church
- 59.29234°N 5.228431°E
- Location: Karmøy Municipality, Rogaland
- Country: Norway
- Denomination: Church of Norway
- Churchmanship: Evangelical Lutheran

History
- Status: Parish church
- Founded: 2009
- Consecrated: 2009

Architecture
- Functional status: Active
- Architect(s): Brandsberg; Dahls Arkitekter
- Architectural type: Long church
- Completed: 2009

Specifications
- Capacity: 280
- Materials: Concrete

Administration
- Diocese: Stavanger bispedømme
- Deanery: Karmøy prosti
- Parish: Veavågen

Veavågen Church (Norwegian: Veavågen kirke) is a parish church of the Church of Norway in Karmøy Municipality in Rogaland county, Norway. It is located in the village of Veavågen on the western coast of the island of Karmøy. It is the church for the Veavågen parish which is part of the Karmøy prosti (arch-deanery) in the Diocese of Stavanger. The concrete church was approved in 2007 and built in a long church style in 2009, using designs by the architectural firm Brandsberg Dahls-Arkitekter. The church seats about 280 people.

The elementary school right besides it uses the building for classrooms, as the school does not have enough classrooms for all of the student body.

== See also ==
- List of churches in Rogaland
