= Bjarte Baasland =

Norwegian businessman (1974–2026)

- Born: 5 March 1974; Norway
- Died: 26 February 2026 (aged 51); Oslo, Norway
- Occupation: Former businessman
- Spouse: Bodhild Baasland
- Status: Convicted
- Criminal charges: Fraud
- Penalty: Sentenced to four years in prison

Bjarte Baasland (5 March 1974 – 26 February 2026) was a Norwegian businessman and convicted fraudster.

== Life and career ==
Baasland became famous in Norway in connection with the Baasland case in the autumn of 2008, when it was revealed that he had gambled away almost 60 million kr (more than €7 million) that he borrowed from family friends and banks.

He was the son of Ernst Baasland, who at the time was a Bishop of Stavanger in the Church of Norway. A consequence of the Baasland case was that Ernst Baasland resigned as Bishop and went personally bankrupt along with his wife, Bodhild Baasland, who is also under investigation for fraud. On 2 October 2009, Bjarte Baasland was convicted of fraud and sentenced to 4 years in prison and to return NOK 26,6 million to one of his creditors, Cecilie Nustad.

Baasland died on 26 February 2026, at the age of 51.
