= Åna-Sira Church =

Church in Rogaland, Norway

- Åna-Sira kirke
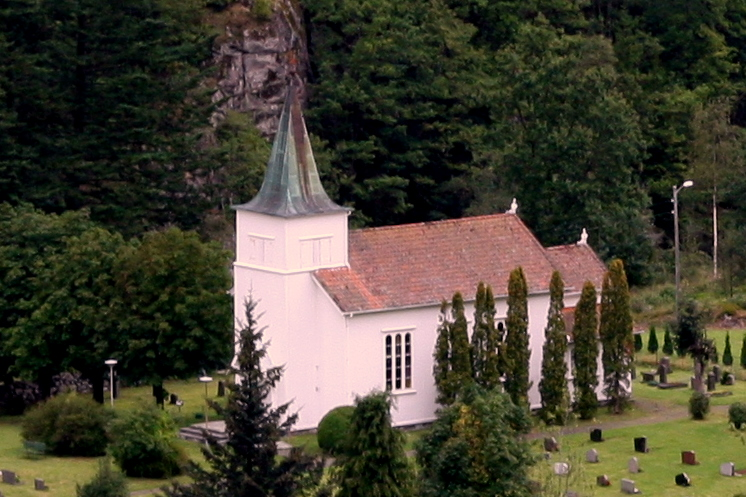
- View of the church
- Åna-Sira Church
- 58.29339°N 06.4420867°E
- Location: Sokndal Municipality, Rogaland
- Country: Norway
- Denomination: Church of Norway
- Churchmanship: Evangelical Lutheran

History
- Status: Parish church
- Founded: 1888
- Consecrated: 16 Mar 1888

Architecture
- Functional status: Active
- Architect: Jacob Wilhelm Nordan
- Architectural type: Long church
- Completed: 1888 (138 years ago)

Specifications
- Capacity: 150
- Materials: Wood

Administration
- Diocese: Stavanger bispedømme
- Deanery: Dalane prosti
- Parish: Sokndal
- Norwegian Cultural Heritage Site
- Type: Church
- Status: Not protected
- ID: 85971

Åna-Sira Church (Norwegian: Åna-Sira kirke) is a parish church of the Church of Norway in Sokndal Municipality in Rogaland county, Norway. It is located in the village of Åna-Sira, on the northwest shore of the river Sira on the border with Agder county. It is one of the two churches for the Sokndal parish which is part of the Dalane prosti (deanery) in the Diocese of Stavanger. The white, wooden church was built in a long church style in 1888 using designs by the architect Jacob Wilhelm Nordan. The church seats about 100 people. The church was consecrated on 16 March 1888.

== Media gallery ==
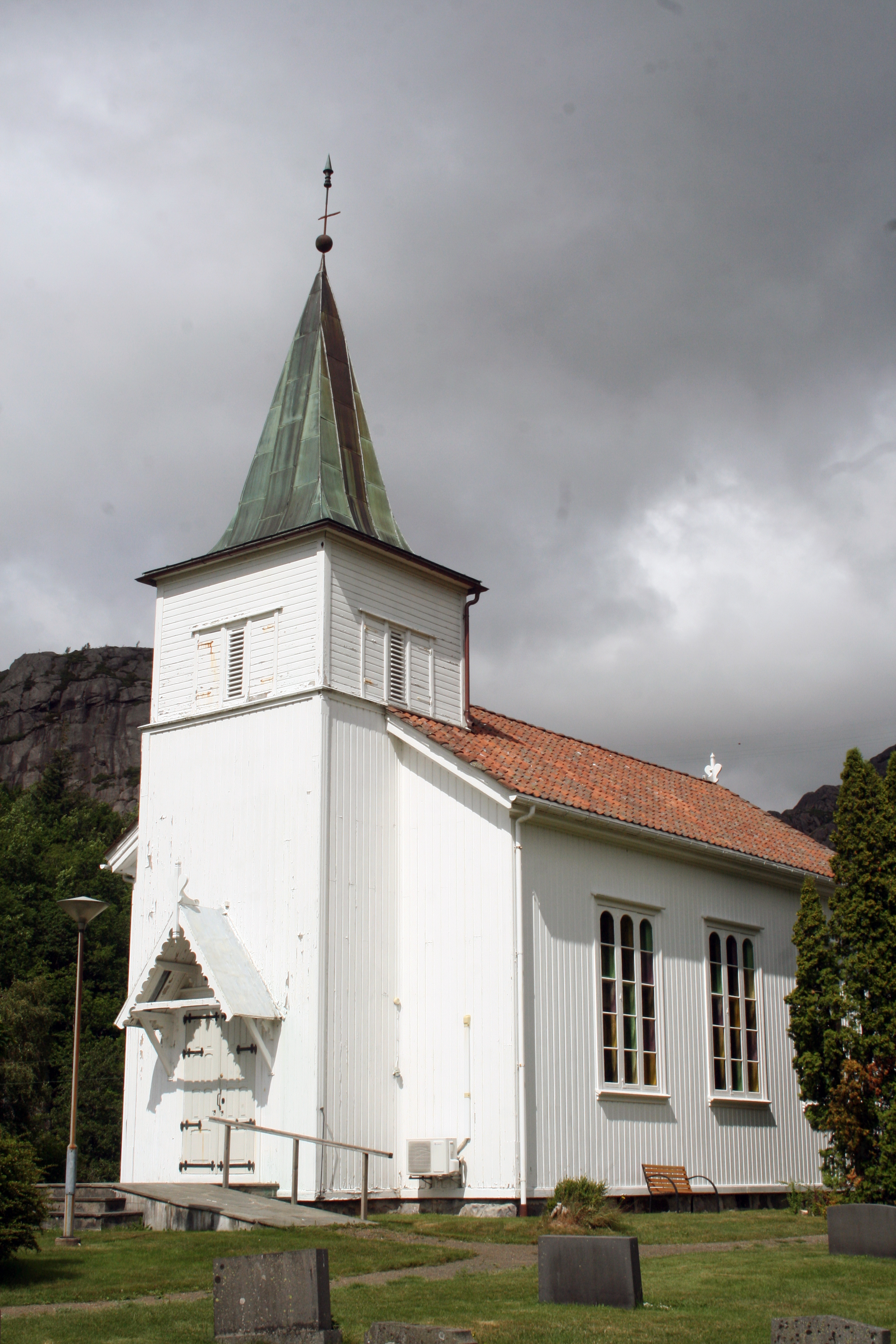

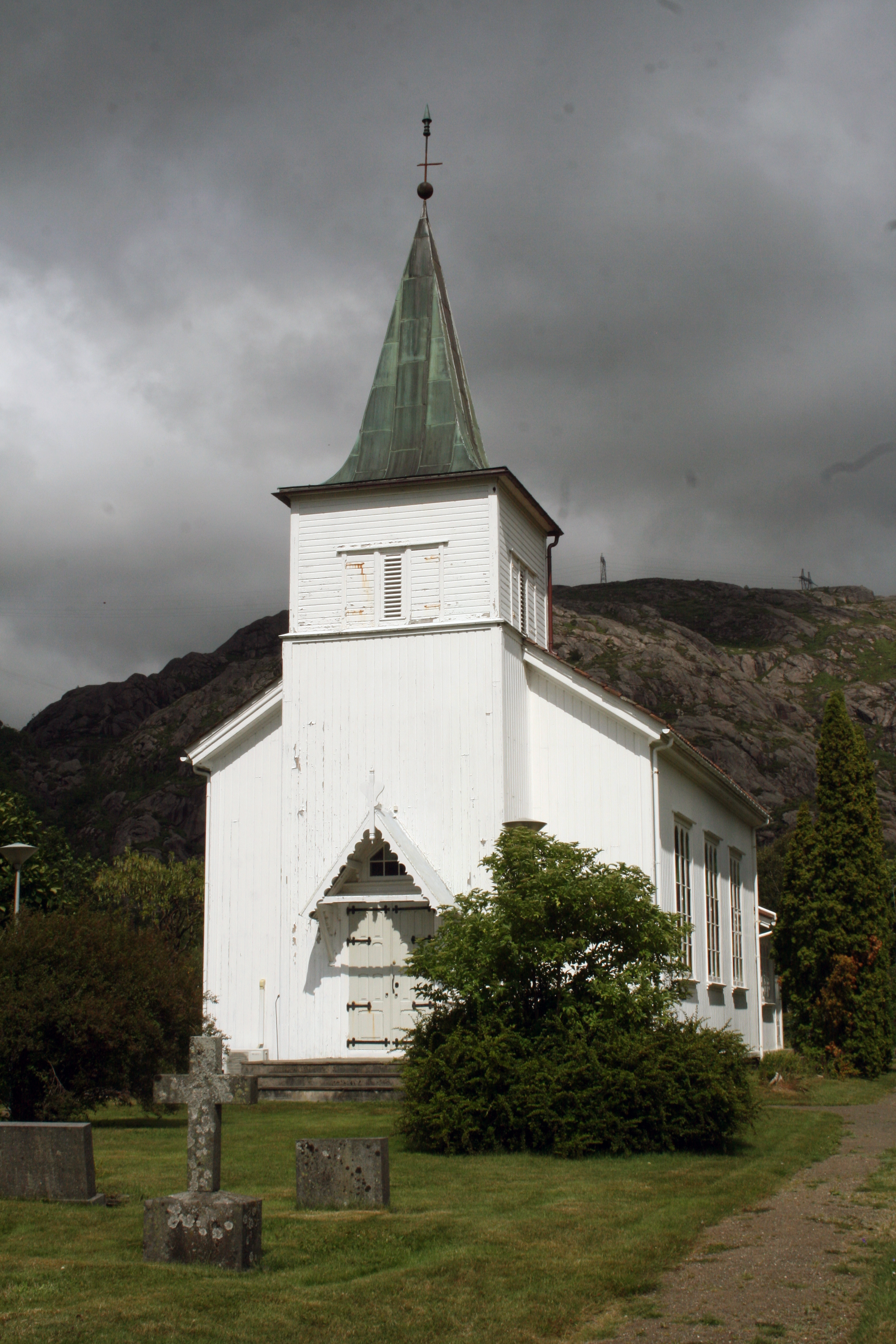

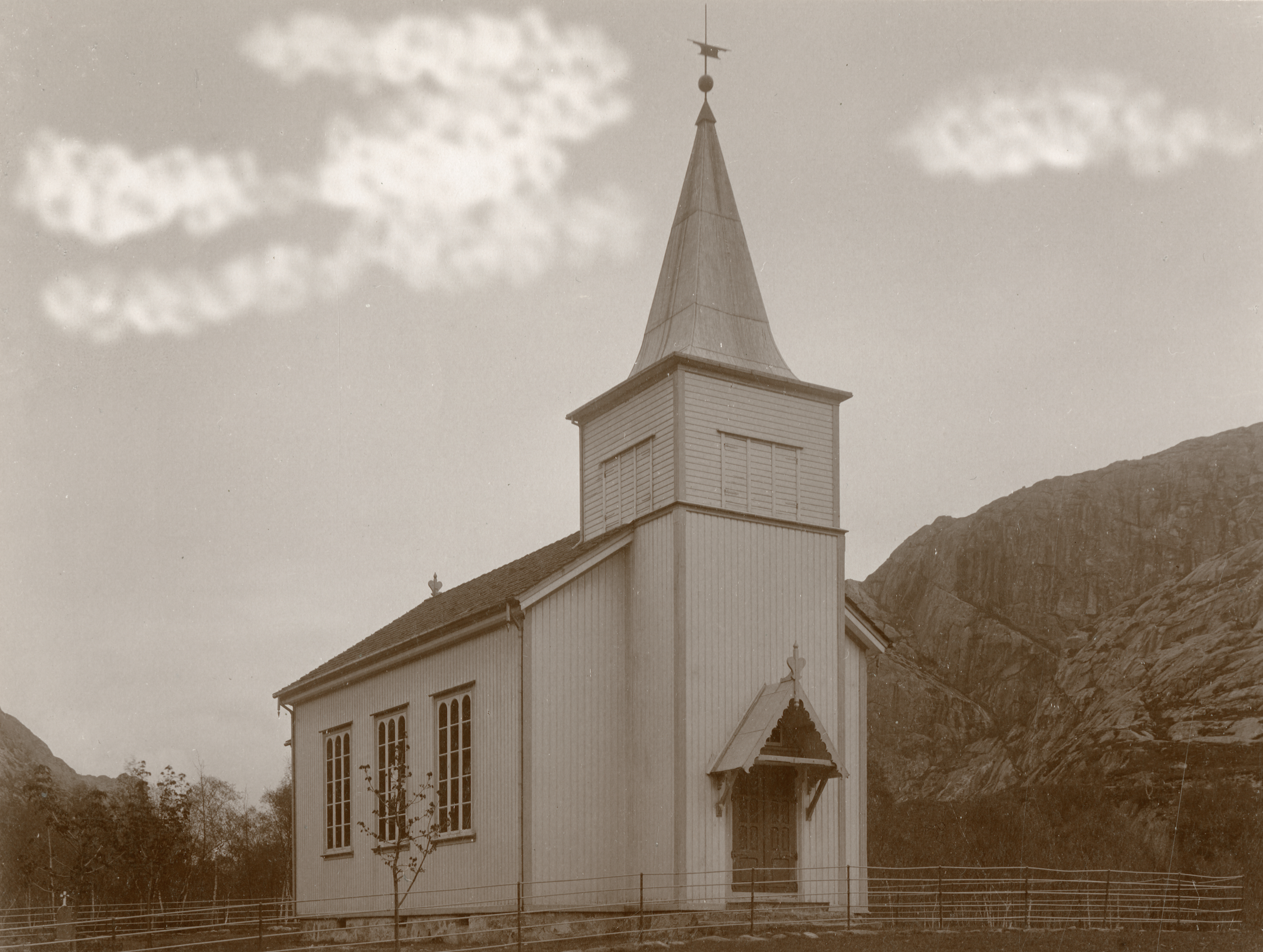

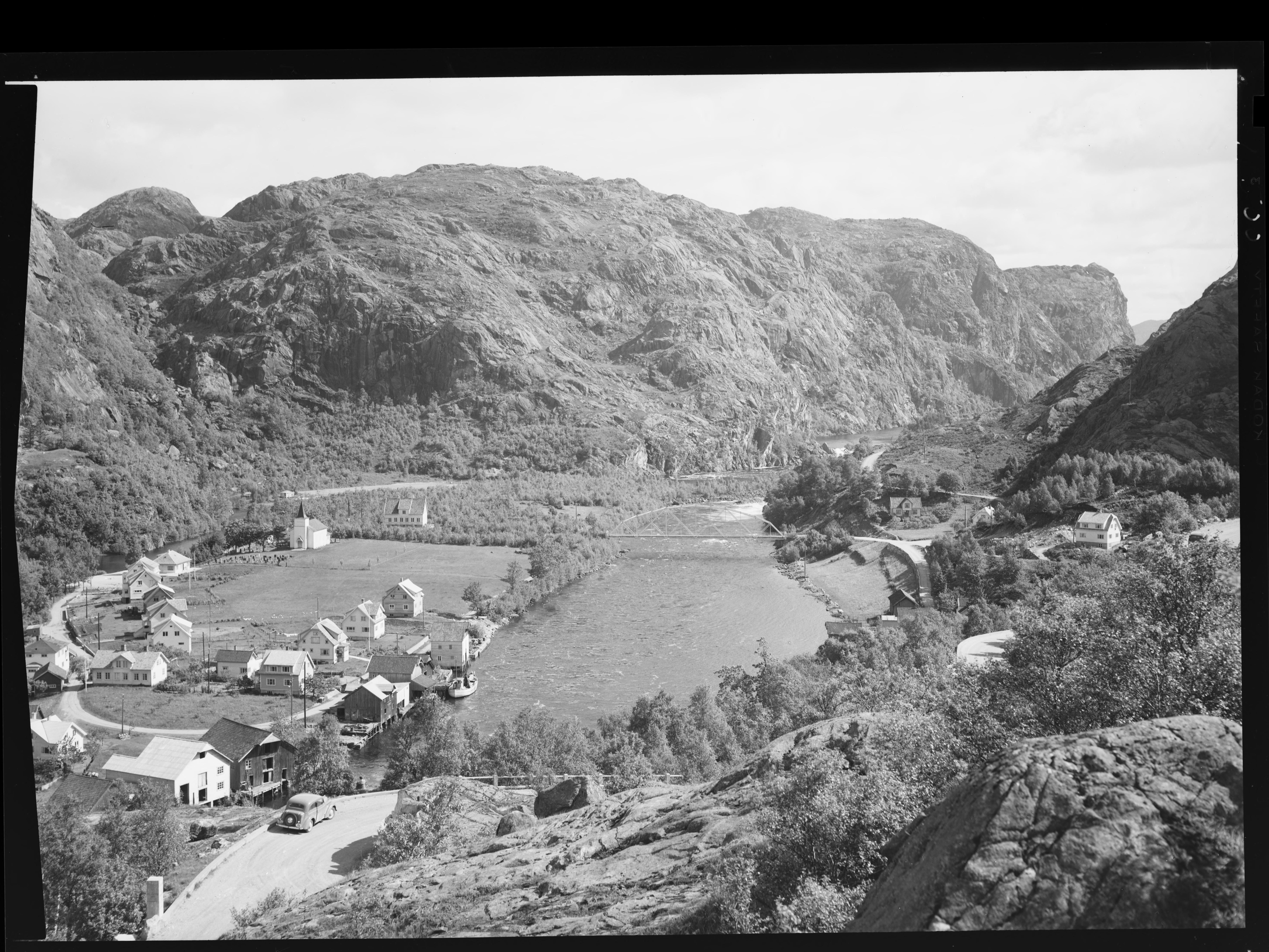

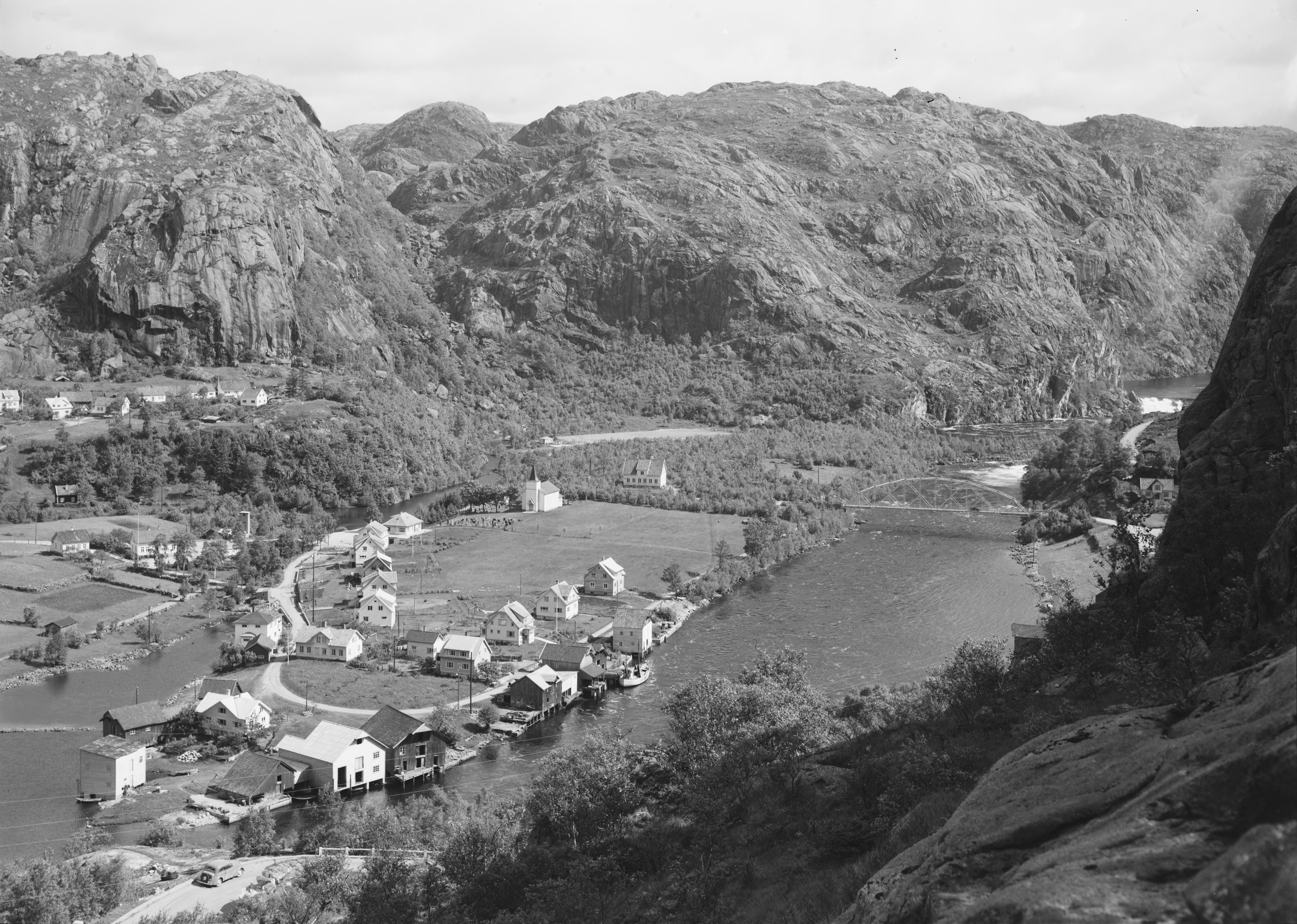

== See also ==
- List of churches in Rogaland
