= Karl Marthinussen =

Right Reverend Karl Marthinussen
- Bishop
- Church: Church of Norway
- Diocese: Diocese of Stavanger

Personal details
- Born: 26 November 1890 Bergen, Norway
- Died: 1 January 1965 (aged 74)
- Denomination: Christian
- Occupation: Priest

Karl Marthinussen (1890–1965) was a Norwegian theologian and priest. He served as a bishop of the Diocese of Stavanger from 1949 until 1960.

== Personal life ==
Bishop Marthinussen was born on 26 November 1890 in Bergen, Norway. He was married to Borghild Haugland. He died in 1965.

== Education and career ==
He graduated from the University of Christiania in 1914 with a Cand.theol. degree. He was hired as a priest at the St. Jakob parish in Bergen from 1916 until 1930. In 1932, he became the parish priest for the Sandvik Church parish in Bergen. In 1934, he was named the chairman for the Christian Democratic Party in Bergen. He worked at the Sandvik Church until 1948 when he was appointed the Bishop of the Diocese of Stavanger. He held the post of bishop in Stavanger from 1949 until his retirement in 1960. He was succeeded by Fridtjov Birkeli.

Religious titles
Preceded by Gabriel Skagestad	Bishop of Stavanger; 1949–1960	Succeeded by Fridtjov Birkeli
