= Gabriel Skagestad =

Norwegian theologian

Right Reverend Gabriel Skagestad
- Bishop
- Church: Church of Norway
- Diocese: Diocese of Stavanger

Personal details
- Born: 25 November 1879 Holme, Norway
- Died: 30 December 1952 (aged 73)
- Denomination: Christian
- Occupation: Priest

Gabriel Skagestad was a Norwegian theologian and priest. He served as a bishop of the Diocese of Stavanger from 1940 until 1949. Skagestad was a key figure in the resistance movement of the church during the German occupation of Norway.

== Personal life ==
Gabriel Skagestad was born on 25 November 1879 in Holme Municipality in southern Norway. His parents were Tønnes Andreas Gulovsen Skagestad and his wife Else Knutsdatter. In 1913 he married Torborg Konsmo.

== Education and career ==
He began his theological education in 1899 and he received his cand.theol. degree in 1903. His first job was as a chaplain in Hadsel Municipality from 1903 to 1906. Next, he was a chaplain in Lyngdal Municipality from 1906 to 1909. He was a priest in Hetland Municipality from 1909 until 1913. From 1913 to 1922, he was the priest for the parish of Pipervika in Oslo. In 1922, he became the parish priest for Mandal Municipality. He held that job for four years. In 1926, he was called to become a professor at the MF Norwegian School of Theology seminary in Oslo. From 1933 to 1940, he served as the parish priest for the Saint Mark's Church in Oslo. In 1940, he was appointed to be the Bishop of the Diocese of Stavanger.

As bishop, during the German occupation of Norway, Skagestad worked against the collaborations with the Quisling regime and its interference with the priesthood. Together with the other bishops of the Norwegian Church in 1942, he resigned his official government post as a bishop, but continued his ecclesiastical role as bishop. The government appointed Ole Johan Berntsen Kvasnes in 1942 as the new bishop. He was one of the priests who remained loyal to the new state government. Kvasnes retired as bishop on 5 December 1943. Bishop Kvasnes received little popular acceptance and the majority of the priests regarded themselves as Skagestad's men. During this time, Skagestad was held in Tonstad in Sirdal and later in Helgøya, along with many other bishops. After the war, Skagestad resumed his official role as bishop for the diocese. He retired in 1949 and died in 1952.

Religious titles
Preceded by Jacob Christian Petersen	Bishop of Stavanger; 1940–1949	Succeeded by Karl Marthinussen
