= Ernst Oddvar Baasland =

Norwegian bishop

Rt. Rev. Ernst Oddvar Baasland
- Bishop
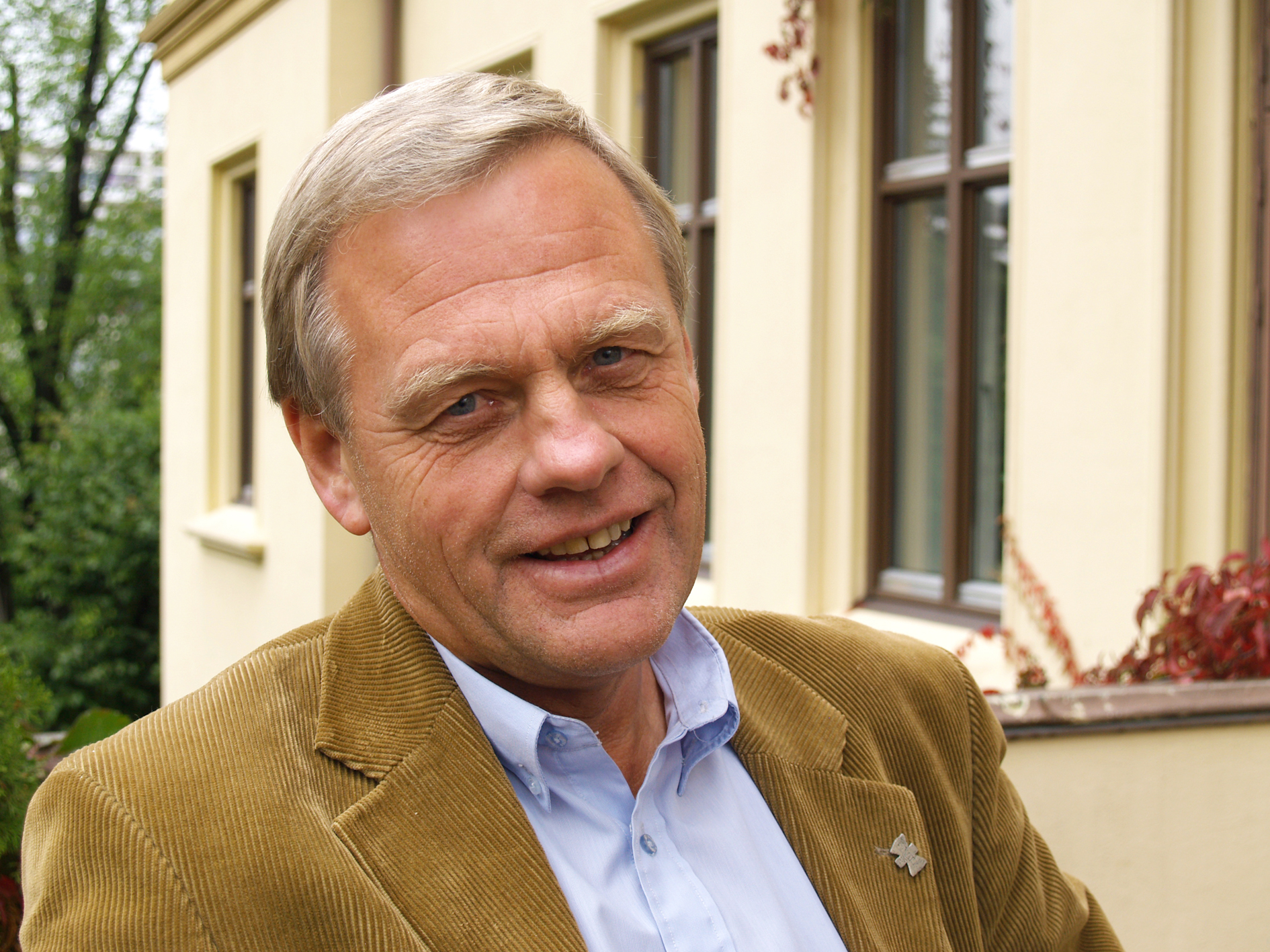
- Ernst Oddvar Baasland
- Church: Church of Norway
- Diocese: Diocese of Stavanger
- Appointed: 1998
- In office: 1998–2009
- Predecessor: Bjørn Bue
- Successor: Erling Pettersen

Orders
- Ordination: 1998
- Consecration: 1998

Personal details
- Born: 3 April 1945 (age 81) Kristiansand, Norway
- Denomination: Christian
- Occupation: Professor
- Education: MF Norwegian School of Theology

Ernst Oddvar Baasland (born 3 April 1945 in Kristiansand, Norway) was the Bishop of the Diocese of Stavanger in the Church of Norway from 1998 to 2009. He resigned from his position on 15 June 2009, following the Baasland case involving his son Bjarte Baasland.

== Biography ==
Ernst Oddvar Baasland was born 3 April 1945 in the city of Kristiansand in Vest-Agder county, Norway. He took his Examen artium in Oslo and passed. He went on to study theology in Oslo at the Misjonsskolen, at the University of Erlangen-Nuremberg, and at the University of Tübingen. He returned to Oslo and graduated from the MF Norwegian School of Theology with a cand.theol. degree in 1970. He again graduated with his Doctor of Theology degree in 1981 at the University of Oslo. He graduated from the Practical Theological Seminary at MF in 1984.

He first served in the Norwegian Army as an Army Chaplain from 1971 to 1972) in Bodø before returning to MF Norwegian School of Theology where he became a research fellow from 1972 to 1975. He had different positions as a lecturer there before finished his doctorate in the New Testament in 1981. He was named professor of the New Testament in 1984. He stayed in this position until becoming ordained as a priest and consecrated a bishop in the diocese of Stavanger in 1998. It was unusual in the Church of Norway for someone to be ordained as a priest just a few days prior to becoming a bishop, but his extensive background in theology as a professor assured many that he was ready to be a priest.

He held the post until 15 June 2009 when he resigned amid a family scandal involving his son, Bjarte Baasland. Since his resignation he has gone back to teaching as a visiting professor at various schools including at Stellenbosch University in South Africa and Humboldt University in Berlin.

Religious titles
| Preceded by Bjørn Bue | Bishop of Stavanger; 1998–2009 | Succeeded by Erling Pettersen |
