= Jacob Jensen Jersin =

Danish-Norwegian bishop (1633–1694)

Right Reverend Jacob Jensen Jersin
- Bishop
- Church: Church of Norway
- Diocese: Diocese of Christianssand

Personal details
- Born: 5 July 1633 Ribe, Denmark
- Died: 21 July 1694 (aged 61) Skien, Norway
- Denomination: Christian
- Occupation: Priest

Jacob Jensen Jersin (1633–1694) was a Danish-Norwegian theologian and priest. He served as a bishop of the newly created Diocese of Christianssand from 1682 until his death in 1694.

== Personal life ==
Jacob Jensen Jersin was born in 1633 in Ribe, Denmark and he was baptized in church on 5 July of the same year. He was the son of Jens Dinesen Jersin (the Bishop of the Diocese of Ribe) and his third wife. Jersin married Adelheid Borchardsen on 5 October 1664. She was the daughter of Hans Borchardsen, the Bishop of the Diocese of Ribe.

== Education and career ==
He graduated from a school in the town of Sorø in 1652. In 1663, he received his magister's degree. In 1664, he was hired as a parish priest in Kalundborg. On 25 October 1680, he was unexpectedly called to become the Bishop of the Diocese of Stavanger, based in the city of Stavanger in Norway. Several months later, he began his new job. Then on 6 May 1682, about a year after beginning his job as bishop, the King of Denmark-Norway announced that the Bishop's seat was moving to the new town of Christianssand, and the diocese was to be renamed the Diocese of Christianssand. This was a somewhat controversial move, and the people of Stavanger protested and the Bishop and diocesan officials refused to move for two years. By 1684, however, the bishop finally relented and they moved the episcopal seat to the new Christianssand Cathedral. He died on 21 July 1694 while visiting the parish of Skien.

Church of Norway titles
Preceded by Christen Madsen Tausan	Bishop of Stavanger; 1681–1682	Diocese discontinued Replaced by the newly created Diocese of Christianssand
New diocese Replaced the old Diocese of Stavanger	Bishop of Christianssand; 1682–1694	Succeeded by Hans Munch
