= Sandved, Norway =

Borough in Sandnes, Norway

Bydel Sandved
- Borough
- Coat of arms

- Location within Sandnes Municipality
- Interactive map of Bydel Sandved
- Coordinates: 58°50′20″N 05°43′11″E
- Country: Norway
- Region: Western Norway
- County: Rogaland
- District: Jæren
- City: Sandnes

Area
  - Total: 2.5 km^{2} (0.97 sq mi)

Population (2016)
  - Total: 6,034
  - Density: 2,400/km^{2} (6,300/sq mi)
- Time zone: UTC+01:00 (CET)
  - Summer (DST): UTC+02:00 (CEST)
- Post Code: 4318 Sandnes

Sandved is a borough of the city of Sandnes in the western part of the large Sandnes Municipality in Rogaland county, Norway. The 2.5-square-kilometre (0.97 sq mi) borough has a population (2016) of 6,034. The borough is located just south of the downtown part of the city.

The local sports club is Sandved IL, with sections for association football and volleyball, and the indoor athletics and sports arenaSandneshallen is located here. The local church is Gand Church.
