= Sandneshallen =

Indoor multi-use arena in Sandved, Norway

Coordinates: 58°50′33″N 5°42′51″E

Sandneshallen is an indoor multi-use arena in Sandved, in Sandnes Municipality, Norway. It consists of an athletics track with four oval lanes and other relevant facilities, with a sports field for handball, basketball and floorball in the middle. The building was a cooperation among the Norwegian state, Rogaland County Municipality, Sandnes Municipality, Stavanger Municipality, and Randaberg Municipality. It opened on 1 June 2011, and was the second indoor athletics venue in Norway, after Ranheimhallen.
