= Sigurd Lunde (bishop) =

Norwegian theologian, teacher, author, broadcaster and Bishop

Rt. Rev. Sigurd Lunde
- Bishop
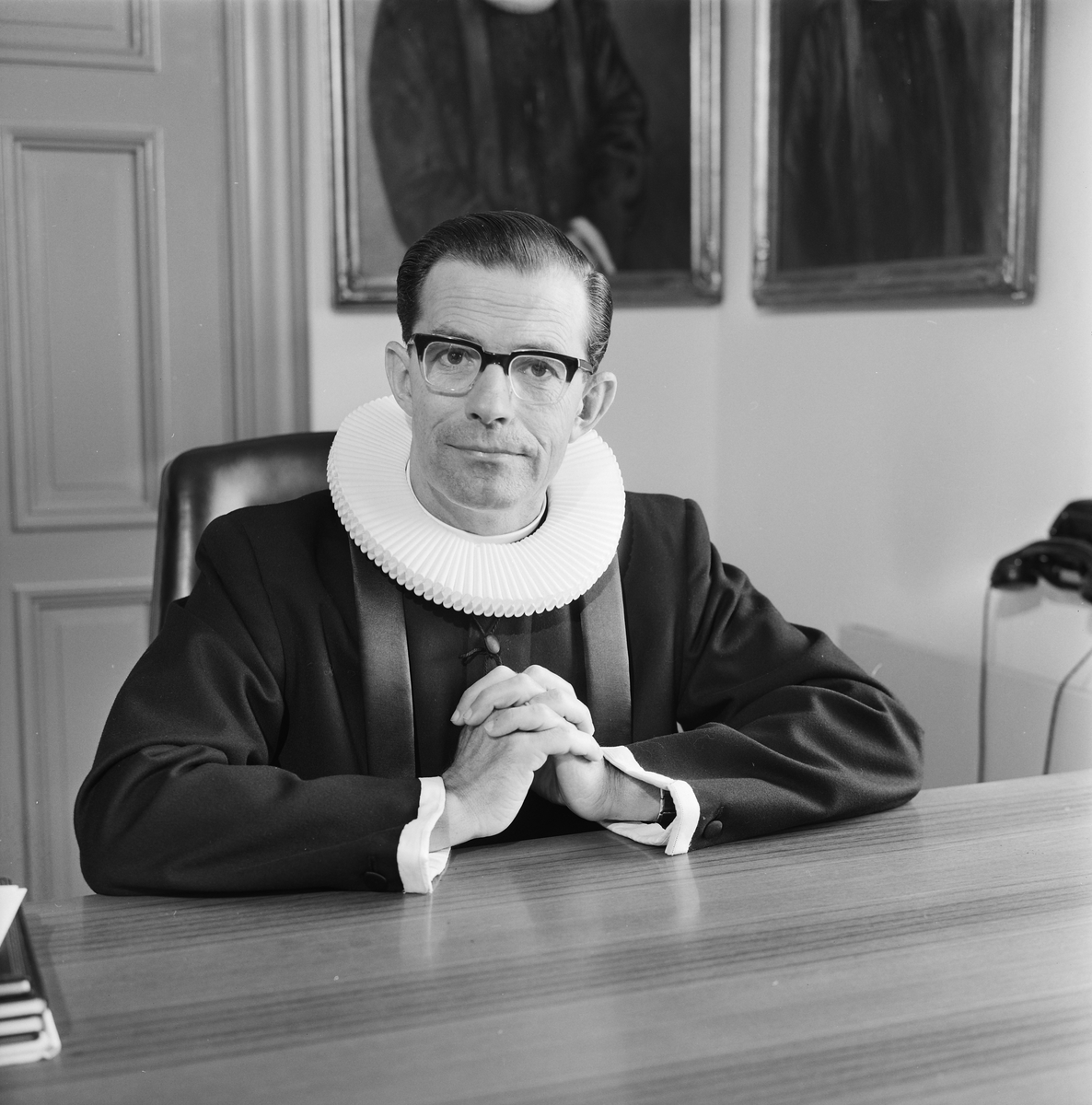
- Sigurd Lunde in 1967
- Church: Church of Norway
- Diocese: Diocese of Stavanger
- Appointed: 1977
- In office: 1977–1986
- Predecessor: Olav Hagesæther
- Successor: Bjørn Bue

Orders
- Consecration: 1977

Personal details
- Born: 27 April 1916
- Died: 21 January 2006 (aged 89)
- Denomination: Christian
- Occupation: Priest

Sigurd Lunde (27 April 1916–21 January 2006) was a Norwegian theologian, teacher, author, broadcaster, and Bishop of the Diocese of Stavanger. Lunde also wrote music and lyrics to hymns and psalms. He was the father of news anchor Einar Lunde.

== Biography ==
Sigurd Lunde was born on 27 April 1916. After going to school and being ordained as a priest in the Church of Norway, he also studied journalism in the United States. In 1942, he was hired by the Norwegian Missionary Society. He edited Norsk misjonstidende journal starting in 1946. From 1952 until 1966, Lunde worked for the Norwegian Broadcasting Corporation (NRK) as part of their religious broadcasts. He started the radio program Salmer og sanger vi er glad (Hymns and songs that we love). During his time with the NRK, he was also a teacher in the University of Oslo's practical-theological seminary from 1957 to 1967.

In 1966 he left the radio business and he was appointed as a curate at Ullern Church. He was promoted to vicar in the same parish in 1971. He was the bishop of the Diocese of Stavanger from 1977 to his retirement in 1986. He died on 21 January 2006 after a long illness.

== Publications ==
=== Hymns ===
- Jeg er frelst! Å, for en nåde
- Dine løfter er mange
- Jeg er i herrens hender
- Var du der når de korsfestet min Herre?
- Ikke en spurv til jorden
- Se, markene er hvite

=== Books ===
- Madagaskar tur-retur (1964)
- To tusen afrikanske kilometer (1964)
- Kristus er til stede (1978)
- I dag, i dag hjelper Herren (1992)
- Legemisjonæren personlig (1992)

Religious titles
Preceded by Olav Hagesæther	Bishop of Stavanger; 1976–1986	Succeeded by Bjørn Bue
