= Åna-Sira =

Village in Sokndal Municipality, Norway

- Village
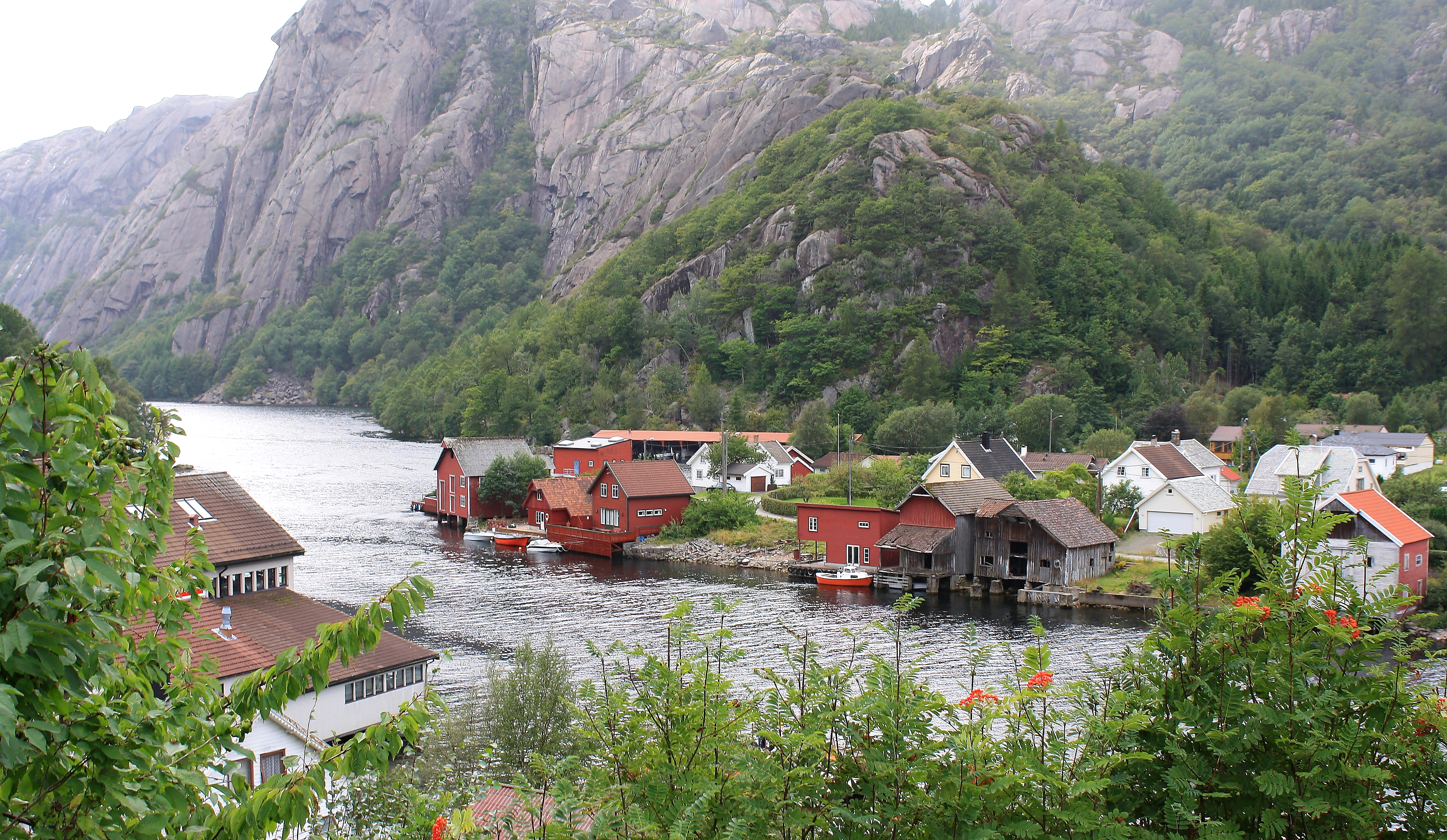
- View of the village
- Interactive map of Åna-Sira
- Coordinates: 58.29249°N 6.44026°E
- Country: Norway
- Region: Southern Norway
- County: Rogaland (and Agder)
- District: Dalane
- Municipality: Sokndal Municipality (and Flekkefjord Municipality)
- Elevation: 4 m (13 ft)
- Time zone: UTC+01:00 (CET)
  - Summer (DST): UTC+02:00 (CEST)
- Post Code: 4380 Hauge i Dalane

Åna-Sira is a village in southwestern Norway, sitting mostly in Sokndal Municipality in Rogaland county, but a small portion lies across the river in Flekkefjord Municipality in Agder county. The village is located at the mouth of the river Sira where it flows south into the Åna fjord (hence the name of the village). The fjord and river form the border between Rogaland and Agder counties. The Åna-Sira Bridge crosses the river connecting the two parts of the village. The village is the southernmost village in Rogaland county.

About 200 people live in Åna-Sira (in 2017), about three-fourths of the residents live on the north side of the river in Sokndal Municipality, and the rest live on the south side of the river. Åna-Sira Church is located on the Sokndal side of the village. There is a shrimp factory in the village as well as the Åna-Sira Power Station.

== Media gallery ==
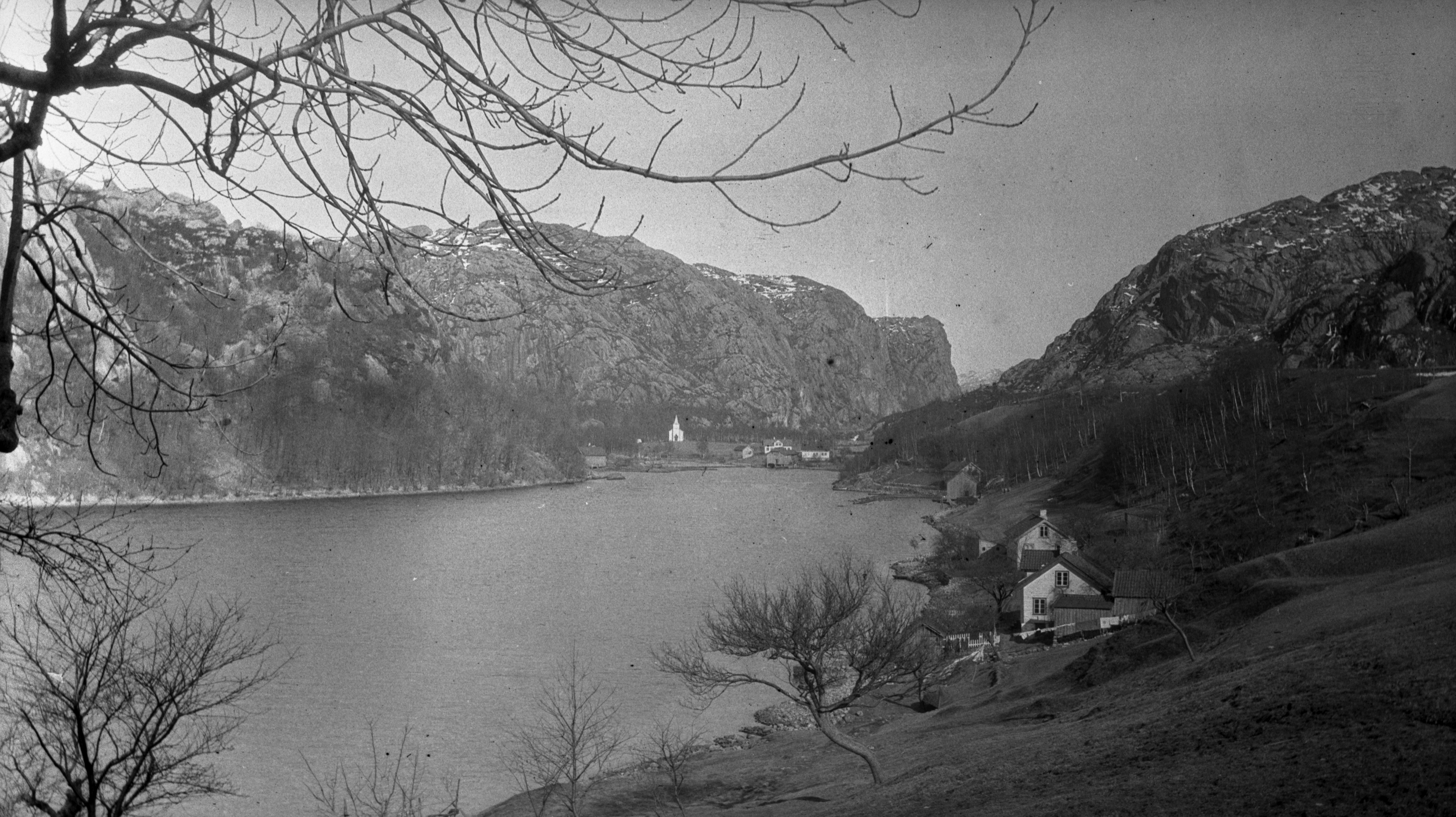
View of Åna-Sira in 1916 with the church in view

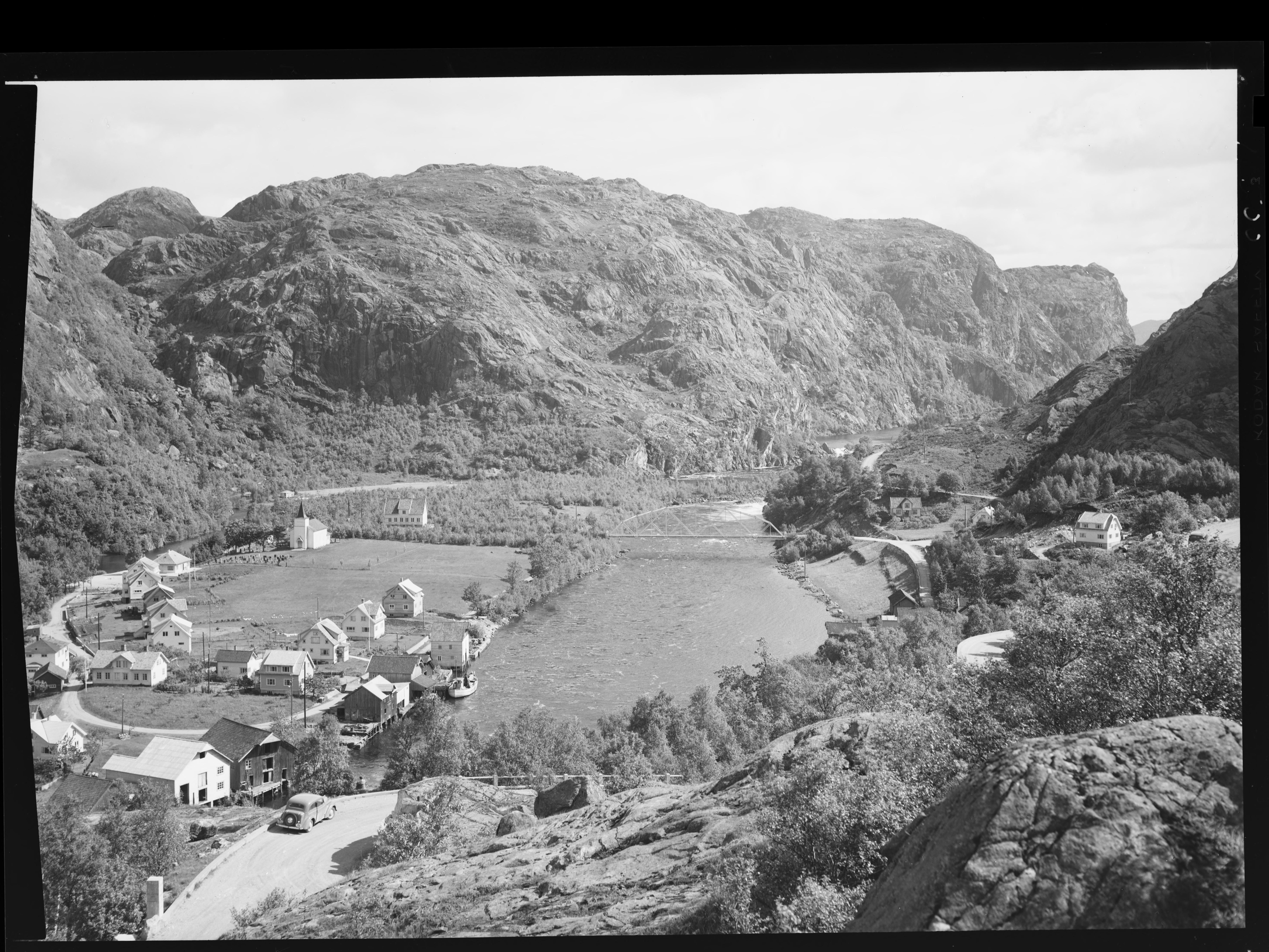
View of Åna-Sira in 1952

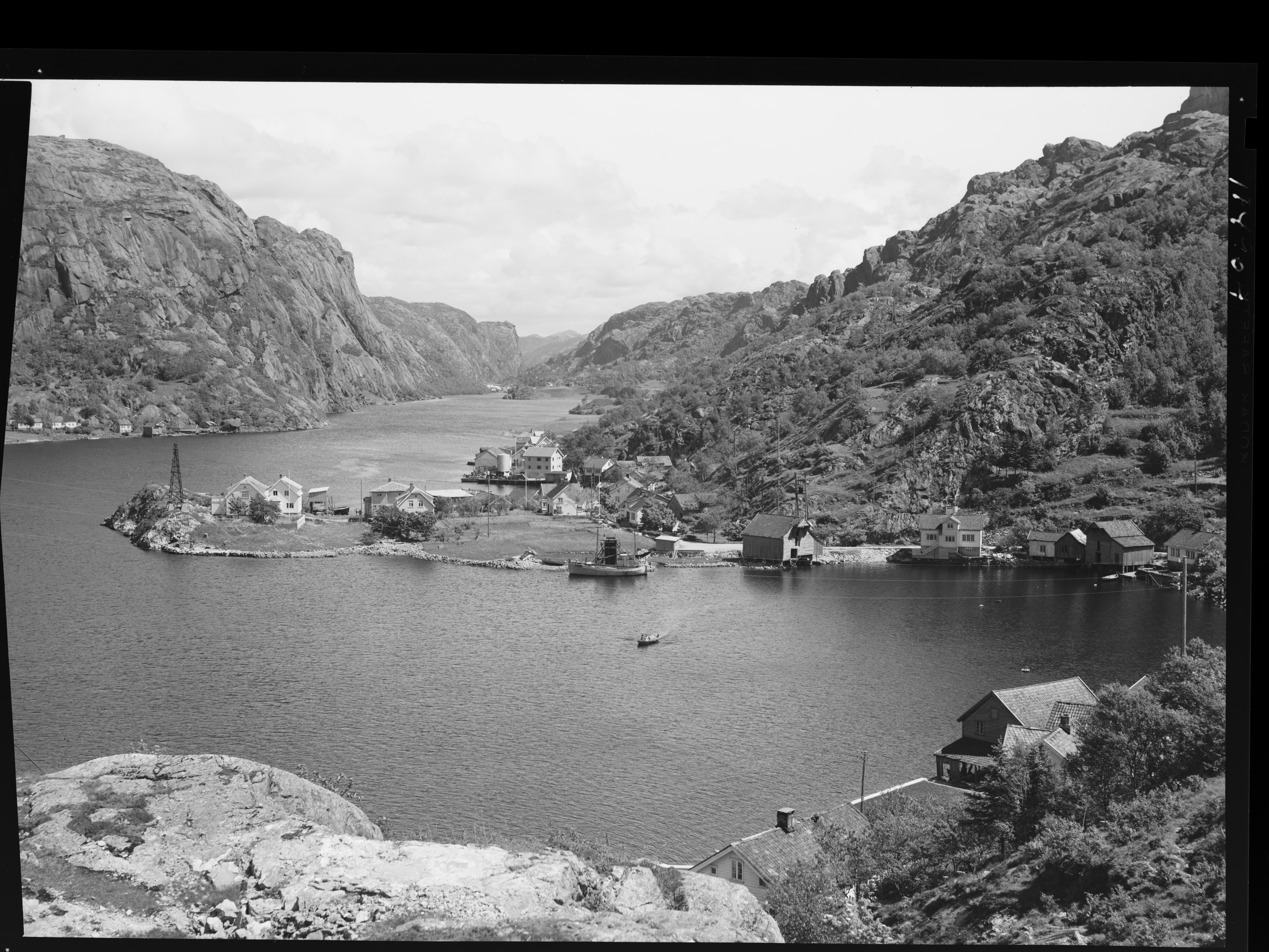
Another view from 1952
