= Hans Paludan Smith Schreuder =

Norwegian missionary (1817–1882)

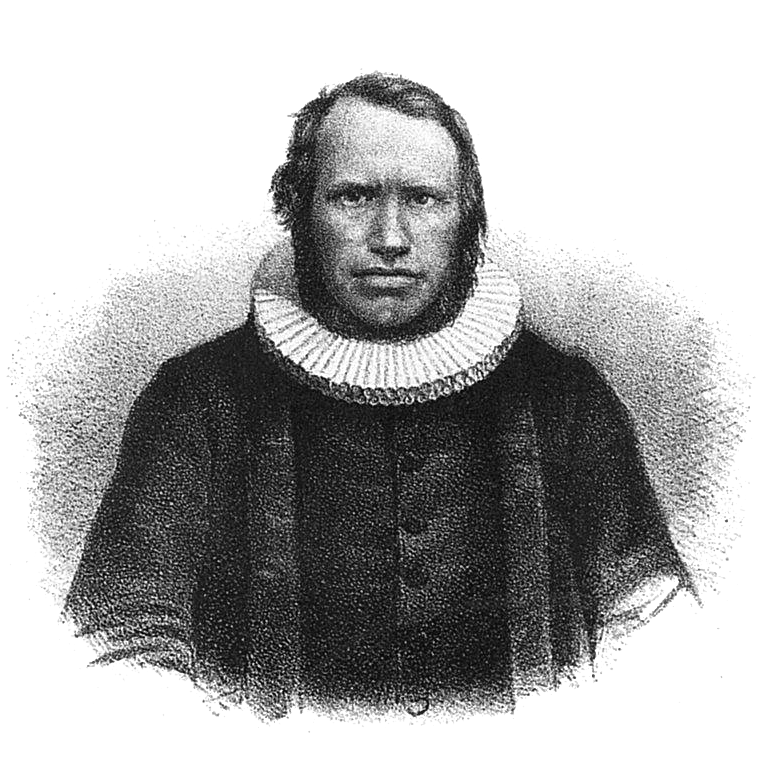
Hans Paludan Smith Schreuder (1865)

Hans Paludan Smith Schreuder (18 June 1817 - 27 June 1882) was a Norwegian missionary who developed close relationships with the Zulu and British authorities.

== Early life ==
Hans Paludan Smith Schreuder was born in Sogndal in Nordre Bergenhus, Norway in 1817. As a theological student, he was very interested in missionary work, and wrote a treatise entitled A Few Words to the Church of Norway on Christian Obligation to be Concerned about the Salvation of Non-Christian Fellow Men. Unlike other missionaries who describe their missionary work as a "calling", Schreuder saw it more as a "duty".

== Early missionary work ==
In 1842 the Norwegian Missionary Society was created. Schreuder became its first missionary, arriving in Port Natal (now Durban, South Africa) on New Year's Day 1844. He then made his way north of the Tugela River on the advice of a fellow missionary, Robert Moffat. Schreuder became the first permanent missionary in Zululand, the kingdom of the Zulus. Starting in the early 1850s, Schreuder managed to start twelve missionary stations. The first baptism took place in 1858. He converted almost 300 people and was made Bishop of the Mission Field of the Church of Norway in 1866.

In his many years in Kwa Zulu, Schreuder became very fluent in their language. He is responsible for authoring the first complete grammar of the Zulu language. His scholarship ranged beyond linguistics and theology; he became a student of the Zulu culture and history, as well as an expert in the wealth of plant and animal life in the area.

== Mediation ==
Because of Schreuder's friendship with the Zulu King Mpande, and also because of the trust placed in him by the British, Schreuder was able on several occasions to remove misunderstandings and prevent clashes between the two nations. Under Cetshwayo, Mpande's son and successor, relations became more strained. Cetshwayo wanted the missionaries to leave his country. On the other hand, he also desired British recognition of himself as the rightful leader of his people. Cetshwayo therefore sought the advice of Schreuder, who agreed to approach the government of Natal in the matter. As a result of Schreuder's aid, in 1873 Cetshwayo was formally installed as king of the Zulus. An important part of the ceremony was the full assent given by the king to the introduction of new laws, the first of which was that the indiscriminate shedding of blood should cease.

== Anglo-Zulu War ==
In the years following Cetshwayo's installation, Schreuder acted as an intermediary between the Zulu king and the British authorities in Natal. In the war that eventually broke out he offered his services, in the interest of peace, to Zulus and British alike. He declined an offer from Sir Garnet Wolseley, commander-in-chief of the British forces during the Anglo-Zulu War, to spy for the British.

== Personal life ==
Schreuder twice married and had no children. He died in 1882, in the Colony of Natal, South Africa.

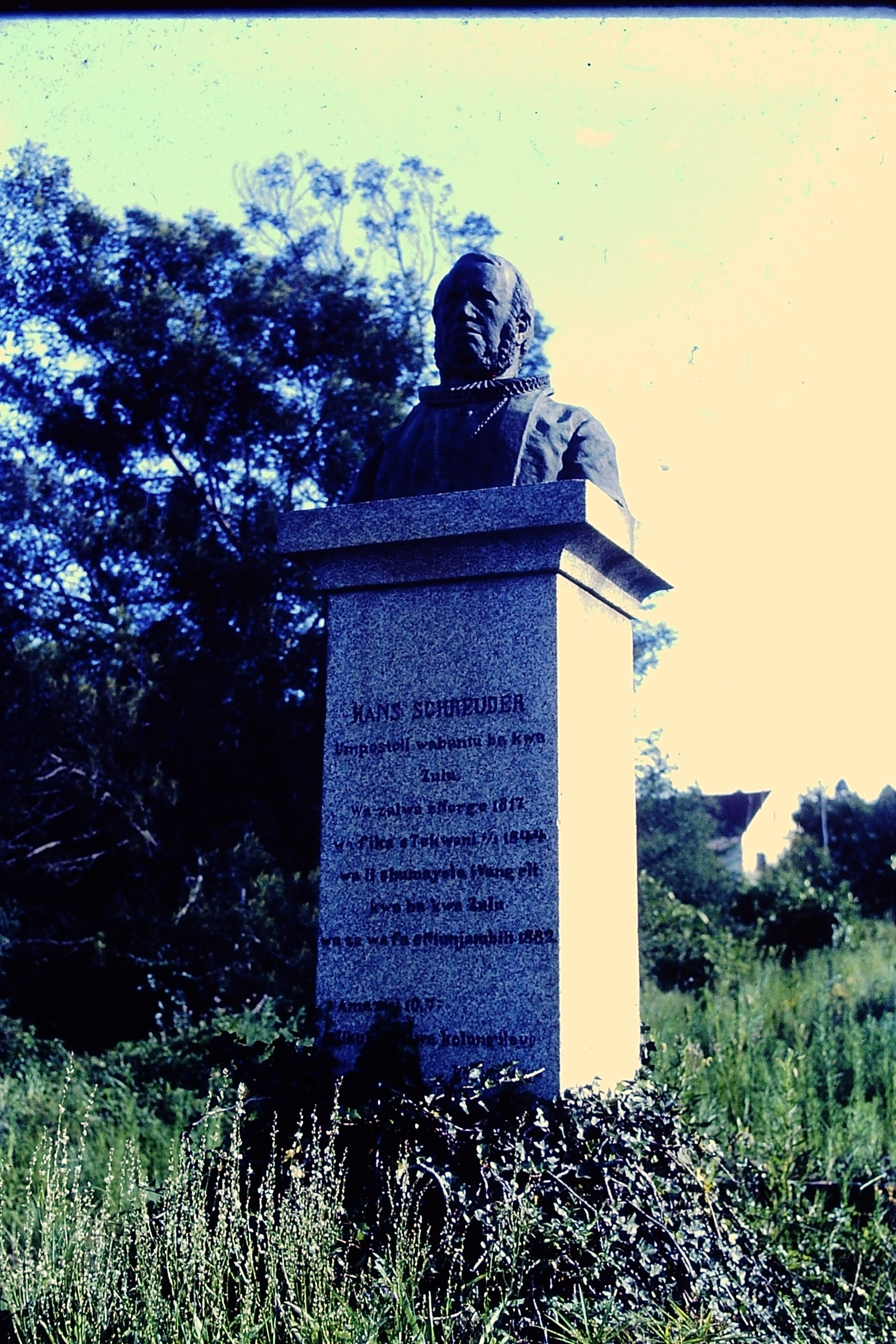
Gravesite of Bishop Hans Paludan Smith Schreuder in Ntunjambili, Zululand, South Africa.

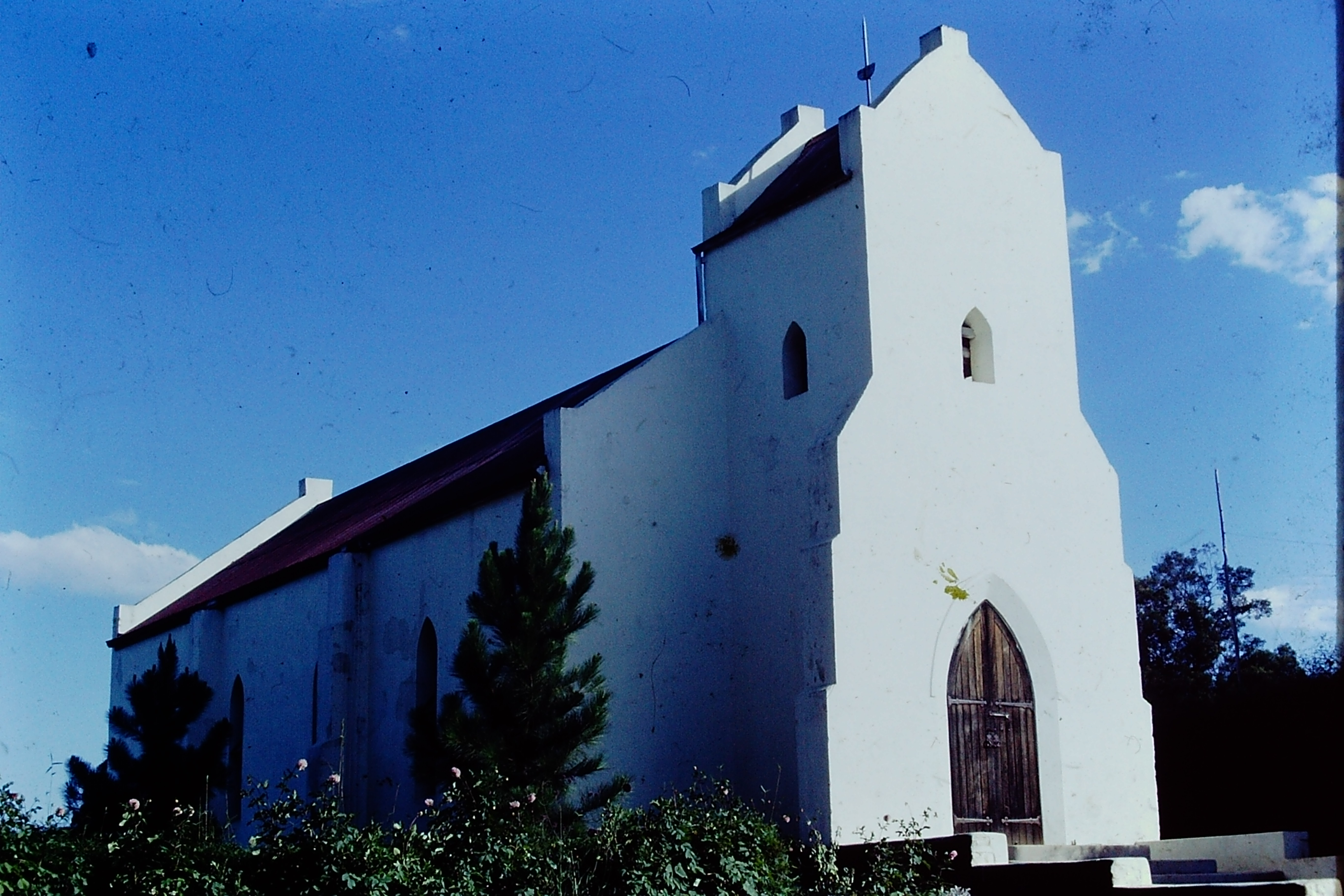
The Lutheran mission church at Ntjunjambili, Zululand, South Africa was built by Bishop Schreuder. Bishop Schreuder's grave is next to this church.

== Works on Languages ==
Hans P. Schreuder; Christopher Andreas Holmboe: Grammatik for Zulu-Sproget. Forfattet af H. P. S. Schreuder, ordineret Præst og norsk Missionær i Sydafrika. Med Fortale og Anmærkninger af C. A. Holmboe, Professor i de österlandske Sprog ved Norges Universitet. Christiania (Sweden): Trykt hos W. C. Fabritius, 1850, VIII+88 pp.

== See also ==
- Zulu Kingdom

== Other sources ==
- Anderson, Gerald H., Robert T. Coote, James M. Phillips (1994) Mission Legacies: Biographical Studies of Leaders of the Modern Missionary Movement (Orbis Books) ISBN 978-0883449646
- Rakkenes, Øystein (2003) Himmelfolket: En Norsk Høvding i Zululand (Oslo: Cappelen) ISBN 9788202204921
- Tjelle, Kristin Fjelde (2014) Missionary Masculinity, 1870-1930: The Norwegian Missionaries in South-East Africa (Palgrave Macmillan) ISBN 9781137336354

== Related reading ==
- Morris, Donald (1998) The Washing of the Spears: A History of the Rise of the Zulu Nation Under Shaka and Its Fall in the Zulu War of 1879 (Boston, Da Capo Press) ISBN 978-0306808661
