= Erling Pettersen =

Norwegian priest and bishop

Right Reverend Erling Johan Pettersen
- Bishop Emeritus of Stavanger
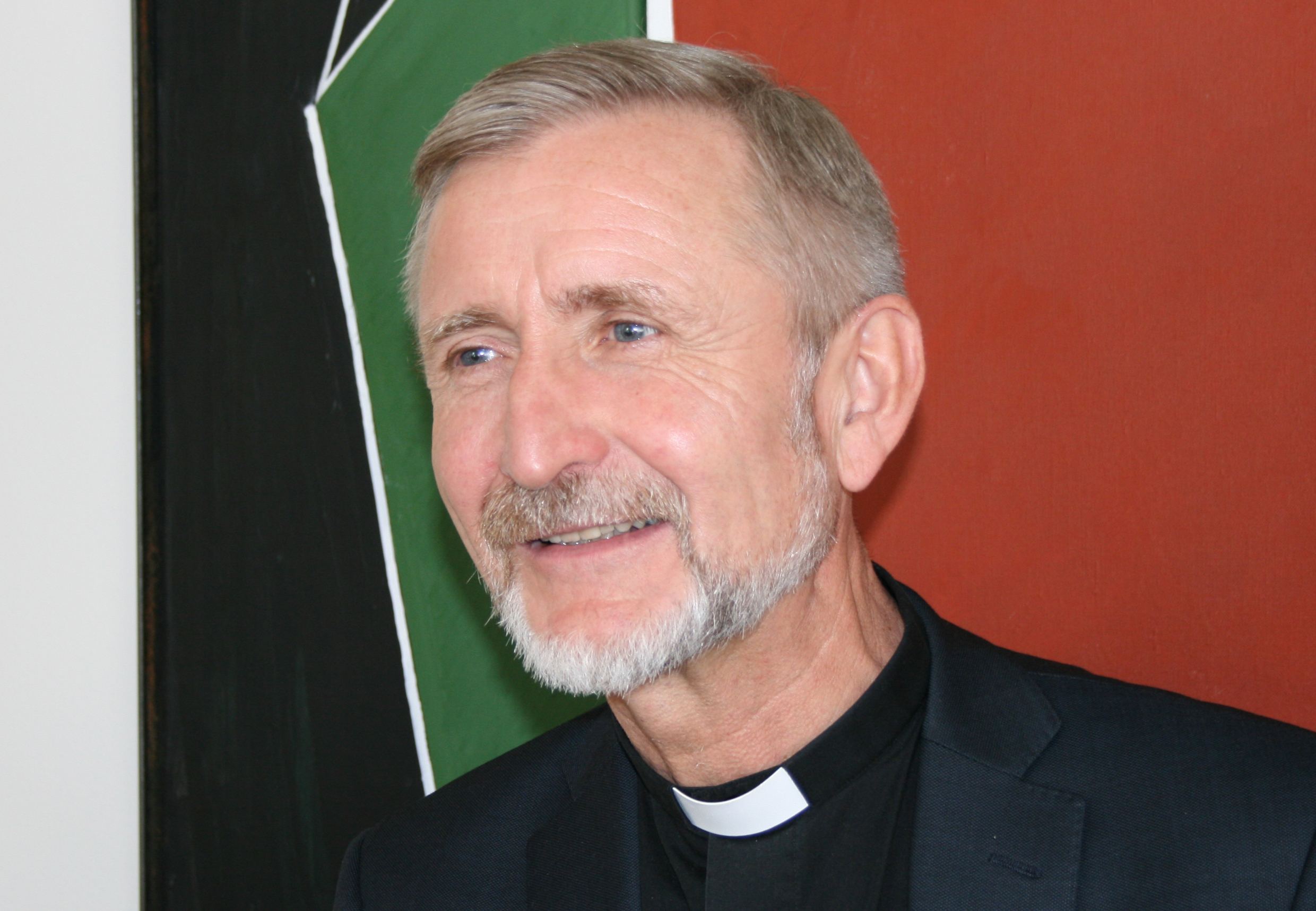
- Photo by Vidar Kristiansen
- Church: Church of Norway
- Diocese: Diocese of Stavanger
- Appointed: 19 June 2009
- In office: 2009–2016
- Predecessor: Ernst Oddvar Baasland
- Successor: Ivar Braut

Orders
- Ordination: 1 July 1979
- Consecration: 8 November 2009

Personal details
- Born: 21 February 1950 (age 76) Bergen, Norway
- Denomination: Christian
- Spouse: Turid Barth Pettersen
- Occupation: Priest
- Education: Cand.theol.

Erling Johan Pettersen (born 1950) is a Norwegian theologian, priest, and since 2016, a Bishop Emeritus of the Church of Norway. Pettersen served as the Bishop of the Diocese of Stavanger in Stavanger, Norway from 2009 until his retirement in 2016.

== Biography ==
Erling Pettersen was born on 21 February 1950 in the city of Bergen in Hordaland county, Norway. He is a 1977 graduate of the MF Norwegian School of Theology in Oslo, Norway. He was ordained as a priest on 1 July 1979.

Pettersen was a teacher at the MF Norwegian School of Theology from 1975 to 1976 and again from 1981 to 1984, he was a theological consultant at the Diakonhjemmets school for social workers from 1977 to 1979 and a consultant for the Church of Norway from 1979 to 1985. From 1985 until 1989, he was a missionary priest in Joinville, Brazil. After returning to Norway in 1989, he was the department head of the Institutt for Kristen Oppseding (IKO), a position he held until 1996. He was then the director of the Church of Norway executive council from 1996 to 2006. Pettersen was the main parish priest of Nordstrand Church in Oslo from 2007-2009.

== Bishop ==
Pettersen was nominated to be Bishop of the Diocese of Tunsberg in 2002 and Bishop of the Diocese of Oslo in 2004, but he ultimately was not chosen. In 2009, after the resignation of Bishop Ernst Baasland in the Diocese of Stavanger, Pettersen was again nominated to be Bishop there. He was voted in second place after Kjetil Aano, but the government chose Pettersen instead. On 19 June 2009, Pettersen was appointed Bishop of the Diocese of Stavanger, and he was consecrated as Bishop on 8 November 2009. There was some public questioning as to why the labour party government chose the second-place finisher for the office of Bishop of Stavanger. The Norwegian Minister of Culture and Church Affairs, Trond Giske, said that Pettersen's support for the ordination of homosexual priests living in same-sex relationships was not the deciding factor even though Pettersen was the only person nominated for Bishop that supported this.

After becoming Bishop, 19 priests within the diocese wanted a change because Pettersen was too liberal and not in-line with Biblical teaching. These priests requested an alternate solution so that they did not report to a Bishop that they believed was theologically incorrect. After a lot of discussion, the two sides agreed that the church and bishop's conference were split on the topic and that they would continue to try to find a local solution.

Erling Pettersen retired at the end of 2016 and he was replaced by Ivar Braut.

== Personal life ==
Pettersen has been married to his wife, Turid Barth Pettersen, since 1971. They have 2 daughters and 2 granddaughters.

Religious titles
Preceded by Ernst Baasland	Bishop of Stavanger; 2009–2016	Succeeded by Ivar Braut
