= Olav Hagesæther =

Norwegian theologian, priest and Bishop

Rt. Rev. Olav Hagesæther
- Bishop
- Church: Church of Norway
- Diocese: Diocese of Stavanger
- Appointed: 1968
- In office: 1968–1976
- Predecessor: Fridtjov Søiland Birkeli
- Successor: Sigurd Lunde

Orders
- Consecration: 1968

Personal details
- Born: 25 August 1909 Bergen, Norway
- Died: 7 March 1999 (aged 89) Stavanger, Norway
- Denomination: Christian
- Parents: Andreas Hagesæther and Karen Sandvik
- Spouse: Johanna Sophie Danbolt
- Children: Ole Hagesæther
- Occupation: Priest
- Education: MF Norwegian School of Theology, Cand.theol. (1932)

Olav Hagesæther (1909–1999) was a Norwegian theologian, priest, and Bishop of the Diocese of Stavanger. His son, Ole Hagesæther, was also a Norwegian bishop in the Diocese of Bjørgvin.

== Biography ==
Olav Hagesæther was born on 25 August 1909 in Bergen, Norway to Andreas and Karen Hagesæther. He went to the MF Norwegian School of Theology from 1928 until his graduation in 1932. He received a cand.theol. degree. He was hired as a teacher at the Nordhordland Bible school run by Det norske lutherske Indremisjonsselskap missionary organization during the 1930s. In 1939, he was hired as the assistant pastor for Haus Church in Haus Municipality. From 1945 to 1958, he was the parish priest for Rjukan Church. In 1958, he was hired as an assistant pastor at the Johannes Church in Bergen. In 1964, he was promoted to parish priest for the same church. In 1968, he was appointed to the post of Bishop of the Diocese of Stavanger, based at the Stavanger Cathedral. He held this job until his retirement in 1976. He died on 7 March 1999 in Stavanger after a long illness.

Religious titles
Preceded by Fridtjov Søiland Birkeli	Bishop of Stavanger; 1968–1976	Succeeded by Sigurd Lunde
