= Anne Lise Ådnøy =

20th and 21st-century Norwegian bishop

The Right Reverend Anne Lise Ådnøy
- Bishop of Stavanger
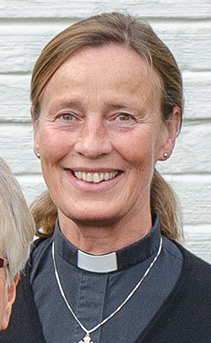
- Anne Lise Ådnøy in October 2018
- Church: Church of Norway
- Diocese: Stavanger
- Elected: 25 January 2019
- In office: 2019–present
- Predecessor: Ivar Braut
- Successor: Tor Magne Nesvik

Orders
- Ordination: 30 August 1984 by Halvor Bergan
- Consecration: 17 March 2019 by Helga Haugland Byfuglien

Personal details
- Denomination: Lutheran

Anne Lise Ådnøy is a Norwegian prelate who is the current Bishop of Stavanger.

== Biography ==
Ådnøy was ordained as a priest on 30 August 1984 for the Diocese of Agder og Telemark. She served as vicar in Kirkelandet and Frei between 1984 and 1985. Later she served as parish priest of Edøy Church, and in 1993 became a youth priest at the Church in Hundvåg, Stavanger. Between 2003 and 2011 she served as parish priest of St. Petri Church in Stavanger. She became provost of Stavanger Cathedral in 2011 and remained there until her consecration as bishop on 17 March 2019.

Religious titles
Preceded by Ivar Braut	Bishop of Stavanger; 2019–current	Incumbent
