= Fossum Church =

- Fossum kirke
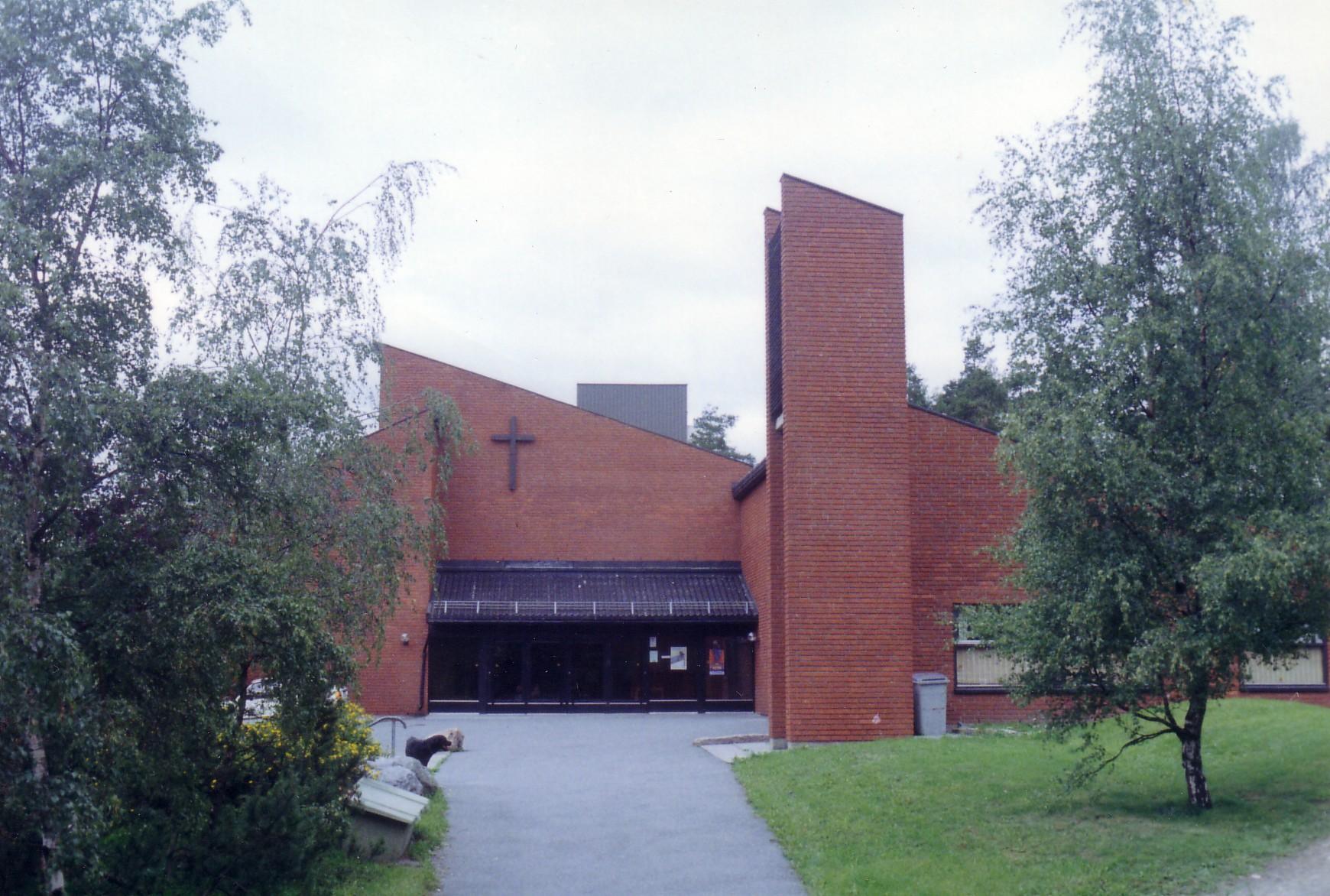
- Fossum Church
- 59°57′45.515″N 10°55′28.657″E
- Location: Stovner senter 12; Stovner; Oslo,
- Country: Norway
- Denomination: Church of Norway
- Churchmanship: Evangelical Lutheran
- Website: https://kirken.no

History
- Status: Parish church
- Consecrated: 1976

Architecture
- Functional status: Active

Specifications
- Capacity: 600
- Materials: Brick

Administration
- Diocese: Diocese of Oslo
- Deanery: Østre Aker
- Parish: Høybråten, Fossum og Stovner

Fossum Church is a church center at Stovner in Oslo, Norway. The church was designed by the architectural firm Anker & Hølaas and created by Selvaagbygg. The church was consecrated in September 1976. Fossum church has 200 seats in the nave and 400 in the aisles.

The altar decoration was created by Zdenka Rusova in 1976, a brass cross on a painted surface with flame pattern. On the side walls are twelve images with motifs from life of Jesus, created by Ewa Calber Westelius in 1996.

The church organ with 19 voices from 1991, from Ryde & Berg is said to be among Oslo's best.

The church bells are placed in the separate bell tower next to the church. There are 12 bells in the carillon. The bells were cast at Olsen Nauen Bell Foundry in 1976.

Fossum Church is listed by the Norwegian Directorate for Cultural Heritage.
