= Gand Church =

Church in Rogaland, Norway

- Gand kirke
- Jæren Cathedral (Jærkatedralen)
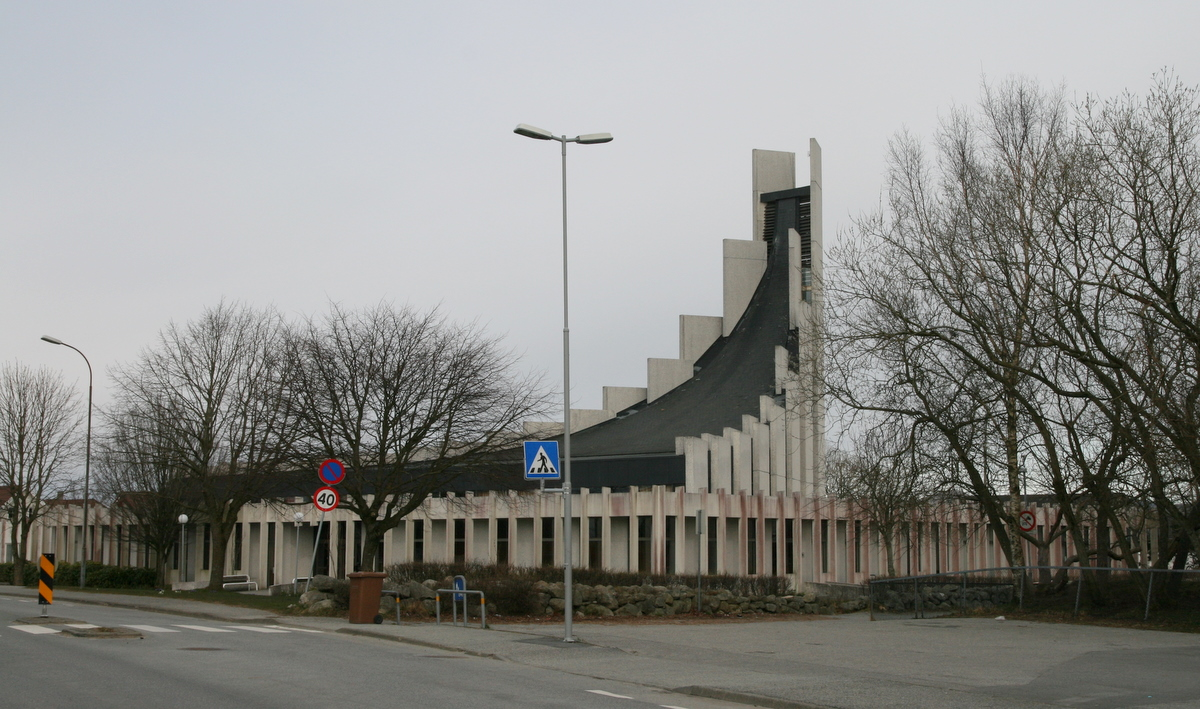
- View of the church
- Gand Church
- 58.8401°N 5.7142°E
- Location: Sandnes, Rogaland
- Country: Norway
- Denomination: Church of Norway
- Churchmanship: Evangelical Lutheran

History
- Status: Parish church
- Founded: 1978
- Consecrated: 3 Dec 1978

Architecture
- Functional status: Active
- Architect(s): Tonning and Øglænd
- Architectural type: Rectangular
- Completed: 1978

Specifications
- Capacity: 650
- Materials: Concrete

Administration
- Diocese: Stavanger bispedømme
- Deanery: Sandnes prosti
- Parish: Gand

Gand Church (Norwegian: Gand kirke) is a parish church of the Church of Norway in the large Sandnes Municipality in Rogaland county, Norway. It is located in the borough of Sandved in the city of Sandnes in the far western part of the municipality. It is one of the two churches for the Gand parish which is part of the Sandnes prosti (deanery) in the Diocese of Stavanger. The large concrete church was built in a rectangular design in 1978 using designs by the architects Tonning and Øglænd. The church seats about 650 people.

Due to its size, it is sometimes referred to as the Jæren Cathedral (Norwegian: Jærkatedralen). The church was consecrated on 3 December 1978. The church cost about 13.2 million kr, and it includes a large sanctuary, a chapel, office wing, Sunday school rooms, and two fellowship halls.

== See also ==
- List of churches in Rogaland
