= Norwegian Missionary Society =

Christian organization

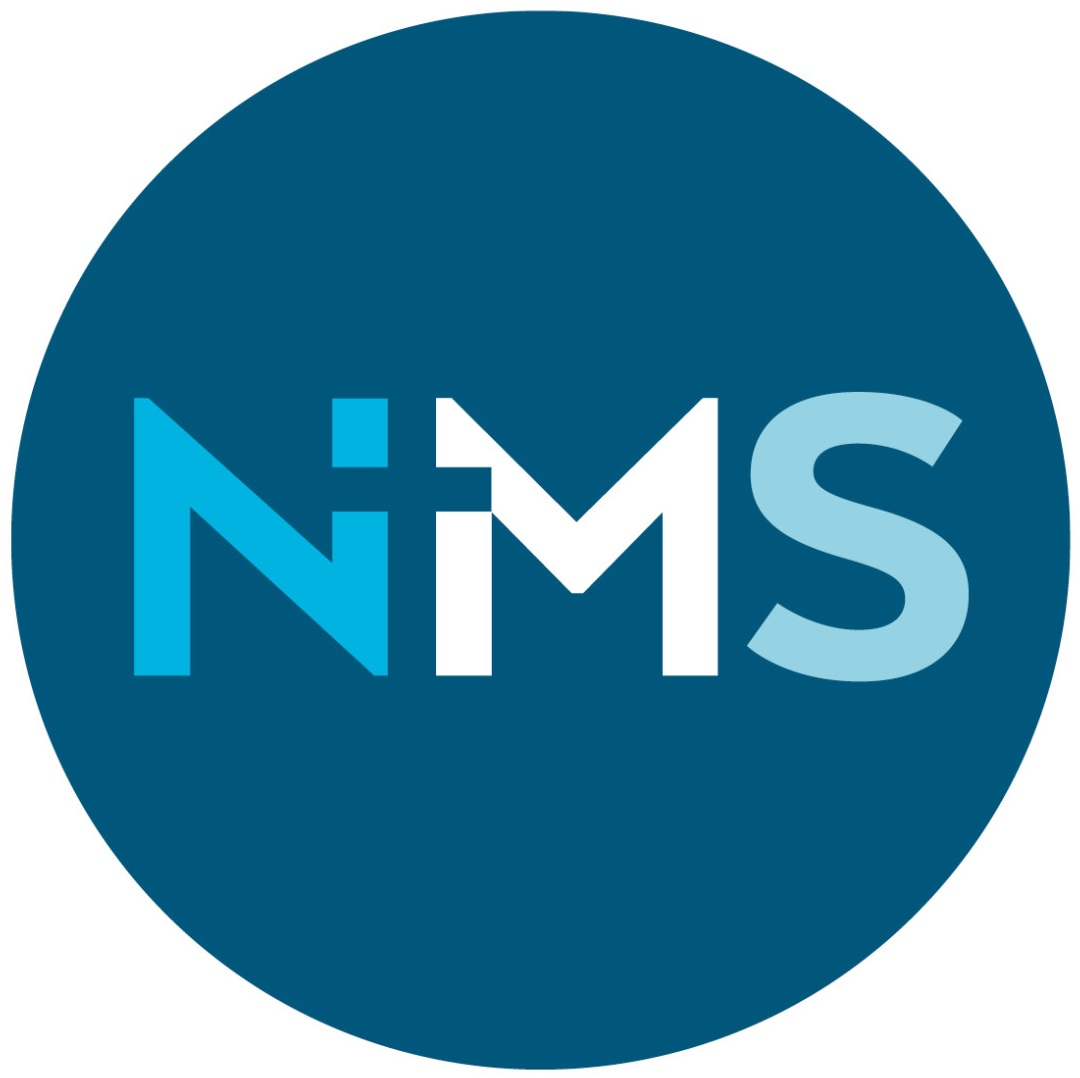

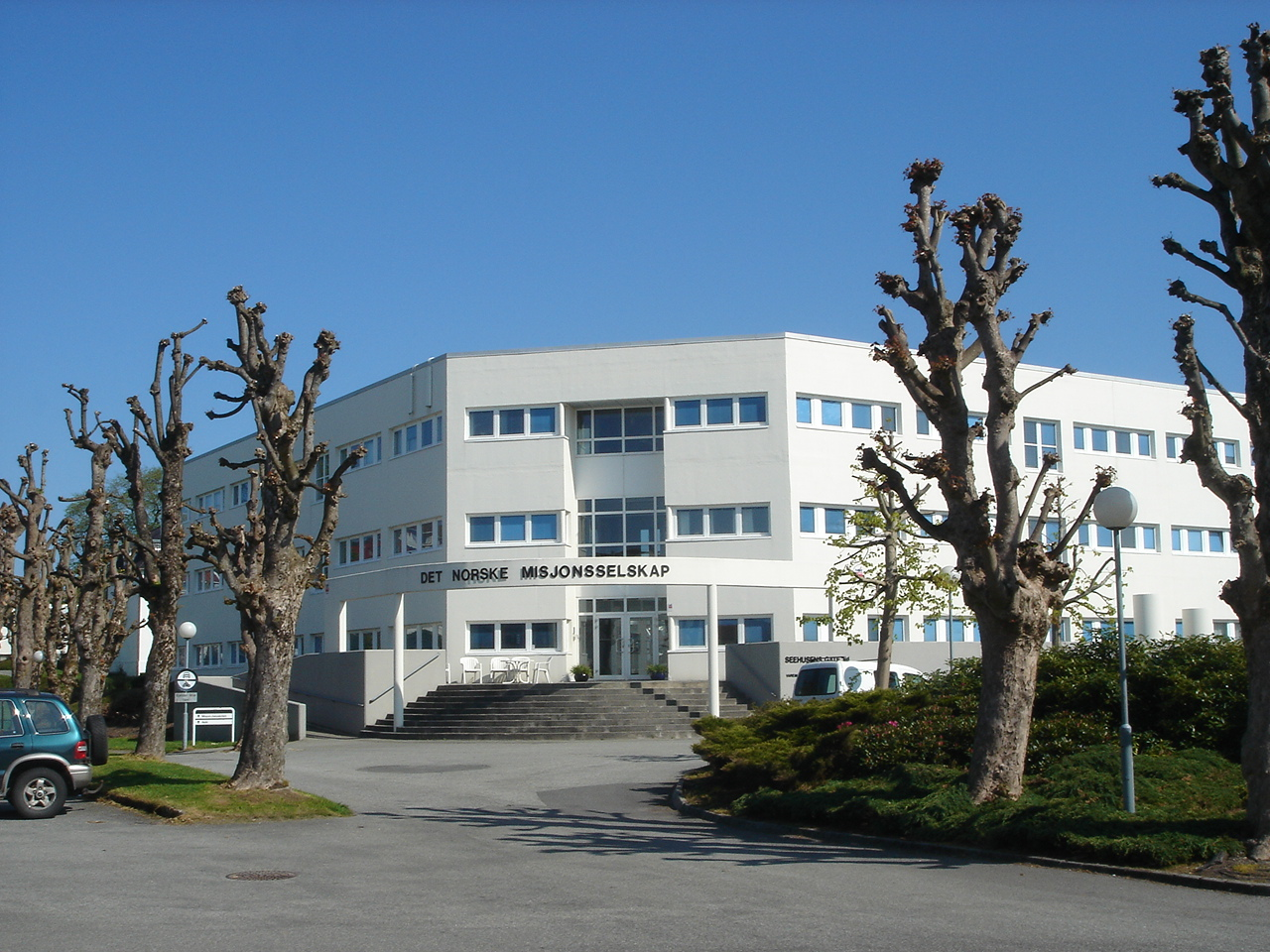
- Headquarters in Stavanger, Norway
- Formation: August 1842; 184 years ago
- Purpose: Religious
- Services: Proselytizing
- Website: www.nms.no

The Norwegian Missionary Society or the Norwegian Mission Society (Norwegian: Det Norske Misjonsselskap, NMS) is the first and oldest missionary organization in Norway.

It was started by a group of approximately 180 Stavanger residents in August 1842, to spread Christianity to other people, mainly in Africa. Hans Paludan Smith Schreuder was its first missionary, leaving for the Zulu Kingdom in 1843. It now works in Estonia, the United Kingdom, France, Cameroon, Mali, Ethiopia, South Africa, Madagascar, Brazil, Pakistan, China, Thailand and Japan.

The chairman of the board is Rev. Helge Gaard and Rev. Jeffrey Huseby is the general secretary since 2011.
