= Diocese of Stavanger =

Diocese of the Church of Norway

Diocese of Stavanger Stavanger bispedømme
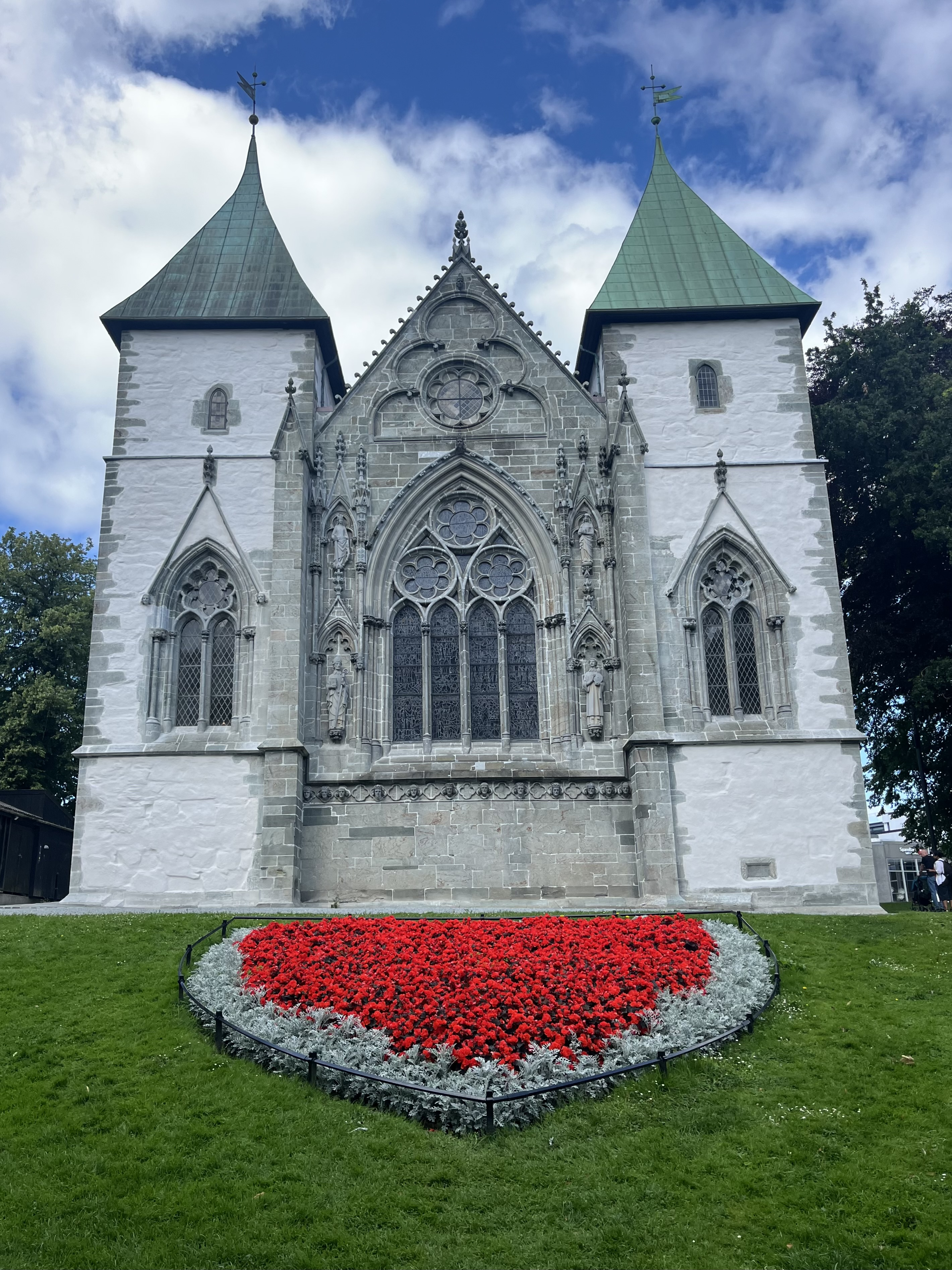
- View of the Stavanger Cathedral

Location
- Country: Norway
- Territory: Rogaland
- Deaneries: Stavanger domprosti, Dalane, Haugaland, Jæren, Karmøy, Ryfylke, Sandnes, Tungenes, Ytre Stavnager

Statistics
- Parishes: 91
- Members: 338,742

Information
- Denomination: Church of Norway
- Established: 1925
- Cathedral: Stavanger Cathedral

Current leadership
- Bishop: Tor Magne Nesvik

Map
- Location of the Diocese of Stavanger

Website
- http://www.bd.kirken.no/stavanger/

The Diocese of Stavanger (Norwegian: Stavanger bispedømme) is a diocese in the Church of Norway. It covers all of Rogaland county in western Norway. The cathedral city is Stavanger, where the Stavanger Cathedral is located. The bishop is Tor Magne Nesvik, who has held the post since 2026.

== History ==
The ancient Diocese of Stavanger was established in the 12th century (either 1112 or maybe 1125) when it was separated from the Ancient Diocese of Bergen. Initially, the large diocese covered the (modern) counties of Rogaland and Agder as well as the regions of Valdres (in Innlandet county), Hallingdal (in Buskerud county), and the parishes of Eidfjord and Røldal (in Vestland county). After the Protestant Reformation, the Diocese of Stavanger continued in the new Church of Norway.

Over time, the diocese was reduced in size. The parish of Eidfjord was transferred to the neighboring Diocese of Bjørgvin in 1630. The regions of Valdres and Hallingdal were transferred to the Diocese of Oslo in 1631, but in exchange, the Diocese of Oslo had to give the upper part of Telemark and transfer that to the Diocese of Stavanger.

In 1682 Christian V, King of Denmark-Norway issued an order that the Bishop and the Prefect of the Diocese of Stavanger were to be moved to the Christianssand Cathedral, which had been consecrated in 1646 and which the King intended to be the perfect site for a new cathedral. The citizens of Stavanger protested, with the Prefect and the Bishop refusing to move and ignoring the order. It took two years before Christianssand was established as the new cathedral city. The diocese was renamed Diocese of Christianssand (Norwegian: "Christiansands stift").

On 1 January 1925, the Diocese of Kristiansand was divided and all of the diocese located in Rogaland county was moved to the newly re-established Diocese of Stavanger and the cathedral in Stavanger regained its place as the seat of a bishop.

== Bishops of Stavanger ==
=== Catholic (12th century-Reformation) ===
- Reinald ca. 1112–1135
- Jon Birgersson, 1135–1152
- Peter, 1152–??
- Amund, ??–1171
- Eirik Ivarsson, 1171–1188
- Njål, 1189/90–1207
- Henrik, 1207–1224
- Askell Jonsson, 1226–1254
- Torgils, 1255–1276
- Arne, 1277–1303
- Ketil, 1304–1317
- Håkon Halldorsson, 1318–1322
- Eirik Ogmundsson, 1322–1342
- Guttorm Pålsson, 1343–1350
- Sigfrid, 1351–1352
- Gyrd Aslason, 1354–1355
- Bottolf Asbjørnsson, 1355–1380
- Hallgeirr Osmundsson, 1380/81
- Olaf, 1381/82–1398/1400
- Håkon Ivarsson, 1400–1426
- Audun Eyvindsson, 1427–1445
- Gunnar Eriksson, 1445–1451/53
- Sigurd Bjørnsson, 1454–1463
- Alv Thorgardsson, 1464–1478
- Eiliv Jonsson, 1481–1512
- Hoskuld Hoskuldsson, 1513–1537

=== Lutheran (Reformation–1682) ===
- Jon Guttormsen, 1541–1557
- Jens Gregersen Riber, 1558–1571
- Jørgen Eriksen, 1571–1604
- Laurits Clausen Scabo, 1605–1626
- Tomas Cortsen Wegner, 1627–1654
- Markus Christensen Humble, 1655–1661
- Christen Madsen Tausan, 1661–1680

In 1682 the diocese seat was moved from Stavanger to Christianssand

=== Lutheran (1925–present) ===
The large Diocese of Kristiansand was divided with all of Rogaland county becoming the newly re-established Diocese of Stavanger

- Jacob Christian Petersen, 1925–1940
- Gabriel Skagestad, 1940–1949
- Karl Martinussen, 1949–1960
- Fritjov Søiland Birkeli, 1960–1968
- Olav Hagesæther, 1968–1976
- Sigurd Lunde, 1977–1986
- Bjørn Bue, 1986–1997
- Ernst Oddvar Baasland, 1998–2009
- Erling Johan Pettersen, 2009–2016
- Ivar Braut, 2017–2019
- Anne Lise Ådnøy, 2019-2026
- Tor Magne Nesvik since 2026

== Structure ==
The Diocese of Stavanger is divided into nine deaneries (Norwegian: Prosti) spread out over Rogaland county. Each deanery corresponds a geographical area, usually one or more municipalities in the diocese. Each municipality is further divided into one or more parishes which each contain one or more congregations. See each municipality below for lists of churches and parishes within them.

Deanery (Prosti)	Municipalities
Stavanger domprosti	Stavanger
Dalane prosti	Bjerkreim, Eigersund, Lund, Sokndal
Haugaland prosti	Bokn, Haugesund, Tysvær, Utsira, Vindafjord
Jæren prosti	Gjesdal, Hå, Klepp, Time
Karmøy prosti	Karmøy
Ryfylke prosti	Sauda, Suldal, Hjelmeland, Strand
Sandnes prosti	Sandnes
Tungenes prosti	Kvitsøy, Randaberg, Sola, Stavanger
Ytre Stavanger prosti	Stavanger
