= Monarchy of Antigua and Barbuda =

King of Antigua and Barbuda
- Coat of arms of Antigua and Barbuda

Incumbent
- Charles III since 8 September 2022

Details
- Style: His Majesty
- Heir apparent: William, Prince of Wales
- First monarch: Elizabeth II
- Formed: 1 November 1981

The monarchy of Antigua and Barbuda is a system of government in which a hereditary monarch is the sovereign and head of state of Antigua and Barbuda. The current Antiguan and Barbudan monarch and head of state, since 8 September 2022, is King Charles III. As sovereign, he is the personal embodiment of the Crown of Antigua and Barbuda. Although the person of the sovereign is equally shared with 14 other independent countries within the Commonwealth of Nations, each country's monarchy is separate and legally distinct. As a result, the current monarch is officially titled King of Antigua and Barbuda and, in this capacity, he and other members of the Royal Family undertake public and private functions domestically and abroad as representatives of Antigua and Barbuda. However, the King is the only member of the Royal Family with any constitutional role.

All executive authority is vested in the monarch, and royal assent is required for the Parliament of Antigua and Barbuda to enact laws and for letters patent and Orders in Council to have legal effect. Most of the powers are exercised by the elected members of parliament, the ministers of the Crown generally drawn from amongst them, and the judges and justices of the peace. Other powers vested in the monarch, such as dismissal of a prime minister, are significant but are treated only as reserve powers and as an important security part of the role of the monarchy.

The Crown today primarily functions as a guarantor of continuous and stable governance and a nonpartisan safeguard against the abuse of power. While some powers are exercisable only by the sovereign, most of the monarch's operational and ceremonial duties are exercised by his representative, the governor-general of Antigua and Barbuda.

== Origin ==
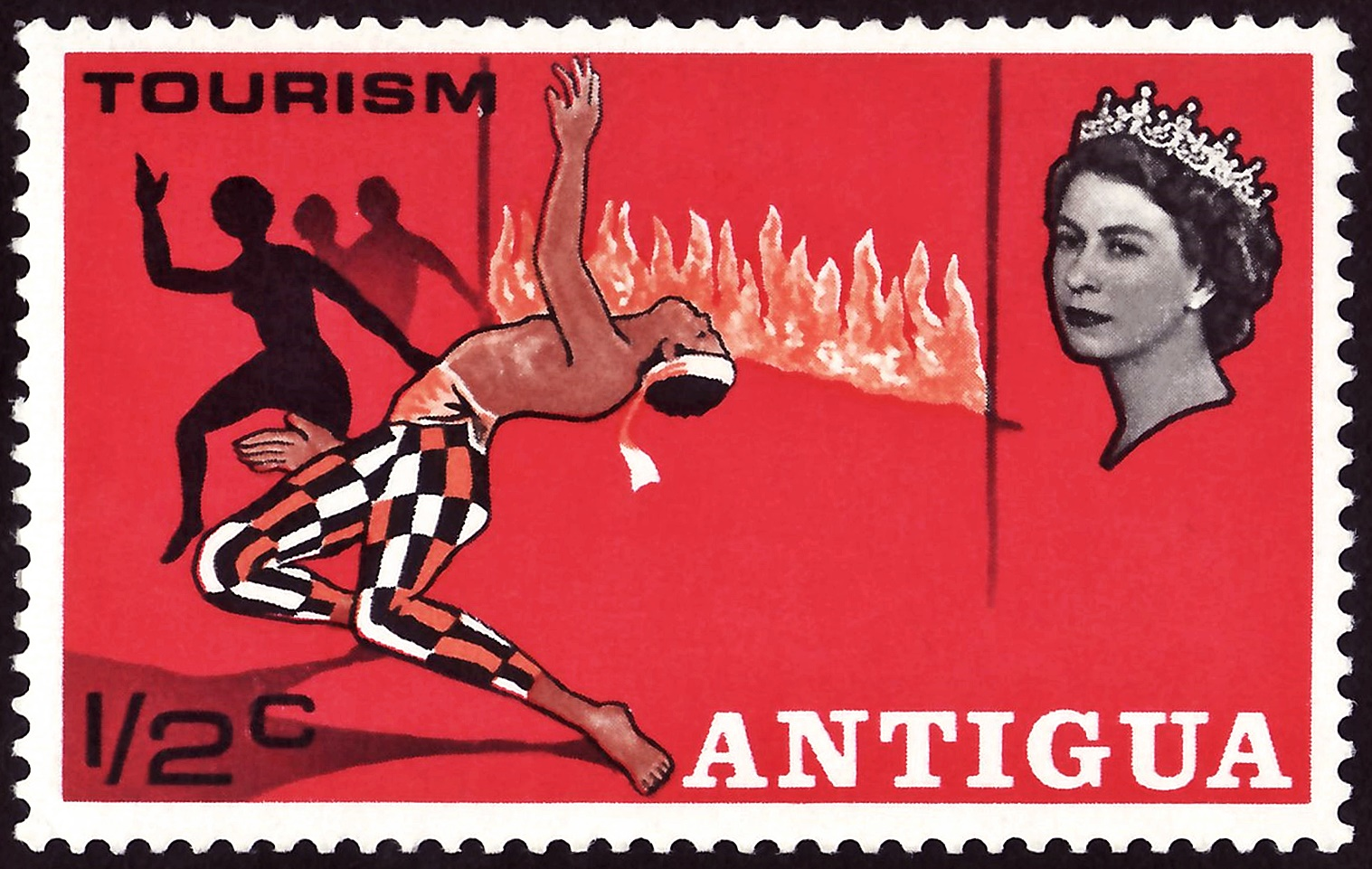
The Queen on a 1968 Antiguan stamp

The island of Antigua was explored by Christopher Columbus in 1493, and became a colony of Britain in 1632; Barbuda island was first colonised in 1678.

In 1736, Prince Klaas, an Afro-Antiguan slave, was elevated to the position of King of the Black Antiguans during an Akan ritual in Saint John's. This event was considered an "innocent ceremony" by white slave owners of Antigua, but was in fact a declaration of war. Prince Klaas planned a rebellion to establish Antigua as an independent state ruled by Africans. He planned to blow up a gunpowder barrel at a ball in honor of King George II, killing all Europeans and signaling allied slave Africans to attack any white person they saw, which would set off a chain of events that would result in Prince Klaas becoming the new King of Antigua. However, the plan was unsuccessful due to the identity of an unknown slave. Despite this, Prince Klaas remains a national hero in Antigua and Barbuda.

Having been part of the Federal Colony of the Leeward Islands from 1871, Antigua and Barbuda joined the West Indies Federation in 1958. With the breakup of the federation, it became one of the West Indies Associated States in 1967. Following self-governance in its internal affairs, independence was granted from the United Kingdom on 1 November 1981. Antigua and Barbuda became a sovereign state and an independent constitutional monarchy within the Commonwealth.

Princess Margaret represented her sister, Queen Elizabeth II, at the independence celebrations in the capital St John's. "Greetings from the Queen, welcome to the Commonwealth", Princess Margaret said at midnight after the flag-raising ceremony. A crowd of thousands cheered "Hip, Hip, Hooray" for the Queen and the prime minister. Wilfred Jacobs was sworn in as the first governor-general, the vice-regal representative of the Queen of Antigua and Barbuda. The Princess presented Antigua and Barbuda's instruments of independence to Prime Minister Vere Bird, formally declaring the country independent. The Princess opened the new Antigua and Barbuda Parliament building, and delivered the Speech from the Throne, on behalf of the Queen.

== The Crown of Antigua and Barbuda and its aspects ==
The insignia of a Warrant Officer Class II of the Antigua and Barbuda Defence Force featuring the St Edward's Crown

Antigua and Barbuda is one of fifteen independent nations, known as Commonwealth realms, which shares its sovereign with other monarchies in the Commonwealth of Nations, with the monarch's relationship with Antigua and Barbuda completely independent from his position as monarch of any other realm. Despite sharing the same person as their respective monarch, each of the Commonwealth realms — including Antigua and Barbuda — is sovereign and independent of the others. The Antiguan and Barbudan monarch is represented by a viceroy—the governor-general of Antigua and Barbuda—in the country.

I will never forget the warmth of your people and the incredible natural beauty of the islands. It has been a great privilege for me to watch Antigua and Barbuda develop into the confident country it is today with a strong national identity and a positive outlook.

— Elizabeth II of Antigua and Barbuda, 2016

Since the independence of Antigua and Barbuda in 1981, the pan-national Crown has had both a shared and a separate character and the sovereign's role as monarch of Antigua and Barbuda is distinct to his or her position as monarch of any other realm, including the United Kingdom. The monarchy thus ceased to be an exclusively British institution and in Antigua and Barbuda became an Antiguan and Barbudan, or "domesticated" establishment.

This division is illustrated in a number of ways: The sovereign, for example, holds a unique Antiguan and Barbudan title and, when he is acting in public specifically as a representative of Antigua and Barbuda, he uses, where possible, national symbols of Antigua and Barbuda, including the country's national flag, unique royal symbols, and the like. Also, only Antiguan and Barbudan government ministers can advise the sovereign on matters of Antigua and Barbuda.

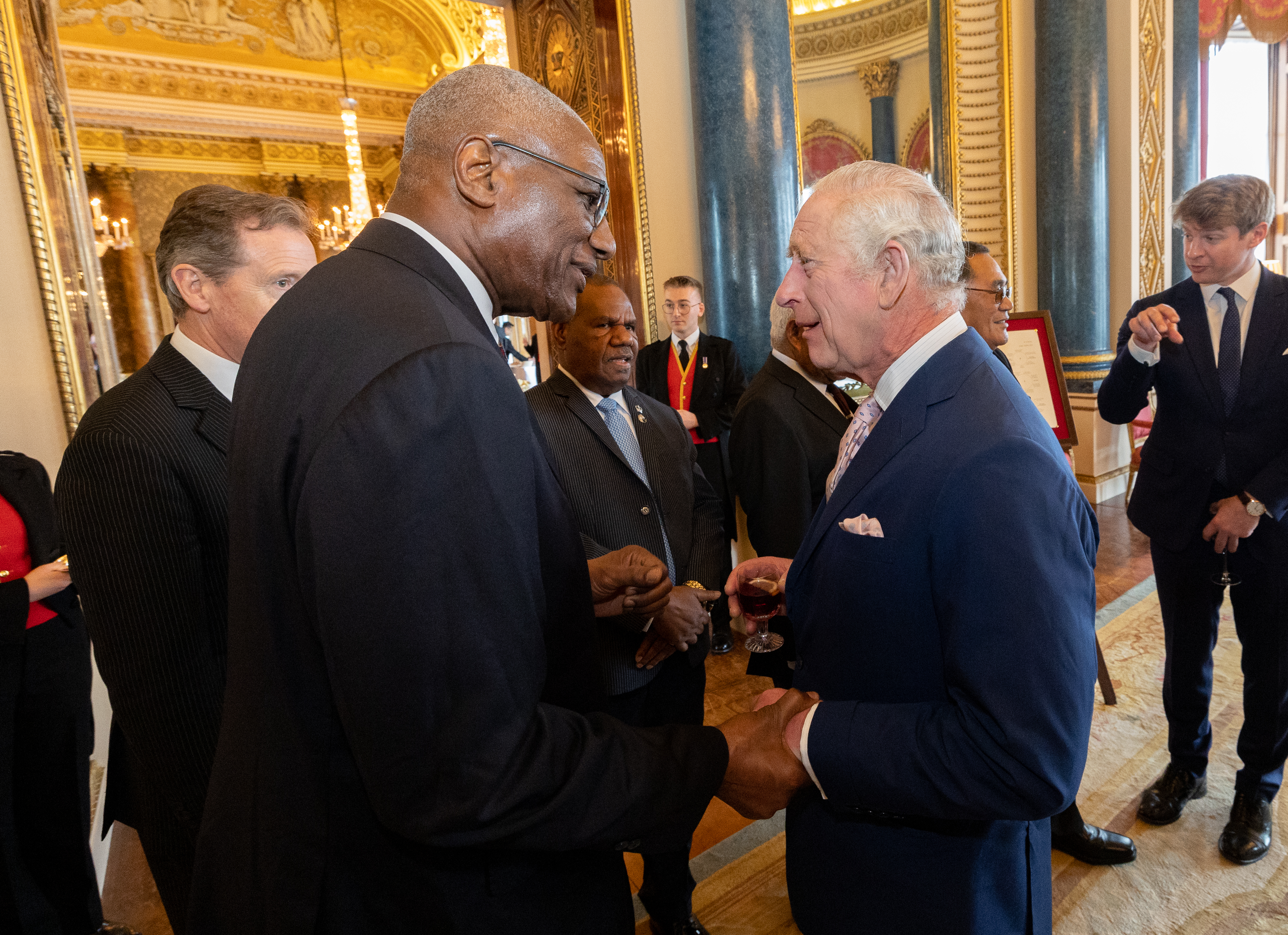
Governor-General Sir Rodney Williams speaking with King Charles III at Buckingham Palace, 2023

In Antigua and Barbuda, the legal personality of the State is referred to as "His Majesty in Right of Antigua and Barbuda".

=== Title ===
The Royal Titles Act, 1981 of the Parliament of Antigua and Barbuda gave Parliament's assent to the adoption of separate style and titles by Queen Elizabeth II in relation to Antigua and Barbuda. Per the Governor-General's Proclamation dated 11 February 1982, the Queen's official style and titles became: Elizabeth the Second, by the Grace of God, Queen of Antigua and Barbuda and of Her other Realms and Territories, Head of the Commonwealth.

Since the accession of King Charles III, the monarch's title is: Charles the Third, by the Grace of God, King of Antigua and Barbuda and His other Realms and Territories, Head of the Commonwealth.

This style communicates Antigua and Barbuda's status as an independent monarchy, highlighting the Monarch's role specifically as Sovereign of Antigua and Barbuda, as well as the shared aspect of the Crown throughout the realms, by mentioning Antigua and Barbuda separately from the other Commonwealth realms. Typically, the Sovereign is styled "King of Antigua and Barbuda" and is addressed as such when in Antigua and Barbuda, or performing duties on behalf of Antigua and Barbuda abroad.

=== Succession ===
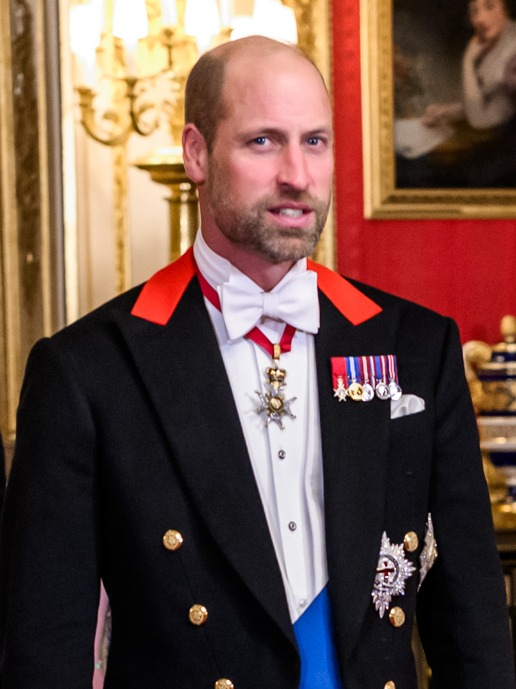
William, Prince of Wales, is the current heir apparent to the throne of Antigua and Barbuda

Like some realms, Antigua and Barbuda defers to United Kingdom law to determine the line of succession.

Succession is by absolute primogeniture governed by the provisions of the Succession to the Crown Act 2013, as well as the Act of Settlement 1701, and the Bill of Rights 1689. This legislation limits the succession to the natural (i.e. non-adopted), legitimate descendants of Sophia, Electress of Hanover, and stipulates that the monarch cannot be a Roman Catholic, and must be in communion with the Church of England upon ascending the throne. Though these constitutional laws, as they apply to Antigua and Barbuda, still lie within the control of the British parliament, both the United Kingdom and Antigua and Barbuda cannot change the rules of succession without the unanimous consent of the other realms, unless explicitly leaving the shared monarchy relationship; a situation that applies identically in all the other realms, and which has been likened to a treaty amongst these countries.

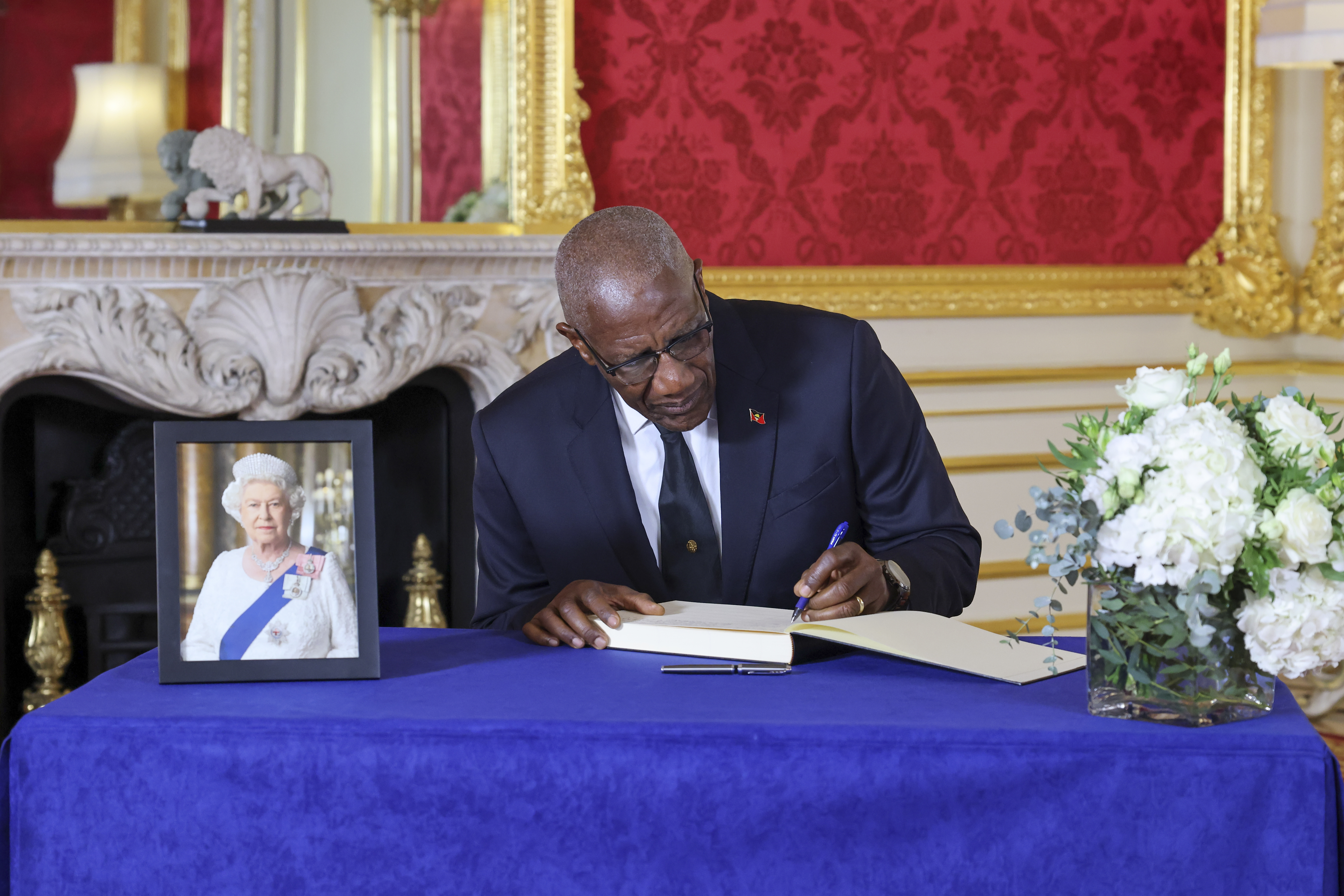
Governor-General Sir Rodney Williams signing the book of condolences in memory of Queen Elizabeth II at Lancaster House, 17 September 2022

Upon a demise of the Crown (the death or abdication of a sovereign), it is customary for the accession of the new monarch to be publicly proclaimed by the governor-general at Government House, St John's, after the accession. Regardless of any proclamations, the late sovereign's heir immediately and automatically succeeds, without any need for confirmation or further ceremony. An appropriate period of mourning also follows, during which flags across the country are flown at half-mast to honour the late monarch. The day of the funeral is likely to be a public holiday.

== Constitutional role and royal prerogative ==
The Queen doesn't interfere with your Government and she provides to foreign investors and others a level of confidence in the constitutional arrangements of your State.

— Fidel Castro, speaking to Prime Minister Lester Bird, 1994

Antigua and Barbuda's constitution is made up of a variety of statutes and conventions, which gives Antigua and Barbuda a similar parliamentary system of government as the other Commonwealth realms. All powers of state are constitutionally reposed in the monarch, who is represented in the country by a governor-general — appointed by the monarch upon the advice of the prime minister of Antigua and Barbuda. As head of state, the sovereign is at the apex of the Order of Precedence of Antigua and Barbuda.

The role of the monarch and the governor-general is both legal and practical; the Crown is regarded as a corporation, in which several parts share the authority of the whole, with the monarch as the person at the centre of the constitutional construct. The Antiguan and Barbudan government is also thus formally referred to as His Majesty's Government in Antigua and Barbuda.

The vast powers that belong to the Crown are collectively known as the Royal Prerogative, which includes many powers such as the ability to make treaties or send ambassadors, as well as certain duties such as to defend the realm and to maintain the King's peace. Parliamentary approval is not required for the exercise of the Royal Prerogative; moreover, the Consent of the Crown must be obtained before either House may even debate a bill affecting the Sovereign's prerogatives or interests.

=== Executive ===
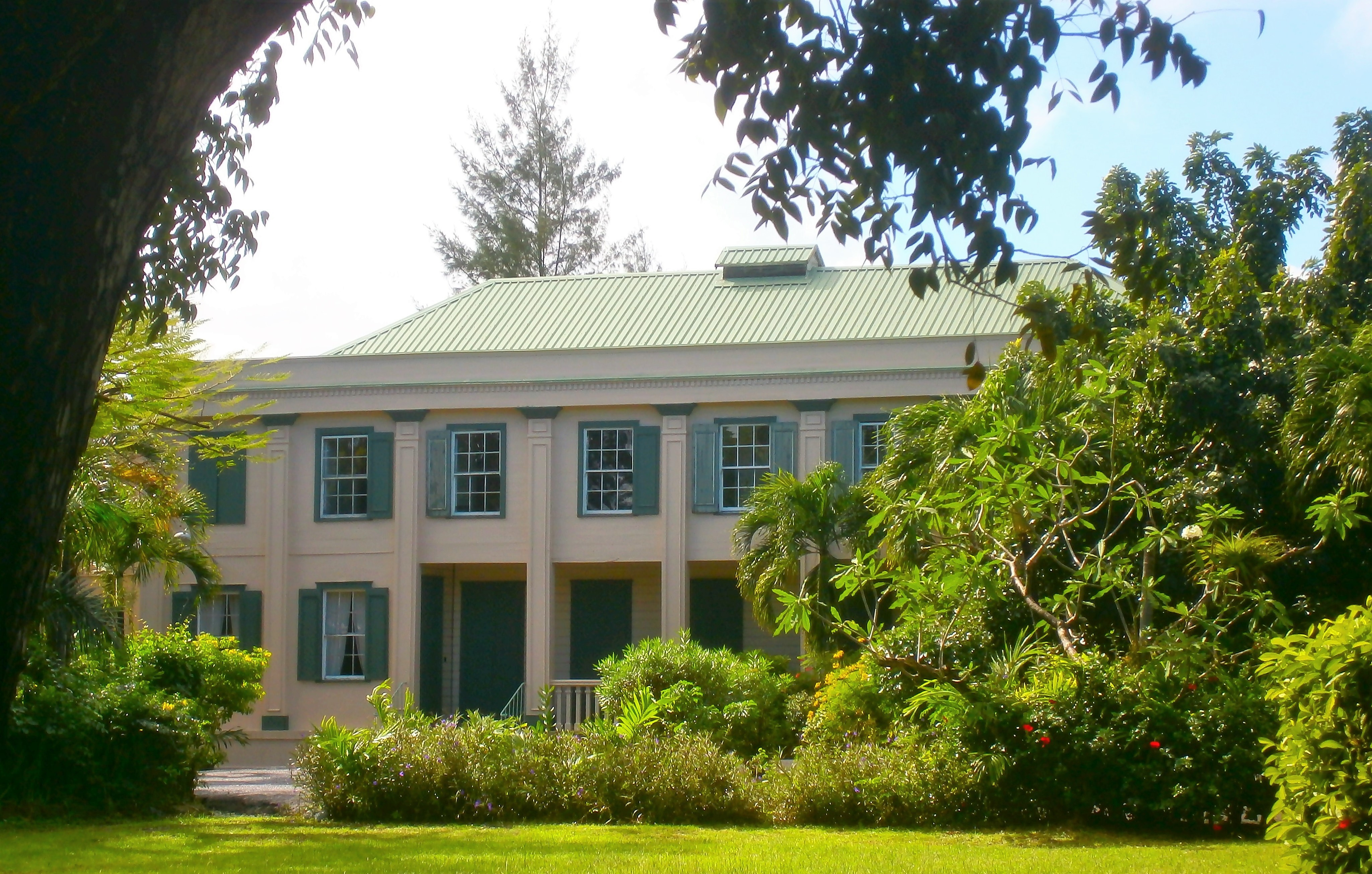
Government House, St. John's, the official residence of the governor-general of Antigua and Barbuda

One of the main duties of the Crown is to appoint a prime minister, who thereafter heads the Cabinet and advises the monarch or governor-general on how to execute their executive powers over all aspects of government operations and foreign affairs. The monarch's, and thereby the viceroy's role is almost entirely symbolic and cultural, acting as a symbol of the legal authority under which all governments and agencies operate, while the Cabinet directs the use of the Royal Prerogative, which includes the privilege to declare war, maintain the King's peace, and direct the actions of the Antigua and Barbuda Defence Force, as well as to summon and prorogue parliament and call elections. However, the Royal Prerogative belongs to the Crown and not to any of the ministers, though it might have sometimes appeared that way, and the constitution allows the governor-general to unilaterally use these powers in relation to the dismissal of a prime minister, dissolution of parliament, and removal of a judge in exceptional, constitutional crisis situations.

There are also a few duties which are specifically performed by the monarch, such as appointing the governor-general.

The governor-general, to maintain the stability of government of Antigua and Barbuda, appoints as prime minister the individual most likely to maintain the support of the House of Representatives. The governor-general additionally appoints a Cabinet, at the direction of the prime minister. The monarch is informed by his viceroy of the acceptance of the resignation of a prime minister and the swearing-in of a new prime minister and other members of the ministry, and he remains fully briefed through regular communications from his Antiguan and Barbudan ministers. Members of various executive agencies and other officials are appointed by the Crown.

=== Foreign affairs ===
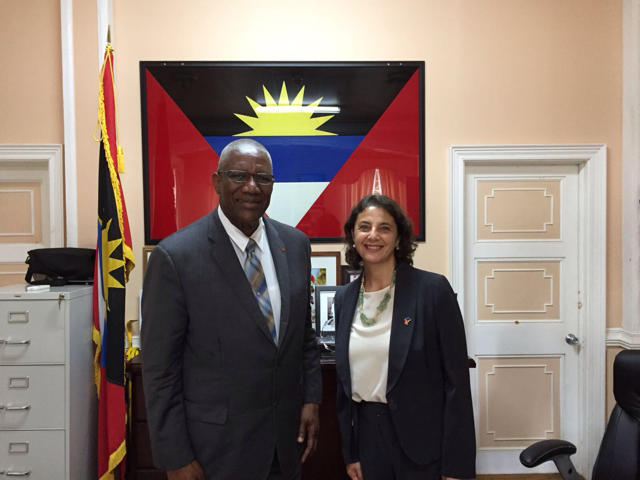
Governor-General Sir Rodney Williams with EU ambassador Daniela Tramacere, 2017

The Royal Prerogative also extends to foreign affairs: the sovereign or the governor-general may negotiate and ratify treaties, alliances, and international agreements; no parliamentary approval is required. However, a treaty cannot alter the domestic laws of Antigua and Barbuda; an Act of Parliament is necessary in such cases. The governor-general, on behalf of the monarch, also accredits Antiguan and Barbudan High Commissioners and ambassadors, and receives diplomats from foreign states.

In addition, the issuance of passports falls under the Royal Prerogative and, as such, all Antiguan and Barbudan passports are issued in the governor-general's name, the monarch's vice-regal representative.

=== Parliament ===
The Sovereign is one of the three components of the Parliament of Antigua and Barbuda; the others are the Senate and the House of Representatives.

The monarch does not, however, participate in the legislative process; the viceroy does, though only in the granting of Royal Assent. Further, the constitution outlines that the governor-general alone is responsible for appointing senators. The viceroy must make eleven senatorial appointments on the advice of the prime minister, four on the advice of leader of the opposition, and one on their own discretion. The viceroy additionally summons, prorogues, and dissolves parliament; after the latter, the writs for a general election are issued by the governor-general at Government House, St. John's.

The Speech from the Throne recognises the sovereignty of the people and the Government's obligation to give account to the populace. Through The Speech from the Throne, the Government accounts to the people for its intentions, as well as for its actions. In this sense, rather than being monarchial, The Speech from the Throne is, in essence, populist in its intent, and in its effect.

— Governor-General Sir James Carlisle, 2005

The new parliamentary session is marked by the State Opening of Parliament, during which the monarch or the governor-general reads the Speech from the Throne.

All laws in Antigua and Barbuda are enacted only with the viceroy's granting of royal assent in the monarch's name, which cannot be refused if a bill has met all constitutional requirements for passage.

=== Courts ===
The sovereign is responsible for rendering justice for all his subjects, and is thus traditionally deemed the fount of justice. In Antigua and Barbuda, criminal offences are legally deemed to be offences against the sovereign and proceedings for indictable offences are brought in the sovereign's name in the form of The King [or Queen] versus [Name]. Hence, the common law holds that the sovereign "can do no wrong"; the monarch cannot be prosecuted in his or her own courts for criminal offences.

The governor-general, on behalf of the monarch of Antigua and Barbuda, can also grant immunity from prosecution, exercise the power of pardon, and pardon offences against the Crown, either before, during, or after a trial. The granting of a pardon and the commutation of prison sentences is described in section 84 of the Constitution.

All judges of the Supreme Court have to swear that they would "well and truly serve" the monarch of Antigua and Barbuda, on taking office.

Any attempt to kill the monarch or the governor-general is considered "high treason", and the person guilty of the offence is sentenced to death.

== Cultural role ==
=== The Crown and Honours ===
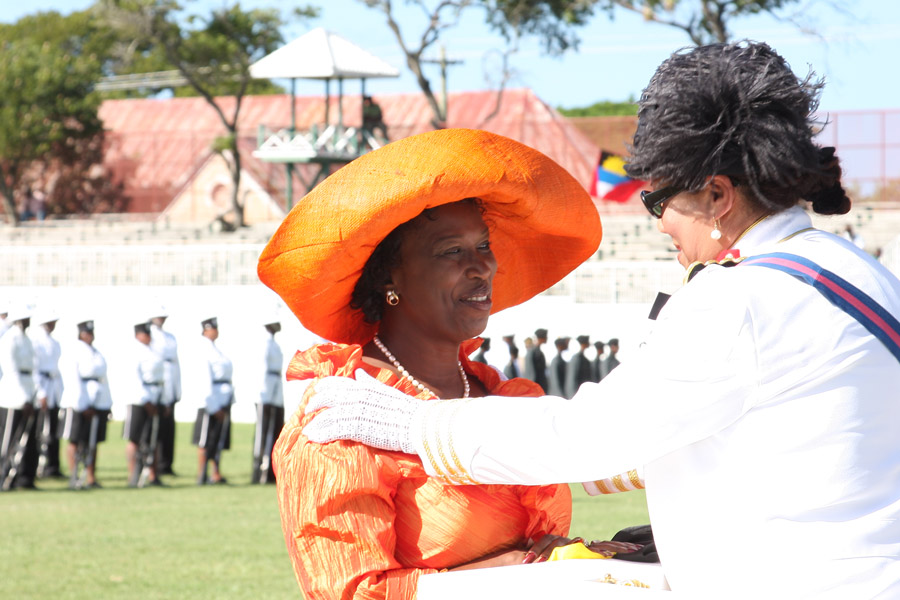
Governor-General Dame Louise Lake-Tack conferring honours at the Independence Day Parade, 2009

Within the Commonwealth realms, the monarch is deemed the fount of honour. Similarly, the monarch, as Sovereign of Antigua and Barbuda, confers awards and honours in Antigua and Barbuda in his name. Most of them are often awarded on the advice of "His Majesty's Antigua and Barbuda Ministers".

Through the passage of the National Honours Act 1998, Antigua and Barbuda established four national orders, namely, the Order of the National Hero, the Order of the Nation, the Order of Merit, and the Order of Princely Heritage. References to St Edward's Crown on the insignia of these orders illustrate the monarchy as the locus of authority. The monarch's vice-regal representative, the governor-general serves as the chancellor of all these orders.

=== The Crown and the Defence Force ===
The rank insignia of a Colonel (left), Lieutenant-Colonel (centre), and Major (right) of the Antigua and Barbuda Defence Force featuring the St Edward's Crown

The Crown sits at the pinnacle of the Antigua and Barbuda Defence Force. The monarch is the Commander-in-Chief of the entire Forces.

The Crown of St. Edward appears on the Antigua and Barbuda Defence Force badges and rank insignia, which illustrates the monarchy as the locus of authority.

Under the Defence Act of Antigua and Barbuda, The power to grant commissions in the Defence Force is vested in the monarch of Antigua and Barbuda, and is exercised on the monarch's behalf by the governor-general.

=== The Crown and the Police Force ===
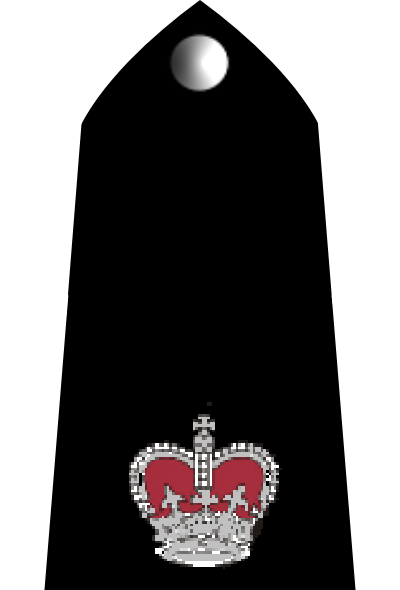
The rank insignia of a Superintendent (left) and Senior Sergeant (right) of the Royal Police Force of Antigua and Barbuda featuring St Edward's Crown

The national police force of Antigua and Barbuda is known as "The Royal Police Force of Antigua and Barbuda".

The St. Edward's Crown appears on the Police Force's badges and rank insignia, which illustrates the monarchy as the locus of authority.

Every member of the Royal Police Force of Antigua and Barbuda has to swear allegiance to the monarch of Antigua and Barbuda, on taking office. Under the Police Act, the oath of office is:

"I, (name), do swear that I will well and truly serve Our Sovereign Lord the King as a member of the Police Force in Antigua and Barbuda without favour or affection, malice or ill-will; and that I will cause His Majesty's peace to be preserved, and will prevent to the utmost of my power, offences against the same; and that, during any time that I do or may hereafter hold any appointment in the Police Force I will to the best of my knowledge and skill discharge all the duties thereof faithfully according to law. So help me God!"

=== Antiguan and Barbudan royal symbols ===
The main symbol of the monarchy of Antigua and Barbuda is the sovereign himself. Thus, framed portraits of him are displayed in public buildings and government offices. The monarch also appears on commemorative Antiguan and Barbudan stamps.

A crown is also used to illustrate the monarchy as the locus of authority, appearing on police force, postal workers, prison officers rank insignia.

God Save The King is the royal anthem of Antigua and Barbuda.

Under the Antigua and Barbuda Citizenship Act, new citizens of Antigua and Barbuda have to take a pledge of allegiance to the monarch, and his heirs and successors.

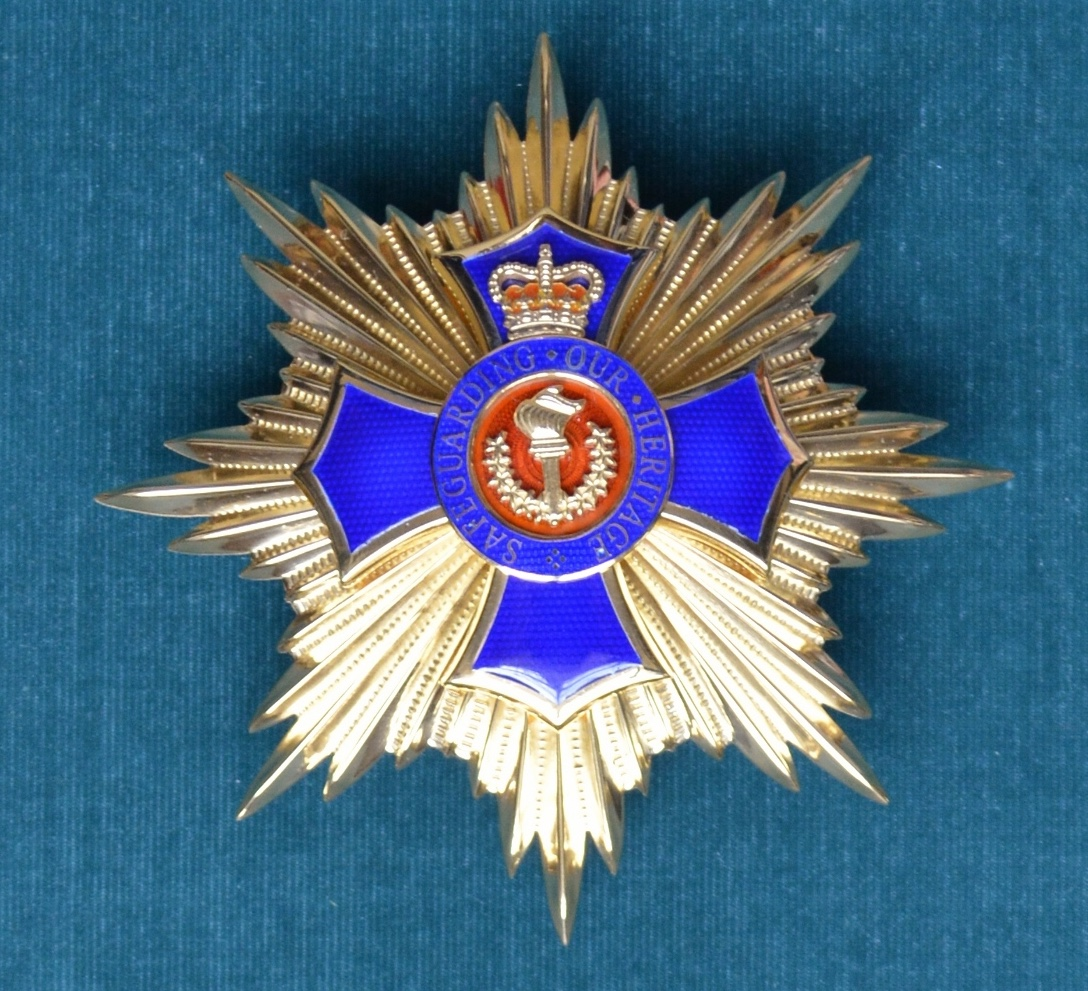
The star of the Order of Princely Heritage of Antigua and Barbuda featuring St Edward's Crown

The flag of the Antiguan and Barbudan governor-general featuring the Tudor Crown

The emblem of the Royal Police Force of Antigua and Barbuda featuring the Crown

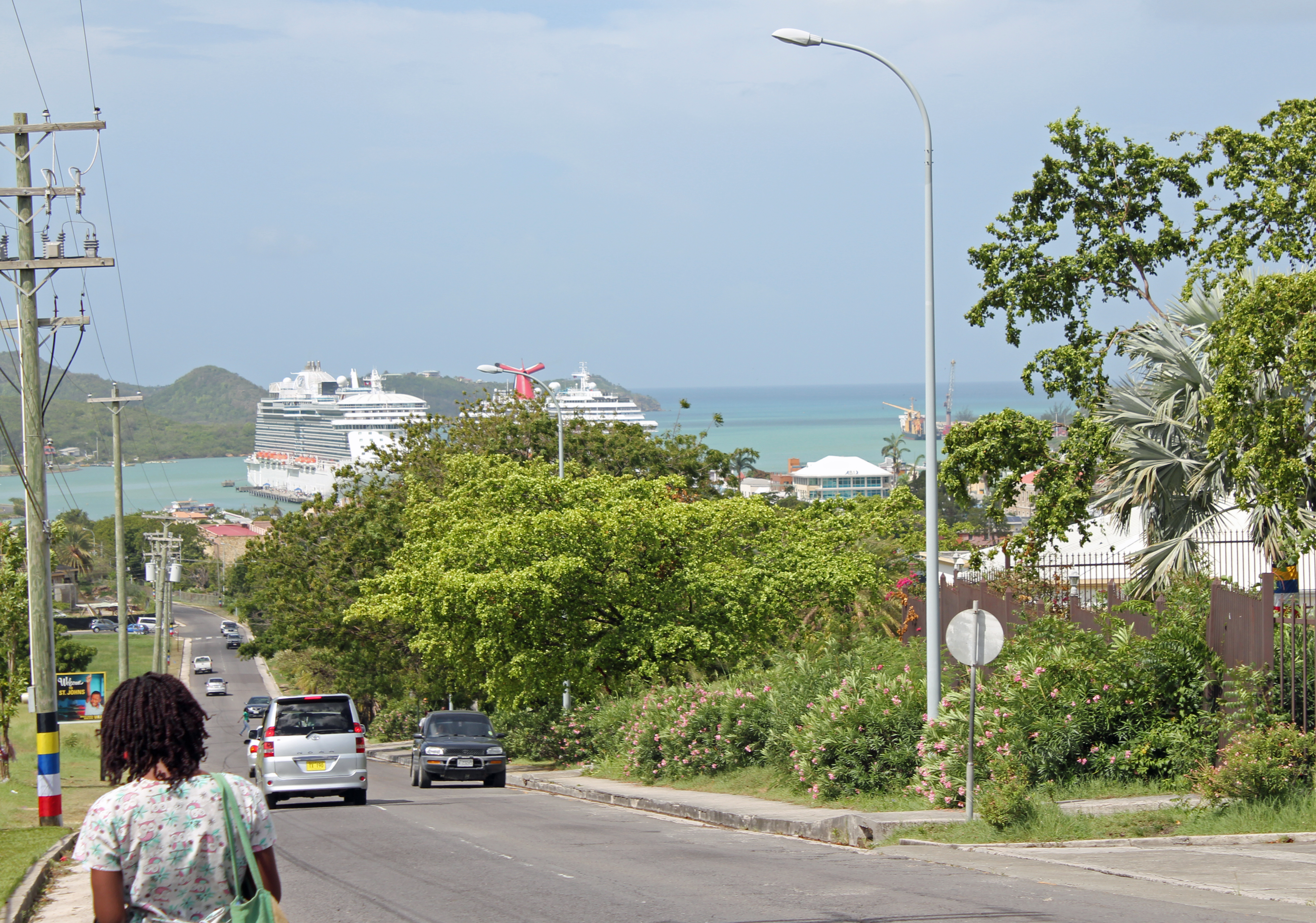
The Queen Elizabeth Highway in Antigua and Barbuda

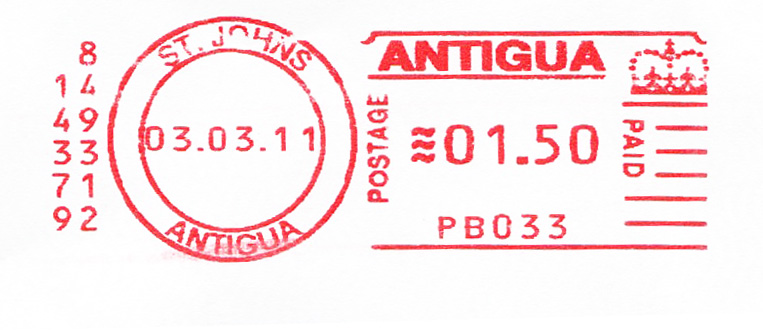
Antigua meter stamp featuring St Edward's Crown

=== Royal visits ===
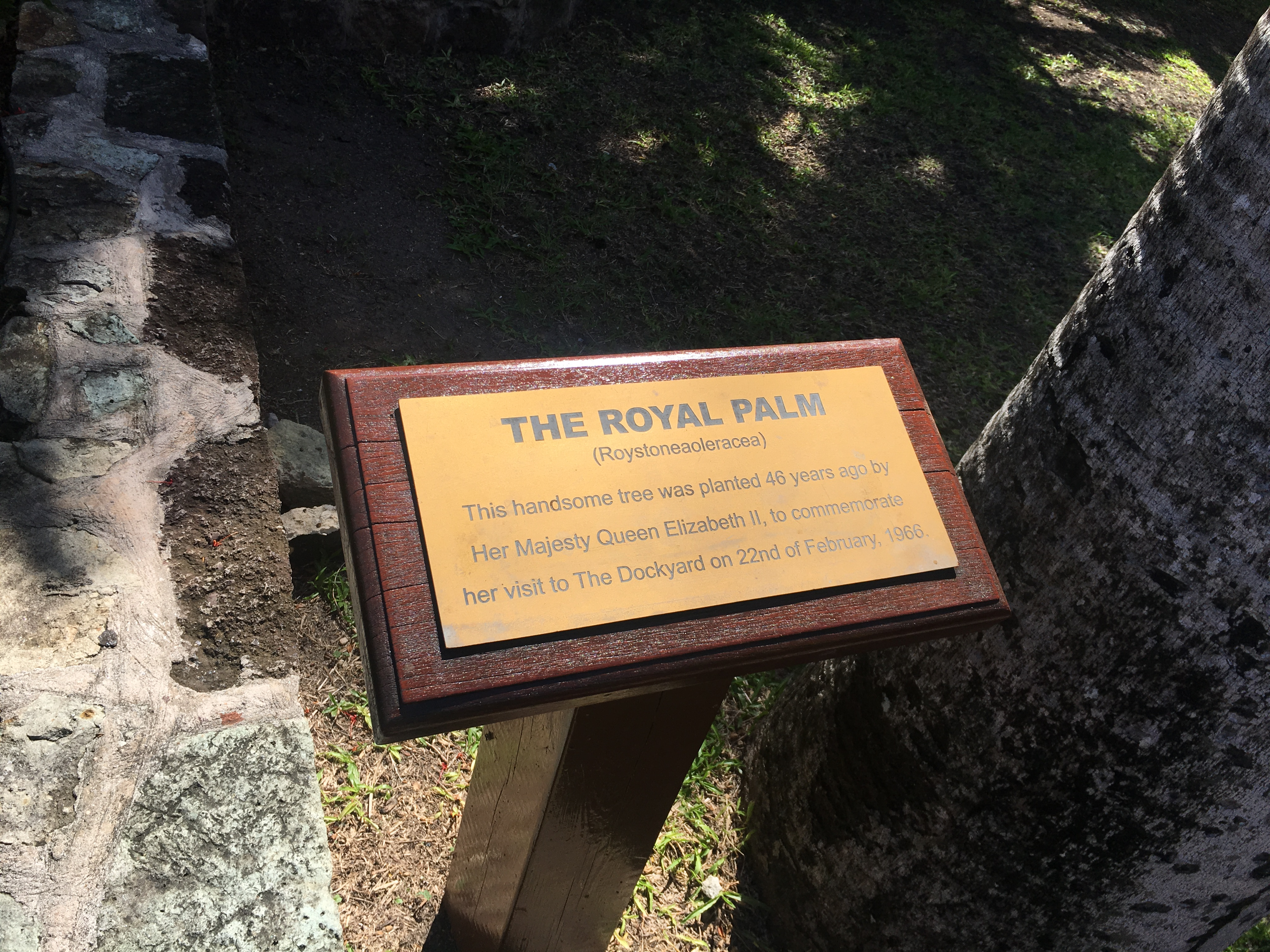
A plaque commemorating the planting of a palm tree by the Queen in 1966 at Nelson's Dockyard, Antigua

Princess Margaret visited Antigua in 1955. Queen Elizabeth The Queen Mother visited on 17 March 1964. Princess Alice visited on 10 and 19 March 1964 during her Caribbean tour as Chancellor of the University of the West Indies. The Duke of Edinburgh visited in November 1964.

Queen Elizabeth II, and her consort, the Duke of Edinburgh, visited Antigua and Barbuda during their Caribbean tour of 1966. During the visit, they visited the capital city of Saint John's, where they attended an Investiture at Government House and Divine Service at St John's Cathedral at which Prince Philip read the lesson. The Queen and the Duke visited again during the Silver Jubilee tour of October 1977, staying onboard HMY Britannia. The Queen opened the New Administration Building and attended a lunch held by the Governor at Clarence House.

Princess Margaret represented the Queen at the independence celebrations in 1981.

The Queen of Antigua and Barbuda visited in 1985, and met patients and staff in the new Children's Ward of the Holberton Hospital following a Commonwealth Heads of Government Meeting in the Bahamas.

The Duke of York visited in January 2001. The Earl of Wessex visited Antigua and Barbuda in October 2003 as Trustee of The Duke of Edinburgh's Award International Association. The Earl of Wessex visited again in 2006 to represent the Queen at the celebrations marking the country's twenty fifth anniversary of independence.

I have cherished very special memories of this region – of its breath-taking beauty and the tremendous warmth and generosity of its people – and I have never underestimated their astonishing prowess as cricketers!

— Charles, Prince of Wales, 2017

In March 2012, the Earl and Countess of Wessex, visited Antigua and Barbuda to mark the Queen's Diamond Jubilee. Prince Harry visited in 2016 to mark the 35th anniversary of independence of Antigua and Barbuda. In November 2017, the Prince of Wales visited Antigua and Barbuda to see how communities were recovering following the devastation caused by Hurricanes Irma and Maria.

The Earl and Countess of Wessex visited in April 2022 to mark the Queen's Platinum Jubilee.

In November 2026, Charles III, King of Antigua and Barbuda and Queen Camilla paid a four-day visit to Antigua and Barbuda, participating in a range of events including celebrations of the country's 45th anniversary of independence and attendance at the 2026 Commonwealth Heads of Government Meeting.

== Republicanism ==
The monarchy is not a major topic of debate in Antigua and Barbuda. In 2020, Information Minister, Melford Nicholas stated that the country may examine the possibility of transition to a republic in some point in the future.

In 2022, Prime Minister Gaston Browne said he aspires the country to become a republic "at some point", and acknowledged that such a move is "not on the cards", and Antigua and Barbuda will continue as a monarchy for "some time to follow". On 10 September 2022, following the proclamation of Charles III as king, Browne stated that he planned to hold a referendum within three years on becoming a republic.

In December 2025, a constitutional amendment to remove references to the monarch from the oath of allegiance was passed by both houses of parliament. It received bipartisan support and, under section 47(5) of the constitution, did not require a referendum or any waiting period. The amendment came into force on 1 January 2026.

== List of Antiguan and Barbudan monarchs ==
Portrait	Regnal name	Reign over Antigua and Barbuda		Full name	Consort	House
Portrait	Regnal name	Start	End	Full name	Consort	House
	Elizabeth II (1926–2022)	1 November 1981	8 September 2022	Elizabeth Alexandra Mary	Prince Philip, Duke of Edinburgh	Windsor
	Elizabeth II (1926–2022)	Governors-general: Sir Wilfred Jacobs, Sir James Carlisle, Dame Louise Lake-Tack, Sir Rodney Williams; Prime ministers: Vere Bird, Lester Bird, Baldwin Spencer, Gaston Browne				
	Charles III (b. 1948)	8 September 2022	present	Charles Philip Arthur George	Queen Camilla	Windsor
	Charles III (b. 1948)	Governors-general: Sir Rodney Williams; Prime ministers: Gaston Browne				

== See also ==
- Lists of office-holders
- List of prime ministers of Elizabeth II
- List of prime ministers of Charles III
- List of Commonwealth visits made by Elizabeth II
- Monarchies in the Americas
- List of monarchies
- King Court Tackey
