= List of titles and honours of Charles III =

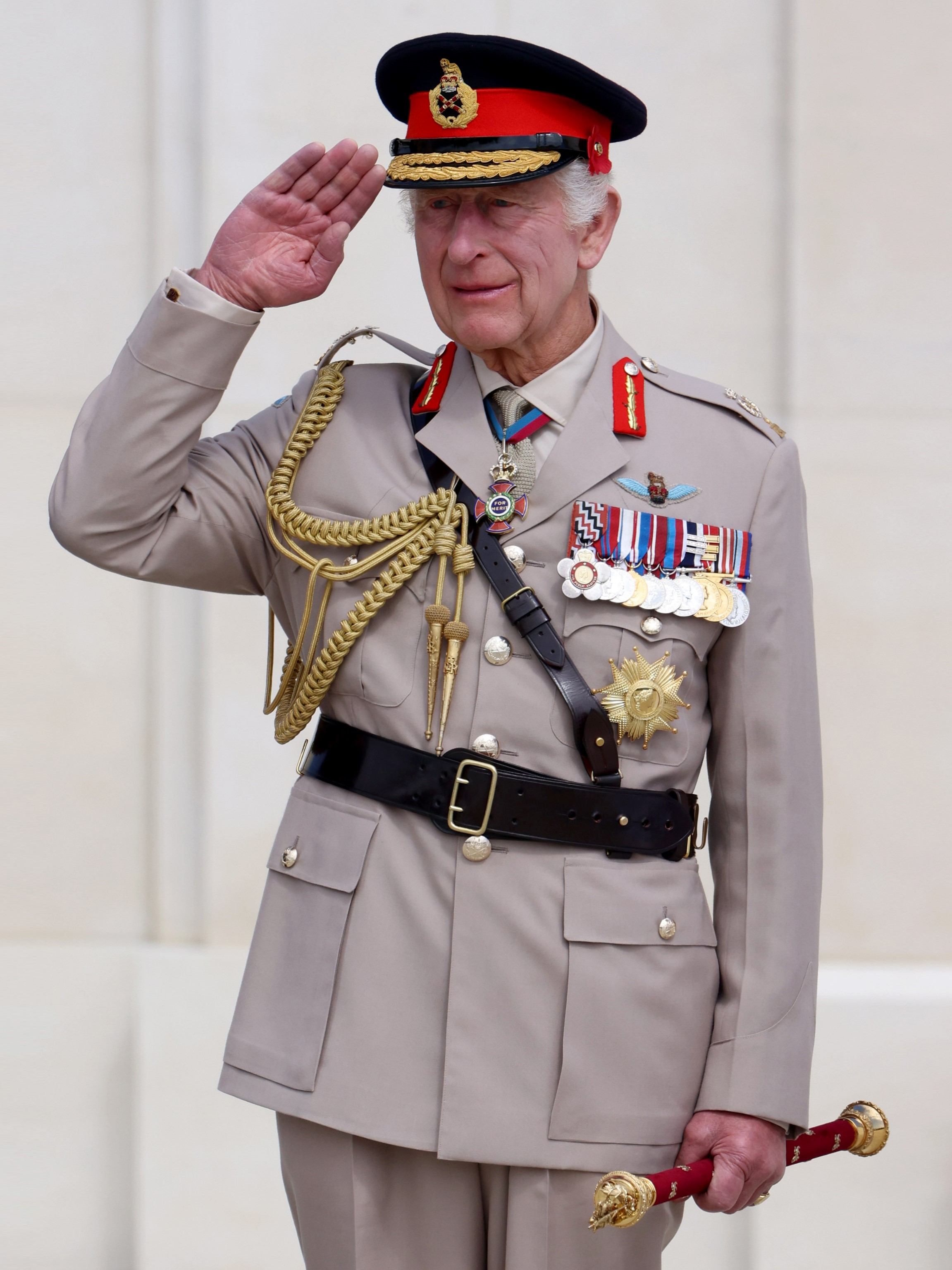
King Charles III in 2024

Charles III has received numerous titles, decorations, and honorary appointments, as a member of the British royal family, as heir apparent to Elizabeth II, and as King of the United Kingdom and the 14 other Commonwealth realms.

== Royal and noble titles and styles ==
Charles was originally styled as "His Royal Highness Prince Charles of Edinburgh" per letters patent issued by his grandfather George VI.

Upon the accession of his mother as queen, as the eldest son of the monarch, he automatically became, in England, the Duke of Cornwall and, in Scotland, the Duke of Rothesay, Earl of Carrick, Baron of Renfrew, Lord of the Isles, and Prince and Great Steward of Scotland. As such, he was styled "His Royal Highness The Duke of Cornwall", except in Scotland, where he was known as "His Royal Highness The Duke of Rothesay" instead.

In 1958, letters patent from the then sovereign made Charles the Prince of Wales and Earl of Chester and, on 1 July 1969, he was invested as such during a ceremony in which a coronet and robes were placed on him. In 2021, upon the death of his father, Prince Philip, Charles furthermore inherited the titles Duke of Edinburgh, Earl of Merioneth, and Baron Greenwich. When he became the British sovereign himself on 8 September 2022, these titles merged in the Crown.

Titles as Prince Charles
Title	From		To	
Title	Date	Reason	Date	Reason
Duke of Cornwall	6 February 1952	His mother's accession (automatically)	8 September 2022	Acceded as Charles III (titles transferred to the new heir apparent)
Duke of Rothesay	6 February 1952	His mother's accession (automatically)	8 September 2022	Acceded as Charles III (titles transferred to the new heir apparent)
Earl of Carrick	6 February 1952	His mother's accession (automatically)	8 September 2022	Acceded as Charles III (titles transferred to the new heir apparent)
Baron of Renfrew	6 February 1952	His mother's accession (automatically)	8 September 2022	Acceded as Charles III (titles transferred to the new heir apparent)
Lord of the Isles	6 February 1952	His mother's accession (automatically)	8 September 2022	Acceded as Charles III (titles transferred to the new heir apparent)
Prince and Great Steward of Scotland	6 February 1952	His mother's accession (automatically)	8 September 2022	Acceded as Charles III (titles transferred to the new heir apparent)
Prince of Wales	26 July 1958	Granted to the heir apparent	8 September 2022	Acceded as Charles III (titles merged in the Crown)
Earl of Chester	26 July 1958	Granted to the heir apparent	8 September 2022	Acceded as Charles III (titles merged in the Crown)
Duke of Edinburgh	9 April 2021	Death of his father (inherited)	8 September 2022	Acceded as Charles III (titles merged in the Crown)
Earl of Merioneth	9 April 2021	Death of his father (inherited)	8 September 2022	Acceded as Charles III (titles merged in the Crown)
Baron Greenwich	9 April 2021	Death of his father (inherited)	8 September 2022	Acceded as Charles III (titles merged in the Crown)

Royal cypher of Charles III, surmounted by the Tudor Crown

Scottish royal cypher of Charles III, surmounted by the Crown of Scotland

Canadian royal cypher of Charles III, surmounted by the Canadian Royal Crown

=== Regnal name ===
In an announcement following the death of Queen Elizabeth II, Prime Minister Liz Truss referred to Charles as King Charles III, the first official usage of that name. Shortly afterwards Clarence House confirmed that he would use the regnal name Charles III.

There had previously been speculation that he might choose a different name, because the previous two monarchs named Charles are both associated with negative events in royal history: Charles I was beheaded in 1649 and Charles II reigned during the Great Plague and the Great Fire of London. The name Charles III is also associated with the Jacobite pretender, Charles Edward Stuart, who claimed the throne under that name in the 18th century. The most discussed alternative regnal name had been George VII, in honour of Charles' maternal grandfather; although, prior to succeeding to the throne, Charles denied discussing a regnal name at all.

=== Regnal style ===
Each Commonwealth realm acts as an independent monarchy but in a personal union; as such, King Charles has different titles in each realm:

Country	Date	Title
Antigua and Barbuda	8 September 2022 – present	Charles the Third, by the Grace of God, King of Antigua and Barbuda and His other Realms and Territories, Head of the Commonwealth
Australia	8 September 2022 – present	King Charles the Third, by the Grace of God King of Australia and His other Realms and Territories, Head of the Commonwealth (Note: It has been noted that the inclusion of the word "King" before "Charles" in the official proclamation of the King's title is inconsistent with that of Queen Elizabeth II and the King's title in other realms. It also legally disputed whether this proclamation has legal force or whether a new style and title act needs to be adopted, with the Department of the Prime Minister and Cabinet giving conflicting advice on the matter.)
The Bahamas	8 September 2022 – present	Charles the Third, by the Grace of God King of the Commonwealth of The Bahamas and of His other Realms and Territories, Head of the Commonwealth
Belize	8 September 2022 – present	Charles the Third, by the Grace of God, King of Belize and of His other Realms and Territories, Head of the Commonwealth
Canada	8 September 2022 – 8 January 2024	English: Charles the Third, by the Grace of God of the United Kingdom, Canada and His other Realms and Territories King, Head of the Commonwealth, Defender of the Faith French: Charles Trois, par la grâce de Dieu, Roi du Royaume-Uni, du Canada et de ses autres royaumes et territoires, Chef du Commonwealth, Défenseur de la Foi
Canada	8 January 2024 – present	English: Charles the Third, by the Grace of God King of Canada and His other Realms and Territories, Head of the Commonwealth French: Charles Trois, par la grâce de Dieu Roi du Canada et de ses autres royaumes et territoires, Chef du Commonwealth In spring 2023, the Canadian government introduced a bill changing the monarch's title by dropping the reference to the United Kingdom and the phrase Defender of the Faith. The bill received royal assent on 22 June 2023; a proclamation of the new title was issued on 8 January 2024.
Grenada	8 September 2022 – present	Charles the Third, by the Grace of God, King of Grenada and of His other Realms and Territories, Head of the Commonwealth
Jamaica	8 September 2022 – present	Charles the Third, by the Grace of God of Jamaica and of His other Realms and Territories King, Head of the Commonwealth
New Zealand	8 September 2022 – present	English: King Charles the Third, by the Grace of God King of New Zealand and of His Other Realms and Territories, Head of the Commonwealth, Defender of the Faith Māori: Kīngi Tiāre te Tuatoru, na te huatau o te Atua, te Kīngi o Aotearoa me ērā atu o Ōna Whaitua, rohe hoki, te Upoko o te Kāhui Whenua, te Kaiwawao o te Whakapono
Papua New Guinea	8 September 2022 – present	King Charles the Third, King of Papua New Guinea and His other Realms and Territories, Head of the Commonwealth
Saint Kitts and Nevis	8 September 2022 – present	King Charles the Third by the Grace of God, King of Saint Christopher and Nevis and of His other Realms and Territories, Head of the Commonwealth
Saint Lucia	8 September 2022 – present	Charles the Third, by the Grace of God, King of Saint Lucia and of His other Realms and Territories, Head of the Commonwealth
Saint Vincent and the Grenadines	8 September 2022 – present	Charles the Third, by the Grace of God, King of Saint Vincent and the Grenadines and His other Realms and Territories, Head of the Commonwealth
Solomon Islands	8 September 2022 – present	Charles the Third, by the Grace of God, King of Solomon Islands and His other Realms and Territories, Head of the Commonwealth
Tuvalu	8 September 2022 – present	Charles the Third, by the Grace of God, King of Tuvalu and of His other Realms and Territories, Head of the Commonwealth
United Kingdom	8 September 2022 – present	English: Charles the Third, by the Grace of God of the United Kingdom of Great Britain and Northern Ireland and of his other Realms and Territories, King, Head of the Commonwealth, Defender of the Faith Welsh: Charles y Trydydd, drwy Ras Duw, ar Deyrnas Unedig Prydain Fawr a Gogledd Iwerddon a’i Deyrnasoedd eraill, yn Frenin, yn Ben ar y Gymanwlad, yn Amddiffynnwr y Ffydd

The King's full British styles and titles were read out at the state funeral of his mother by David White, Garter Principal King of Arms, as follows:

Let us humbly beseech Almighty God to bless with long life, health and honour, and all worldly happiness the Most High, Most Mighty and Most Excellent Monarch, our Sovereign Lord, Charles III, now, by the Grace of God, of the United Kingdom of Great Britain and Northern Ireland and of His other Realms and Territories King, Head of the Commonwealth, Defender of the Faith, and Sovereign of the Most Noble Order of the Garter.

In conversation, the correct etiquette is to address him initially as Your Majesty and thereafter as Sir.

=== Commonwealth ===
On 20 April 2018, the Commonwealth Heads of Government agreed that Charles would succeed his mother as Head of the Commonwealth, which he did on her death on 8 September 2022.

=== Ecclesiastical titles ===
King Charles has Defender of the Faith as part of his title in both the United Kingdom and New Zealand. The phrase was dropped from his Canadian title in 2024.

He is also Supreme Governor of the Church of England, as the Church of England is the established church in that country.

=== Other (United Kingdom, Crown dependencies and British Overseas Territories) ===
From 8 September 2022
Region	Date	Ref.
United Kingdom
England	Seigneur of the Swans	
Duchy of Lancaster	Duke of Lancaster	
Scotland	King of Scots	
Braemar, Scotland	Chieftain of the Braemar Gathering	
Caithness, Scotland	Chieftain of the Mey Highland Games	
Crown dependencies
Guernsey	Duke of Normandy and King in right of the Bailiwick of Guernsey	
Isle of Man	Lord of Mann	
Jersey	Duke of Normandy and King in right of the Bailiwick of Jersey	
British Overseas Territories
Gibraltar	King of Gibraltar	(Note: The kingship of Gibraltar continues to be among the titles of the Spanish monarchy. However, since 2010 the Government of Gibraltar has started to use the title "Queen of Gibraltar" in reference to Elizabeth II. Initially only used on coinage, the title now appears on several Gibraltar and UK government documents referencing the Queen in relation to Gibraltar.)

=== Other ===
Region	Title	Refs.
Alberta, Canada	In Blackfoot: Mekaisto; In English: Chief Red Crow	
Manitoba, Canada	Leading Star	
Nunavut, Canada Saskatchewan, Canada	In Inuktitut: Attaniout Ikeneego; In English: The Son of the Big Boss (loosely translates to heir apparent)	
Samoa	In Samoan: Tui Taumeasina; In English: King of Taumeasina	
Samoa	In Samoan: Toa'iga o Tumua; In English: Paramount chief	
Tanzania	In Maasai: Oloishiru Ingishi; In English: The Helper of the Cows (literally he whom the cows love so much they call for him when they are in times of distress)	
Papua New Guinea	In Tok Pisin: Nambawan pikinini bilong Misis Kwin; In English: Number One Child of Mrs. Queen	
Vanuatu	High Chief Mal Menaringmanu	

== Military and police ranks and titles ==
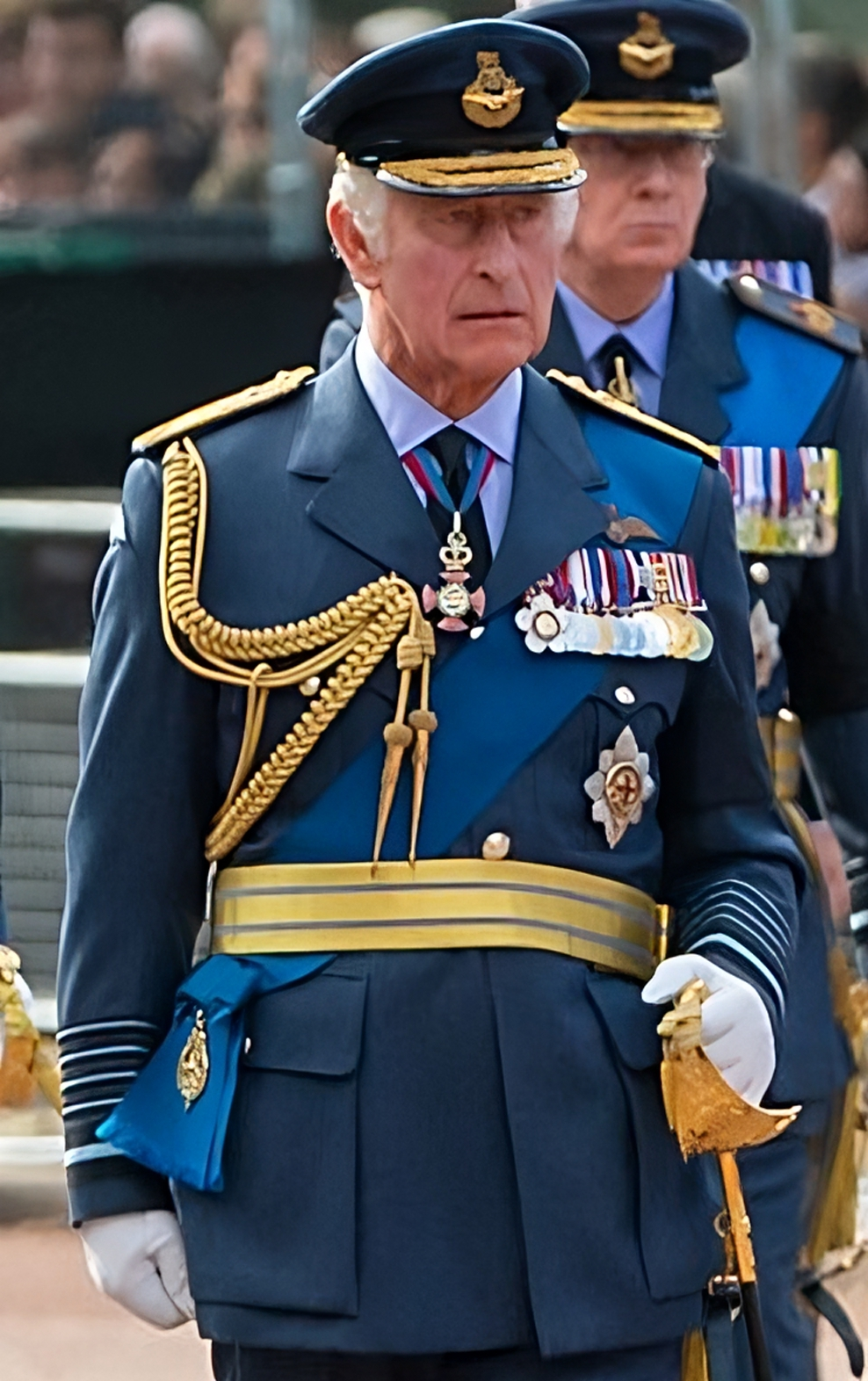
King Charles III in the No. 1A Service Dress (Ceremonial Day Dress) uniform of a Marshal of the Royal Air Force

=== Military ranks ===
Flag	Date	Rank	Branch	Ref
Australia
	19 October 2024 – present	Admiral of the Fleet	Royal Australian Navy	
(Australia)	19 October 2024 – present	Field Marshal	Australian Army	
(Australia)	19 October 2024 – present	Marshal of the Royal Australian Air Force		
Canada
	11 November 2009 – 8 September 2022	Vice-Admiral	Royal Canadian Navy	
(Canada)	11 November 2009 – 8 September 2022	Lieutenant-General	Canadian Army	
(Canada)	11 November 2009 – 8 September 2022	Lieutenant-General	Royal Canadian Air Force	
New Zealand
(New Zealand)	2015 – present	Admiral of the Fleet	Royal New Zealand Navy	
(New Zealand)	2015 – present	Field Marshal	New Zealand Army	
(New Zealand)	2015 – present	Marshal of the Royal New Zealand Air Force		
United Kingdom
(United Kingdom)	8 March 1971 – 1 January 1977	Flight Lieutenant	Royal Air Force	
(United Kingdom)	15 September 1971 – 1 September 1972	Acting Sub-Lieutenant	Royal Navy	
(United Kingdom)	27 July 1973 – 1 January 1977	Lieutenant	Royal Navy	
(United Kingdom)	1 January 1977 – 14 November 1988	Commander	Royal Navy	
(United Kingdom)	1 January 1977 – 14 November 1988	Wing Commander	Royal Air Force	
(United Kingdom)	14 November 1988 – 14 November 1998	Captain	Royal Navy	
(United Kingdom)	14 November 1988 – 14 November 1998	Group Captain	Royal Air Force	
(United Kingdom)	14 November 1998 – 14 November 2002	Rear-Admiral	Royal Navy	
(United Kingdom)	14 November 1998 – 14 November 2002	Major-General	British Army	
(United Kingdom)	14 November 1998 – 14 November 2002	Air Vice-Marshal	Royal Air Force	
(United Kingdom)	14 November 2002 – 14 November 2006	Vice-Admiral	Royal Navy	
(United Kingdom)	14 November 2002 – 14 November 2006	Lieutenant-General	British Army	
(United Kingdom)	14 November 2002 – 14 November 2006	Air Marshal	Royal Air Force	
(United Kingdom)	14 November 2006 – 16 June 2012	Admiral	Royal Navy	
(United Kingdom)	14 November 2006 – 16 June 2012	General	British Army	
(United Kingdom)	14 November 2006 – 16 June 2012	Air Chief Marshal	Royal Air Force	
(United Kingdom)	16 June 2012 – present	Admiral of the Fleet	Royal Navy	
(United Kingdom)	16 June 2012 – present	Field Marshal	British Army	
(United Kingdom)	16 June 2012 – present	Marshal of the Royal Air Force		

=== Military titles ===
Country	Date	Appointment	Ref
Canada	8 September 2022 – present	Commander-in-Chief of the Canadian Armed Forces	
New Zealand	8 September 2022 – present	Head of the Armed Forces	
United Kingdom	8 September 2022 – present	Head of the Armed Forces	

=== Police appointments ===
Service	Date	Appointment	Ref
Royal Canadian Mounted Police	23 May 2012 – 28 April 2023	Honorary Commissioner	
Royal Canadian Mounted Police	28 April 2023 – present	Commissioner-in-Chief	

=== Honorary military appointments ===
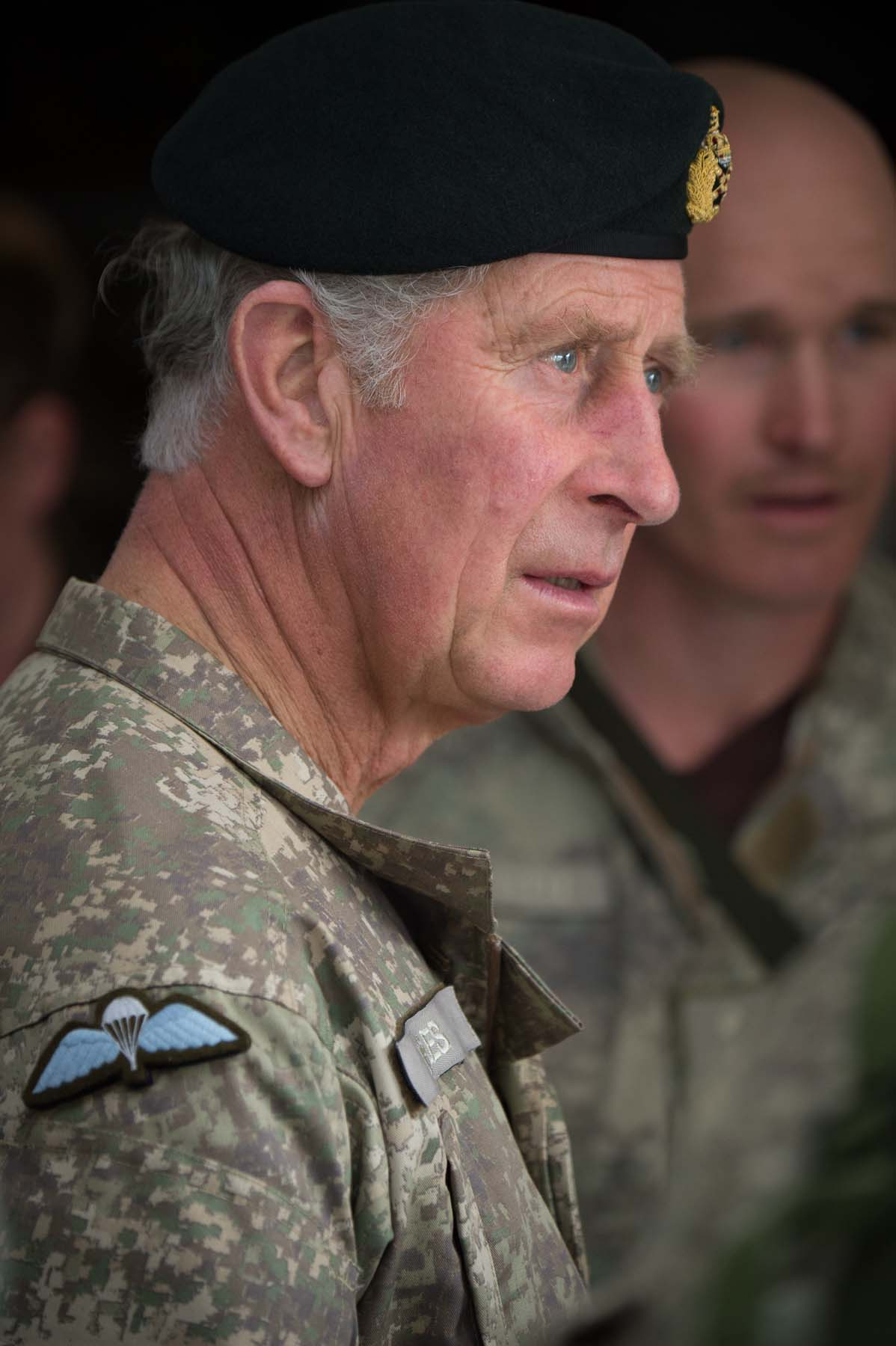
King Charles III in the uniform of a Field Marshal of the New Zealand Army

Australia

- (Australia) 1977 – present: Colonel-in-Chief of the Royal Australian Armoured Corps
- (Australia) 2023 – present: Captain-General of the Royal Australian Artillery

Canada

- (Canada) 1977 – present: Colonel-in-Chief of Lord Strathcona's Horse (Royal Canadians)
- (Canada) 1977 – present: Colonel-in-Chief of the Royal Winnipeg Rifles
- 1977 – present: Colonel-in-Chief of the Royal Regiment of Canada
- (Canada) 1985 – present: Colonel-in-Chief of the Royal Canadian Dragoons
- 2004 – present: Colonel-in-Chief of the Black Watch (Royal Highland Regiment) of Canada
- (Canada) 2005 – present: Colonel-in-Chief of the Toronto Scottish Regiment (Queen Elizabeth The Queen Mother's Own)
- (Canada) 2009 – present: Head of the Canadian Rangers
- (Canada) 2022 – present: Colonel-in-Chief of the Governor General's Horse Guards
- (Canada) 2023 – present: Captain General of the Royal Regiment of Canadian Artillery
- (Canada) 1977 – present: Colonel-in-Chief of the Air Reserve Group
- (Canada) 2015 – present: Commodore-in-Chief of the Royal Canadian Navy (Fleet Atlantic)

New Zealand

- 1977–2015: Air Commodore-in-Chief of the Royal New Zealand Air Force
- 2023 – present: Captain-General of the Royal New Zealand Artillery

Papua New Guinea

- (Papua New Guinea) 1984 – present: Colonel-in-Chief of the Royal Pacific Islands Regiment

United Kingdom

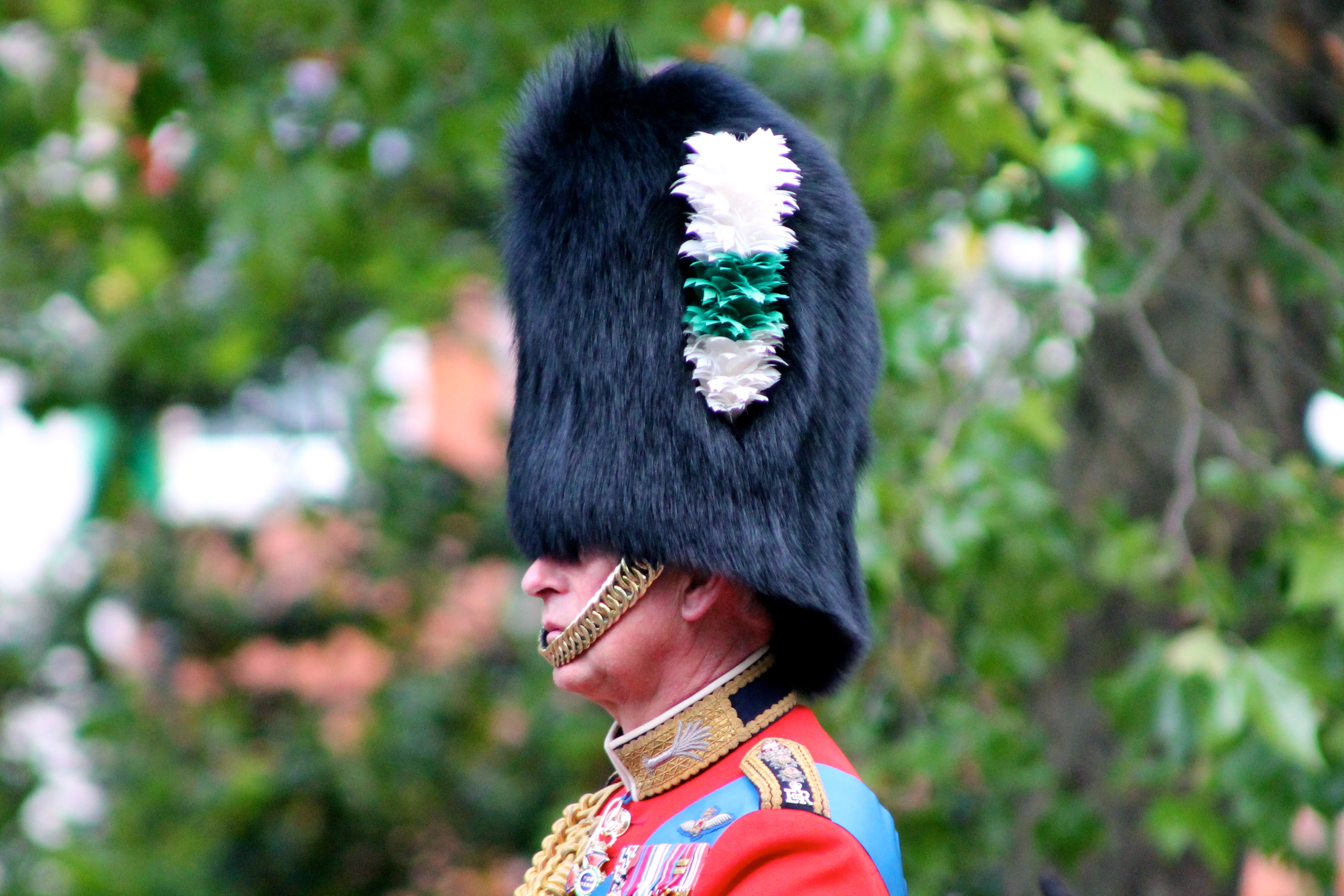
Charles as Colonel of the Welsh Guards, Trooping the Colour, 2012

- (United Kingdom) 1969–2006: Colonel-in-Chief of the Royal Regiment of Wales
- (United Kingdom) 1975–2022: Colonel, Welsh Guards
- (United Kingdom) 1977–2007: Colonel-in-Chief of the Cheshire Regiment
- (United Kingdom) 1977–1994: Colonel-in-Chief of the Gordon Highlanders
- (United Kingdom) 1977–1994: Colonel-in-Chief of the 2nd King Edward VII's Own Gurkha Rifles (The Sirmoor Rifles)
- (United Kingdom) 1977 – present: Colonel-in-Chief of the Parachute Regiment
- (United Kingdom) 1985–1992: Colonel-in-Chief of the 5th Royal Inniskilling Dragoon Guards
- (United Kingdom) 1992–2023: Colonel-in-Chief of the Royal Dragoon Guards
- (United Kingdom) 1992–2023: Colonel-in-Chief of the Army Air Corps
- (United Kingdom) 1994 – present: Colonel-in-Chief of the Royal Gurkha Rifles
- (United Kingdom) 1994–2006: Deputy Colonel-in-Chief of the Highlanders (Seaforth, Gordons and Camerons)
- (United Kingdom) 2000–2023: Royal Honorary Colonel of the Queen's Own Yeomanry
- (United Kingdom) 2003–2023: Colonel-in-Chief of the Queen's Dragoon Guards
- (United Kingdom) 2003–2006: Colonel-in-Chief of the King's Regiment
- (United Kingdom) 2003–2006: Colonel-in-Chief of the Black Watch (Royal Highland Regiment)
- (United Kingdom) 2006 – present: Royal Colonel of the Black Watch, 3rd Battalion, The Royal Regiment of Scotland
- (United Kingdom) 2006 – present: Royal Colonel of the 51st Highland, 7th Battalion, The Royal Regiment of Scotland
- (United Kingdom) 2007–2023: Colonel in Chief of the Mercian Regiment
- (United Kingdom) 2022 – present: Colonel-in-Chief of the Life Guards
- (United Kingdom) 2022 – present: Colonel-in-Chief of the Blues and Royals
- (United Kingdom) 2022 – present: Colonel-in-Chief of the Grenadier Guards
- (United Kingdom) 2022 – present: Colonel-in-Chief of the Coldstream Guards
- (United Kingdom) 2022 – present: Colonel-in-Chief of the Scots Guards
- (United Kingdom) 2022 – present: Colonel-in-Chief of the Irish Guards
- (United Kingdom) 2022 – present: Colonel-in-Chief of the Welsh Guards
- (United Kingdom) 2023 – present: Colonel-in-Chief of the Corps of Royal Engineers
- (United Kingdom) 2023 – present: Colonel-in-Chief of the Royal Scots Dragoon Guards
- (United Kingdom) 2023 – present: Colonel-in-Chief of the Royal Tank Regiment
- (United Kingdom) 2023 – present: Colonel-in-Chief of the Royal Regiment of Scotland
- (United Kingdom) 2023 – present: Captain General of the Royal Artillery
- (United Kingdom) 2023 – present: Captain General of the Honourable Artillery Company
- (United Kingdom) 2024 – present: Colonel-in-Chief of the Royal Welsh
- (United Kingdom) 1993–2023: Royal Honorary Air Commodore, RAF Valley
- (United Kingdom) 2023 – present: Royal Honorary Air Commodore, RAF Marham
- (United Kingdom) 2023 – present: Air Commodore-in-Chief, RAF Regiment
- (United Kingdom) 2006 – present: Commodore-in-Chief of Plymouth, Royal Naval Command
- (United Kingdom) 2019 – present: Commodore-in-Chief, Aircraft Carriers
- (United Kingdom) 2023 – present: Sponsor of HMS Queen Elizabeth
- (United Kingdom) 2006 – present: Honorary Commodore of His Majesty's Coastguard
- 8 September 2022 – present: Lord High Admiral of the United Kingdom
- 28 October 2022 – present: Captain General Royal Marines

== University degrees ==
See below at #Scholastic for honorary degrees.

Country	Date	University	Degree
United Kingdom	1970	University of Cambridge	Bachelor of Arts (BA)
United Kingdom	1975	University of Cambridge	Master of Arts (MA Cantab)

== Orders and decorations ==
=== Commonwealth realms ===
Appointments from Commonwealth realms
Country	Date	Appointment	Ribbon
United Kingdom	26 July 1958 – 8 September 2022	Royal Knight Companion of the Most Noble Order of the Garter	
United Kingdom	8 September 2022 – present	Sovereign of the Most Noble Order of the Garter	
United Kingdom	10 December 1974 – 8 September 2022	Great Master and First and Principal Knight Grand Cross of the Most Honourable Order of the Bath	
United Kingdom	8 September 2022 – present	Sovereign of the Most Honourable Order of the Bath	
United Kingdom	11 February 1977 – 8 September 2022	Extra Knight of the Most Ancient and Most Noble Order of the Thistle	
United Kingdom	8 September 2022 – present	Sovereign of the Most Ancient and Most Noble Order of the Thistle	
United Kingdom	20 December 1977 – 8 September 2022	Member of Her Majesty's Most Honourable Privy Council	
United Kingdom	8 September 2022 – present	Sovereign of the Most Illustrious Order of Saint Patrick	
United Kingdom	8 September 2022 – present	Sovereign of the Most Distinguished Order of Saint Michael and Saint George	
United Kingdom	8 September 2022 – present	Sovereign of the Most Excellent Order of the British Empire	
United Kingdom	8 September 2022 – present	Sovereign of the Distinguished Service Order	
United Kingdom	8 September 2022 – present	Sovereign of the Imperial Service Order	
United Kingdom	8 September 2022 – present	Sovereign of the Most Exalted Order of the Star of India	
United Kingdom	8 September 2022 – present	Sovereign of the Most Eminent Order of the Indian Empire	
United Kingdom	8 September 2022 – present	Sovereign of the Imperial Order of the Crown of India	
United Kingdom	8 September 2022 – present	Sovereign of the Order of British India	
United Kingdom	8 September 2022 – present	Sovereign of the Indian Order of Merit	
United Kingdom	8 September 2022 – present	Sovereign of the Order of Burma	
Australia	14 March 1981 – 8 September 2022	Knight of the Order of Australia	
Australia	8 September 2022 – present	Sovereign Head of the Order of Australia	
New Zealand	1983 – 8 September 2022	Extra Companion of the Queen's Service Order	
New Zealand	8 September 2022 – 3 May 2024	Sovereign Head of the Queen's Service Order	
New Zealand	3 May 2024 – present	Sovereign Head of the King's Service Order	
New Zealand	8 September 2022 – present	Sovereign of the Order of New Zealand	
New Zealand	8 September 2022 – present	Sovereign of the New Zealand Order of Merit	
Saskatchewan (Canada)	24 April 2001 – present	Honorary Member of the Saskatchewan Order of Merit	
Commonwealth of Nations	27 June 2002 – 8 September 2022	Member of the Order of Merit	
Commonwealth of Nations	8 September 2022 – present	Sovereign of the Order of Merit	
Commonwealth of Nations	8 September 2022 – present	Sovereign of the Royal Victorian Order	
Commonwealth of Nations	8 September 2022 – present	Sovereign of the Order of the Companions of Honour	
Commonwealth of Nations	8 September 2022 – present	Sovereign Head of the Most Venerable Order of the Hospital of Saint John of Jerusalem	
Papua New Guinea	3 November 2012 – 8 September 2022	Royal Chief of the Order of Logohu	
Papua New Guinea	8 September 2022 – present	Sovereign of the Order of Logohu	
Papua New Guinea	8 September 2022 – present	Sovereign of the Order of the Star of Melanesia	
Canada	18 May 2014 – 8 September 2022	Member of Her Majesty's Privy Council for Canada	
Canada	1 July 2017 – 8 September 2022	Extraordinary Companion of the Order of Canada	
Canada	8 September 2022 – present	Sovereign of the Order of Canada	
Canada	18 May 2022 – 8 September 2022	Extraordinary Commander of the Order of Military Merit	
Canada	8 September 2022 – present	Sovereign of the Order of Military Merit	
Canada	8 September 2022 – present	Sovereign of the Order of Merit of the Police Forces	
Antigua and Barbuda	8 September 2022 – present	Sovereign of the Order of the National Hero	
Antigua and Barbuda	8 September 2022 – present	Sovereign of the Order of the Nation	
Antigua and Barbuda	8 September 2022 – present	Sovereign of the Most Illustrious Order of Merit	
Antigua and Barbuda	8 September 2022 – present	Sovereign of the Order of Princely Heritage	
The Bahamas	8 September 2022 – present	Sovereign of the Order of Merit of the Bahamas	
Belize	8 September 2022 – present	Sovereign of the Order of the National Hero	
Belize	8 September 2022 – present	Sovereign of the Order of Belize	
Belize	8 September 2022 – present	Sovereign of the Order of Distinction	
Grenada	8 September 2022 – present	Sovereign of the Prestige Order of the National Hero	
Grenada	8 September 2022 – present	Sovereign of the Most Distinguished Order of the Nation (Note: The Order of the Nation is a component order of knighthood within the Order of Grenada, rather than a fully separate order.)	
Grenada	8 September 2022 – present	Sovereign of the Order of Grenada	
Saint Kitts and Nevis	8 September 2022 – present	Sovereign of the Order of the National Hero	
Saint Kitts and Nevis	8 September 2022 – present	Sovereign of the Order of St Christopher and Nevis	
Saint Lucia	8 September 2022 – present	Sovereign of the Order of Saint Lucia	
Tuvalu	8 September 2022 – present	Sovereign of the Tuvalu Order of Merit	
Solomon Islands	8 September 2022 – present	Sovereign of the Order of the Solomon Islands	
Solomon Islands	4 June 2024 – present	Star of the Solomon Islands	

=== Other Commonwealth countries ===
Appointments from other Commonwealth countries
Country	Date	Appointment	Ribbon
Malawi	16 April 1985	Grand Commander of the Order of the Lion	
Brunei	1996	Member of the Family Order of Laila Utama	
Ghana	6 November 2018	Honorary Companion of the Order of the Star of Ghana	
Barbados	30 November 2021	Honorary recipient of the Order of Freedom of Barbados	

=== Non-Commonwealth countries ===
Appointments from non-Commonwealth countries
Country	Date	Appointment	Ribbon
Finland	15 July 1969	Grand Cross of the Order of the White Rose of Finland	
Japan	5 October 1971	Grand Cordon of the Supreme Order of the Chrysanthemum	
Japan	25 June 2024	Collar of the Supreme Order of the Chrysanthemum	
Netherlands	11 April 1972	Grand Cross of the Order of the Crown	
Luxembourg	13 June 1972	Grand Cross of the Order of the Oak Crown	
Denmark	30 April 1974	Knight of the Order of the Elephant	
Kingdom of Nepal	23 February 1975	Member of the Most Glorious Order of Ojaswi Rajanya	
Sweden	23 May 1975	Knight of the Royal Order of the Seraphim	
Brazil	8 March 1978	Grand Cross of the National Order of the Southern Cross	
Norway	1 July 1978	Grand Cross with Collar of the Royal Norwegian Order of Saint Olav	
Egypt	12 August 1981	Grand Cordon of the Order of the Republic	
Netherlands	16 November 1982	Knight Grand Cross of the Order of Orange-Nassau	
France	23 October 1984	Grand Cross of the National Order of the Legion of Honour	
Bahrain	16 November 1986	Member 1st Class of the Order of Sheikh Isa bin Salman Al Khalifa	
Qatar	14 November 1986	Collar of the Order of Merit	
Spain	18 April 1986	Knight Grand Cross of the Royal and Distinguished Spanish Order of Charles III	
Saudi Arabia	24 March 1987	Member 1st Class of the King Abdul Aziz Order of Merit	
Portugal	27 April 1993	Grand Cross of the Military Order of Saint Benedict of Aviz	
Kuwait	9 November 1993	Member 1st Class of the Order of Mubarak the Great	
Hungary	3 March 2010	Grand Cross of the Order of Merit of the Republic of Hungary	
Mexico	9 September 2015	Sash of Special Category of the Mexican Order of the Aztec Eagle	
France	16 March 2017	Commander of the Order of Agricultural Merit	
Romania	29 March 2017	Grand Cross of the Order of the Star of Romania	
Armenia	19 October 2018	Recipient of the Order of Friendship	
Germany	29 March 2023	Grand Cross Special Class of the Order of Merit of the Federal Republic of Germany	
Portugal	15 June 2023	Grand Collar of the Military Order of the Tower and Sword	
South Korea	21 November 2023	Recipient of the Grand Order of Mugunghwa	
Italy	4 April 2025	Knight Grand Cross with Collar of the Order of Merit of the Italian Republic	
Holy See	23 October 2025	Knight with the Collar of the Order of Pope Pius IX	
Oman	20 October 2026	Collar of the Order of Al Said	

Decorations and medals from non-Commonwealth countries
Country	Date	Appointment	Ribbon
Kingdom of Nepal	24 February 1975	Recipient of the King Birendra Coronation Medal	
Netherlands	30 April 2013	Recipient of the King Willem-Alexander Inauguration Medal	
Qatar	3 December 2024	Recipient of the Sword of the Founder Sheikh Jassim bin Mohammed bin Thani	

== Wear of orders, decorations, and medals ==
The ribbons worn regularly by Charles in undress uniform are as follows:

Ribbons of King Charles III

Order of the Bath	Order of Merit	Order of Australia
King's Service Order	Order of Canada	Order of Military Merit
Queen Elizabeth II; Coronation Medal	Queen Elizabeth II; Silver Jubilee Medal	Queen Elizabeth II; Golden Jubilee Medal
Queen Elizabeth II; Diamond Jubilee Medal	Queen Elizabeth II; Platinum Jubilee Medal	Naval Long Service and Good Conduct Medal with four bars
Canadian Forces' Decoration with three clasps	New Zealand 1990; Commemoration Medal	New Zealand Armed Forces Award

With medals, Charles normally wears the breast stars of the Garter, Thistle, and Bath. When only one should be worn, he wears the Order of the Garter star, except in Scotland where the Scottish Order of the Thistle star is worn. Foreign honours are worn in accordance with British customs and traditions when applicable.

== Non-national titles and honours ==
=== Member and fellowships ===
Country	Date	Organisation	Position
United Kingdom (England and Wales)	1975 – present	Marylebone Cricket Club	Honorary Life Member
United Kingdom (England and Wales)	1975 – present	Honourable Society of Gray's Inn	Royal Bencher
United Kingdom (England and Wales)	1978 – present	Royal Society	Royal Fellow (FRS)
United Kingdom (England and Wales)	2000 – present	Royal Asiatic Society	Fellow (FRAS)
United Kingdom (England and Wales)		Foreign Press Association	Honorary Member
England	1988–1990	Honourable Company of Master Mariners	Master
England		Worshipful Company of Brewers	Honorary Liveryman
England		Worshipful Company of Carpenters	Honorary Liveryman
England		Worshipful Company of Drapers	Freeman
England		Worshipful Company of Farmers	Honorary Liveryman
England		Worshipful Company of Fishmongers	Liveryman
England		Worshipful Company of Fruiterers	Honorary Liveryman
England		Worshipful Company of Gardeners	Royal Liveryman
England		Worshipful Company of Goldsmiths	Honorary Member of the Court of Assistants
England		Worshipful Company of Musicians	Honorary Freeman
England		Worshipful Company of Shipwrights	Permanent Master
England		Worshipful Company of Stationers and Newspaper Makers	Honorary Freeman and Liveryman

=== Scholastic ===
==== Chancellor, visitor, governor, and fellowships ====
Country	Date	School	Position
England	1988	Trinity College, Cambridge	Honorary Fellow
England	2007	Liverpool John Moores University	Honorary Fellow
England	2020	Kellogg College, Oxford	Bynum Tudor Fellow

==== Honorary degrees ====
Country	Date	School	Degree
England	1981	Royal College of Music	Doctor of Music (DMus)
New Zealand	1981	University of Otago	Doctor of Literature (LittD)
Canada	1983	University of Alberta	Doctor of Laws (LLD)
Italy	1987	University of Bologna	Doctor of Literature and Philosophy (DLitt et Phil)
Canada	1991	Queen's University at Kingston	Doctor of Laws (LLD)
England	1998	University of Durham	Doctor of Civil Law (DCL)
Scotland	2001	University of Glasgow	Doctor of Laws (LLD)
England	2007	University of Chester	Doctor of Letters (DLitt)
Scotland	2004	Royal Scottish Academy of Music and Drama	Doctor of the Academy
India	2013	Forest Research Institute	Doctor of Science (DSc)
Romania	31 May 2014	University of Bucharest	Doctorate
Romania	29 May 2017	Babeș-Bolyai University	Doctorate

=== Religious ===
Country	Date	Institution	Position
Holy See	2025	Papal Basilica and Abbey of Saint Paul Outside the Walls	Royal Confrater

=== Dynastic orders ===
Appointer	Date	Appointment
Kīngitanga	2023	Member Supreme Class of the Order of King Pootatau Te Wherowhero

== Freedom of the city ==
- (Wales) 5 July 1969: Cardiff
- (England) 1970: Royal Borough of Windsor and Maidenhead
- (England) 1971: London
- (Alberta) 1977: Calgary
- (England) 3 April 1979: Portsmouth
- (England) 8 June 1989: Northampton
- (Wales) 24 May 1994: Swansea
- (England) 24 October 2002: Ripon

=== Foreign ===
- (Spain) 2011: Madrid
- (Greece) 2021: Athens

== Honorific eponyms ==
=== Academic ===
- King Charles III Professorship – Trinity College, Cambridge

=== Geographic locations ===
- (Australia) Australian Antarctic Territory: Prince Charles Mountains
- British Antarctic Territory: Prince Charles Strait
- (New Zealand) Ross Dependency: Prince of Wales Glacier
- (United Kingdom) : King Charles III England Coast Path

=== Structures ===
==== Buildings ====
- Fiji: Prince Charles Park, Nadi
- Hong Kong: Prince of Wales Hospital, Sha Tin
- Queensland: The Prince Charles Hospital, Brisbane
- United Kingdom: Prince Charles House, Cornwall
- United Kingdom: The King Charles III Sacristy, Westminster Abbey, London
- United Kingdom: Prince Charles Cinema, Chinatown, London

===== Former =====
- British Hong Kong: Prince of Wales Building, Admiralty (renamed in 1997)

=== Awards ===
- Canada: Prince of Wales Prize for Municipal Heritage Leadership
- Australia: King Charles III Stakes, Randwick Racecourse
- United Kingdom: King Charles III Stakes, Ascot Racecourse

=== Species ===
- Ecuador: Hyloscirtus princecharlesi, or the Prince Charles Stream Tree Frog

=== Miscellaneous ===
- Rosa 'The King's Rose'

== See also ==
- Style of the British sovereign
- Title and style of the Canadian monarch
- List of titles and honours of Queen Camilla
- List of titles and honours of William, Prince of Wales
- List of titles and honours of Catherine, Princess of Wales
- List of titles and honours of Elizabeth II
- List of titles and honours of Prince Philip, Duke of Edinburgh
- List of titles and honours of Anne, Princess Royal
- List of titles and honours of Prince Edward, Duke of Edinburgh
- List of titles and honours of George VI
- List of titles and honours of Queen Elizabeth the Queen Mother
- List of titles and honours of George V
- List of titles and honours of Mary of Teck
- List of titles and honours of Edward VIII
- List of titles and honours of Prince Arthur, Duke of Connaught and Strathearn
