= Gwendolyn Tonge =

Antiguan teacher and home economics expert

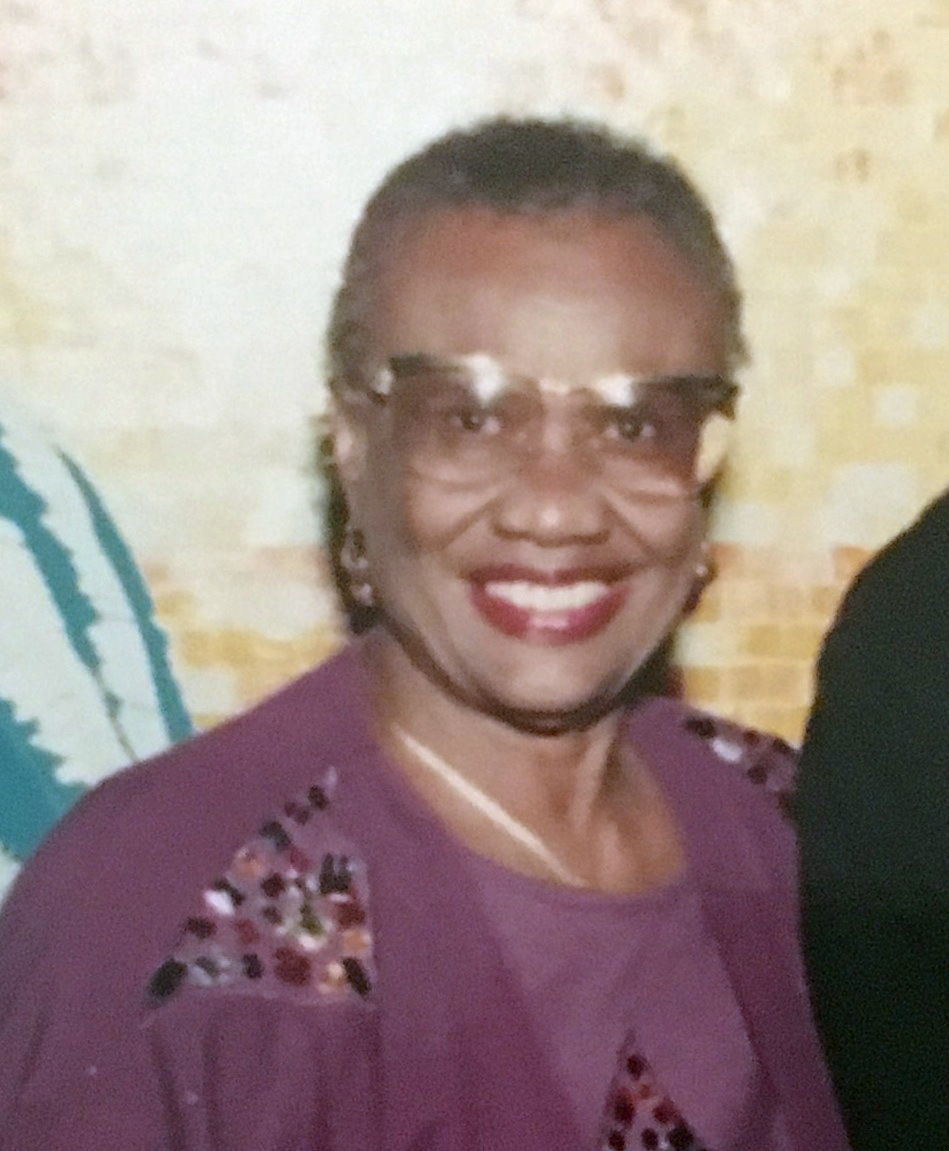
- Born: Gwendolyn Moreen Peters; 3 October 1923; Seatons Village, Antigua and Barbuda
- Died: 28 September 2012 (aged 88); St. John's, Antigua and Barbuda
- Other names: Gwen Tonge, "Auntie" Gwen, Gwendolyn Moreen Tonge

Dame Gwendolyn Tonge, DCN, OH, MBE (3 October 1923 – 28 September 2012) was an Antiguan teacher and home economics expert. After teaching for many years, she became the head of the government Women's Desk, the precursor to the Directorate of Gender Affairs. Appointed as a Senator, she continued to work in the Ministry of the Prime Minister, responsible for policies on women's issues. As Auntie Gwen, she hosted a cooking show Cooking Magic, which began airing on the Antigua and Barbuda Broadcasting Service (ABS) in the 1960s until her death, the longest running television series in the eastern Caribbean, other than news programs. The recipient of many awards, she was honored with the Order of the British Empire, the Order of Honour of Antigua and Barbuda, Distinguished Order of the Nation.

== Early life ==
Gwendolyn Moreen Peters was born on 3 October 1923 in Seatons Village, on the Island of Antigua in the Eastern Caribbean nation of Antigua and Barbuda. She attended her basic educational studies in Antigua and trained under Caribbean pupil-teacher program to enable her to become a teacher. She went on to study pedagogy at the Housecraft Centre in Barbados and took further studies at the University of Puerto Rico.

== Career ==
Returning to Antigua, Peters worked at the Green Bay Government School in Saint John Parish, teaching domestic science. In 1952, the Caribbean Conference of Home Economics was held in Port of Spain, Trinidad, prompting the Antiguan government to create a training program focused on home economics. Peters was placed in charge of the program as its first supervisor. She developed a three-year certification program for primary and secondary schools. Hearing about a program the Macdonald Institute which later became part of the University of Guelph, she applied to further her studies in Canada. Her scholarship application to Canada was denied by the government, but they approved her to attend classes at Cornell University. She traveled to New York and began classes. After intervention from Madconald's principal, Margaret McCready, Peters was transferred to Macdonald and graduated with a degree in home economics in 1959.

Peters married Edgar T. Tonge, who would become the Assistant Superintendent of Police and they had six children: Euline, Eustace, Hesketh, Erna-Mae, Roger and Edgar. In 1964, she began hosting a television show, Cooking Magic on the Antigua and Barbuda Broadcasting Service (ABS). The program was aimed to give emphasis to nutrition on a budget and featured traditional, regional recipes using locally grown ingredients. Airing on Tuesdays and Wednesdays, the program was carried throughout the Caribbean and by affiliated stations in Louisiana and New York. Initially, it was filmed in a studio, but later, was filmed in Tonge's home with the lights taped to her ceilings. The show inspired her to publish two cookbooks, Cooking Antigua's Foods (1973) and Cooking Magic, which was reprinted and revised in 1992.

Tonge became one of the founding members of the Caribbean Association of Home Economists (CAHE) at its creation in 1972 and was elected as vice president of the organization in 1975. She became the second president of the organization, serving from 1977 to 1981 and then acted as a consultant to the association until 1989. In 1978, she was honored as a Member of the Order of the British Empire for educational work in home economics. Instrumental in creating the constitution of CAHE, she was also the driving force behind the development of the organization's magazine, The Home Economist, which began publication in 1979. She was involved in the publication and co-authorship of three volumes of textbooks, Caribbean Home Economics in Action Books, which are still widely used in the region to teach domestic science and endowed a scholarship in her name in 1981, which is awarded to CAHE members wishing to further their education. She also founded the Antigua and Barbuda Partners of the Americas, to foster intercultural exchanges and volunteerism. Between 1981 and 1983 forty-one exchanges, featuring workshops and volunteer opportunities for tourists, took place between Antigua and the city of Rochester, New York.

In 1980, Tonge was appointed to run the Women's Desk, a precursor to the Directorate of Gender Affairs of the government. In 1994, she was appointed as a Senator, serving as the Parliamentary Secretary of Women's Affairs. She served in that capacity until 1999, when she was appointed as Commissioner for Gender Affairs, Child Welfare, Single Parents and Care for the Elderly in the Ministry of the Prime Minister. Tonge held the post until 2001, which was responsible for addressing policies effecting women, including those dealing with domestic violence, economic security, education, health, and other issues. She simultaneously served as the delegate for Antigua and Barbuda to the Inter-American Commission of Women, and was awarded the Order of Honour of Antigua and Barbuda for her work with women. Tonge was designated as a Dame Commander in the Distinguished Order of the Nation of Antigua and Barbuda, in November 2006. The Antigua Hotel and Tourist Association named the highest prize in their Magic Mango Menu competition in Tonge's honor in 2008.

== Death and legacy ==
Tonge died on 28 September 2012 at her home in the Campsite neighborhood of St. John's, Antigua. She was given a state funeral and was buried in the St. John's Public Cemetery. Posthumously, the Government of Antigua and Barbuda, created the Dame Gwendolyn Tonge Scholarship to be awarded every three years, in Tonge's honor to a student of gender studies. Her television show, Cooking Magic still appears on air with her daughter, Erna Mae, and son, Hesketh, producing the program. In 2013, she was honored by the Institute for Gender and Development Studies of the St. Augustine campus of the University of the West Indies for her contributions to women's development in the Caribbean.
