= History of Antigua and Barbuda (1688–1832) =

Antigua
- 1688–1832
- Demonyms: Antiguan; Barbudan
- History
  - Established: 1688
  - Disestablished: 1832
- Today part of: Antigua and Barbuda

This article covers the history of Antigua and Barbuda from 1688 until the prelude to emancipation in 1832. During this era, the parishes and government were properly established, as well as the height of slavery and the establishment of an Antiguan sugar-based economy. Antigua was often formally called the Colony of Antigua during this period. Barbuda was under the near-complete control of the Codringtons, and was not yet united with Antigua.

== Early slavery and Prince Klaas (1688–1740) ==
After the short tenure of Nathaniel Johnson, Colonel Christopher Codrington assumed control of the Antiguan government in 1689. In 1692, the Antiguan government began to focus on the colony's internal affairs, dividing it into the present-day parishes. However, by 1693, the Antiguan government once again directed its focus to exterminating the Kalinago. In 1698, Codrington died, and John Yeamans took the governorship. Also in this year, Antigua appointed its first agent to London. The position was abolished in 1800.

In 1700, the legislature became focused on increasing the amount of white people who moved to Antigua. Soldiers that had recently been disbanded were also encouraged to settle in Antigua. In 1702, the island's first market was established, and the first town wardens were elected in St. John's (now a city). All free black people who did not own land were also forced to choose a master. The island militia was also established, and all white men aged fourteen to sixty-five were required to train once a month. A grand rendezvous was held annually, where the people who could fire six shots the most accurately would be granted a prize.

In 1706, the disgraced Daniel Parke arrived in Antigua. One of the first unpopular actions he took was to make a low man a member of the assembly. These unpopular decisions continued until 1710, when Parke was killed on 7 December. In 1725, the parish of Saint George was established, due to Saint Peter being deemed to large to provide essential services. With the death of George I in 1727, Lord Londonderry was appointed as the new governor of Antigua in 1728. This year, a small conspiracy of the slaves owned by Crump was discovered, however none of those involved were executed, and were instead banished or sold off. A proposal for a government house was also made, as the current one was a rental home, however, this idea did not come into fruition until 1800.

In 1731, Antigua was hit by a drought, with a pail of water sometimes being priced at three shillings. In 1732, a court of chancery was established, being composed of the captain-general or governor, at least five members of the island's legislature, and in the future, the lieutenant-governor if the governor-in-chief was absent. In 1736, the Kingdom of Antigua plot was uncovered, led by Prince Klaas, "king" of the Afro-Antiguans. After this, slaves lost any sort of freedom of assembly in St. John's, and due to fear of another rebellion, the administration frantically tried to increase the amount of white settlers.

== Conflicts of the 1700s (1741–1799) ==
With the start of various conflicts, Antigua's economy suffered heavily. Barracks were built on Rat Island, and by 1753 there was a guard-house for a regiment stationed in St. John's, and by 1757 artillery was stationed there. In 1758, Antigua was threatened with French invasion, thus, in 1759, Captain Tyrrel was ordered to protect Antigua. He discovered a large enemy fleet, and in an intense fight, lost three fingers and suffered a facial injury. In 1760, Methodism was introduced to Antigua.

In 1772, St. John's Harbour and English Harbour were severely damaged by hurricanes, and for the next few years, Antigua was spared from any military conflict. However, due to nearly all the islands surrounding Antigua being involved in intense warfare, a famine killed about 8,000 slaves by 1780. This is also around the time when Lord Rodney, a well-respected admiral, took control of Antigua's fleet. In 1776, the Spanish ship Sancta Rita wrecked in Barbuda, causing some controversy. During the governorship of General Burt, Goat Hill, Barnacle Point, and Great George Fort were fortified. It is said that Burt may have been poisoned in 1781. In 1784, churchwardens were encouraged to sell lands to establish parish hospitals, and in 1787, Prince William Henry visited the island. In 1788, slaves were granted the yearly right to a short Christmas break that was to last from Christmas Eve until sunrise on 28 December. However, during these days, martial law was in force. Later in 1788, a Jew named "Marcus" was sentenced to death (although later pardoned) for the robbery of another person in his community along with "Vanban". When Vanban was sentenced to stand in the pillory, he is said to have held an umbrella to avoid the sun from hitting his face.

In 1790, the vestry of Saint John was granted the right to levy taxes, to be used to assist the poor, the ministers, and other public services. In 1791, free black people were granted the right to open rum-shops, and a law containing 227 clauses was adopted to reform the judiciary of Antigua. Fortifications also commenced at Dow's Hill. In 1792, Antigua once again attempted to increase the amount of white people, however, this was not successful. Due to Antigua's large amount of creeks and harbours, French and Carib incursions were quite frequent, although due to it being naturally fortified by large rocks, full-scale invasions remained rare. In 1793, Antigua's militia was regulated, being composed of "one squadron of light dragoons, two regiments and one independent company of foot, and one battalion of artillery." Black people were also for the first time allowed to serve in minor roles in the militia, such as under services of the artillery.

In 1794, Antigua was involved in the invasion of Guadeloupe and Martinique. This occurred during the brief governorship of Charles Leigh, which, after his departure, resulted in the governor of St. Kitts claiming the Leeward Islands governorship, St. Kitts continued to attempt to take control of the Leeward Islands for the next few years.

== Prelude to emancipation (1800–1832) ==
In 1800, a census was conducted, with the number of black people on the island being 37,000. In the early 1800s, Antigua was still recovering from the conflict with France. It was also decided that year that if anyone killed a slave, they would be charged with murder. In defiance to the king, the governor at the time, John Thomas, refused to make Antigua the centre of the Leeward Islands administration, preferring St. Kitts. Due to another conflict, Antigua was put into a state of defence in the early 1800s, and in 1805, a French squadron nearly landed in Antigua before deciding to attack Nevis instead.

On 22 January 1807, effective 1 March 1808, the slave trade was abolished. In 1813, a five-man police force was established, one of whom was a clerk who attended sittings of the magistrates. In 1816, the British Leeward Islands were abolished, and George W. Ramsay became the governor of Antigua-Barbuda-Montserrat.

=== Antigua-Barbuda-Montserrat (1816-1833) ===
After the death of Ramsay in 1819, Sir Benjamin D'Urban arrived in Antigua in 1820 to serve as the next governor. A census was taken, determining that Antigua had a population of 37,031 (4,066 colored, 1,980 white, 30,985 black). The population of Barbuda was 503. A 945-man militia was also raised. D'Urban was recalled in 1826, and Sir Patrick Ross became the next governor. In 1828, "dandy fever" prevailed, and in 1831, there was an insurrection among the black people who did not want to work on Sundays. In 1833, the Leeward Islands were reinstated, with the addition of Dominica.
