= George Ryan (disambiguation) =

George Ryan (1934–2025) was an American politician, governor of Illinois (1999–2003).

George Ryan may also refer to:

- George Ryan (Irish-Danish businessman) (1783 or 1785 –1865), Danish businessman and plantation owner
- George Ryan (Canadian politician) (1806–1876), member of the Canadian House of Commons
- Sir George Ryan (Antiguan businessman) (born 1934), Antiguan businessperson
