= George Ryan (Antiguan businessman) =

Montserrat-born Antiguan contractor, businessman and philanthropist

Sir George Ryan KGCN GCM
- Born: June 18th 1934; Plymouth, Montserrat
- Occupations: Contractor, businessman, philanthropist
- Spouse: Lady N. Joycelyn Ryan (1991 - present)

Sir George Ryan KGCN GCM (born June 18, 1934) is a Montserrat-born Antiguan contractor, businessman and philanthropist based in Antigua and Barbuda.

== Early life and career ==
Ryan was born in Plymouth, Montserrat, in 1934 to a single mother, Mary Whyke. His father, Abraham Ryan, was a tailor but did not contribute significantly to his life. In the 1950s, he moved to Antigua to work with Reverend Jack Piper as his mother worked as a housemaid in Piper's household. With Mr Piper, he began work as a mason's apprentice to assist in building the St. John's Pentecostal Church in Antigua. After working on the church, he later apprenticed at many local Antiguan construction companies before founding Ryan's Construction in 1965. He went on to establish Antigua Plumbing and Hardware Centre Ltd. and Antigua Motors 1974 Ltd., City View Hotel, Antigua Home and Garden Centre, and Ryan’s Place. By 2006, his business holdings had expanded to the point where he was named one of the twelve largest investors in Antigua by sales volume.

He is also an active philanthropist, donating to the state, the arts, and those in need. He was involved in several government-commissioned projects throughout the 70s and 80s such as building stands first ever test match at the Antigua Recreation Ground, refurbishing the St. John’s Police Station, donating the first set of police motor vehicles to the state, as well as major renovation and construction at the Antigua State College for a period of 15 years.

== Personal life ==
Ryan has seven children, including George-Ann Ryan (former Chief Financial Officer of the Sadie Collective and now working within the Ryan Group of Companies) and Paul Ryan who is The First Indonesian Honorary Consul to Antigua and Barbuda and General Manager of Antigua Motors. He has been married to Lady N. Joycelyn Ryan since 1991.

== Awards and honors ==
In 2005, Ryan was awarded the Grand Cross (GCM) in the Most Illustrious Order of Merit. In 2018, he was awarded the honor of Knight Commander of the Most Distinguished Order of the Nation (KCN), Antigua's highest award of distinction second only to National Hero status, for contributions to the business landscape and economic development in celebration of the island's 37th anniversary of independence.
