= GCH =

GCH may refer to:

- Gachsaran Airport, in Iran
- Garelochhead railway station, in Scotland
- Generalized continuum hypothesis, in mathematical set theory
- Gold Coast University Hospital, in Australia
- Grand Cross of the Order of Princely Heritage
- Grey Coat Hospital, a secondary school in London
- GTP cyclohydrolase I, an enzyme
- Gym Class Heroes, an American band
- Knight Grand Cross of the Royal Guelphic Order

gch can be:

- The file extension for a precompiled header file by gcc
