= Order of the National Hero (Antigua and Barbuda) =

Antiguan and Barbudan order of chivalry

Most Exalted Order of the National Hero
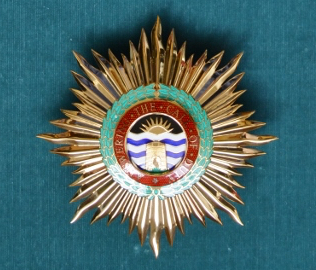
- Star of a Knight or Dame Companion

Awarded by Governor-General of Antigua and Barbuda
- Type: Order of chivalry
- Motto: Answering the Call of Duty
- Eligibility: Citizens of Antigua and Barbuda
- Awarded for: Pre-eminently distinguished service to Antigua and Barbuda or to humanity at large
- Status: Currently constituted
- Chancellor: Governor-General of Antigua and Barbuda
- Grades: Knight/Dame Companion (KNH/DNH)

Precedence
- Next (higher): None
- Next (lower): Order of the Nation
- Ribbon of the Order of the National Hero

The Most Exalted Order of the National Hero is an Antiguan and Barbudan order of chivalry recognising pre-eminently distinguished service to Antigua and Barbuda or to humanity at large. The present Order was established and constituted by the Parliament of Antigua and Barbuda under the National Honours Act 1998. which received Royal Assent from the Governor-General of Antigua and Barbuda on 31 December 1998.

== History ==
The Order of the National Hero was first established and constituted by the Parliament of Antigua and Barbuda under the National Heroes Act 1994. This Act was repealed and the Order was re-established and re-constituted under the National Honours Act 1998, which was amended in 2000, 2001 and 2015. Persons who were members of the Order before the 1998 Act came into force became Knights or Dames Companion of Order.

== Composition ==
The Order is composed of the Chancellor and one single class of Knights Companion (KNH) or Dames Companion (DNH).

The Governor-General of Antigua and Barbuda is ex officio Chancellor of the Order. Membership is open to only citizens of Antigua and Barbuda and there may be no more than three living members at any one time.

=== Officers ===
The Order has four officers who compose the Chancery of the Order, as follows:

- Chancellor
- Secretary General
- Antigua Herald
- Barbuda Herald

== Appointments ==
Appointments to the Order are made by the Chancellor on the advice of the Prime Minister of Antigua and Barbuda and the Honours Committee established under the 1998 Act. The Honours Committee consists of a person appointed by the Governor-General of Antigua and Barbuda, two Members of the Senate of Antigua and Barbuda and four Members of the House of Representatives of Antigua and Barbuda. The Governor-General appoints the Chairperson of the Honours Committee from amongst its members.

Posthumous appointments to the Order may be made, but a deceased recipient does not appear on the current list of members of the Order.

New appointments are announced on the occasion of the Independence Day of Antigua and Barbuda (1 November). The Grand Master conducts investitures at Government House in St John's.

== Precedence and privileges ==
=== Titles ===
In Antigua and Barbuda, Knights Companion of the Order may use the title "Sir" in front of their forename, and their wives may use the courtesy title "Lady" in front of their husband's surname. Similarly, Dames Companion of the Order may use the title "Dame" in front of their forename (no privilege exists for their husbands).

Permission to use these titles outside Antigua and Barbuda is the prerogative of each relevant jurisdiction. For instance, British citizens, including dual citizens, who are Knights and Dames of non-British orders of chivalry may not as a matter of official policy use their titles in the United Kingdom.

=== Post-nominals and precedence ===
Members of the Order are entitled to place post-nominals after their names as indicated above. They are also assigned a place in the order of precedence of Antigua and Barbuda.

=== Heraldic privileges ===
Knights and Dames Companion may petition for heraldic supporters to be granted to their arms. They may also encircle their arms with a circlet bearing the motto of the Order and the pendent insignia of the Order may be shown below the arms.

== List of knights and dames companion ==
Number	Name	Life	Year appointed	Notes
1	Sir Vere Cornwall Bird Sr	1910–1999	1994	
2	King Court Tackey (Prince Klaas)	c1694–1736	2000 (posthumous)	
3	Dame Georgiana Ellen (Nellie) Robinson	1880–1972	2006 (posthumous)	
4	Sir Isaac Vivian Alexander Richards	1952–	2006	
5	Sir George Herbert Walter	1928–2008	2008 (posthumous)	
6	Sir Lester Bryant Bird	1938–2021	2014	

== See also ==
- Order of the Nation (Antigua and Barbuda)
- Order of Merit (Antigua and Barbuda)
- Order of Princely Heritage
- List of post-nominals (Antigua and Barbuda)
- Order and decorations of Commonwealth realms
