= List of post-nominal letters (Antigua and Barbuda) =

Post-nominal letters in Antigua and Barbuda include:

Office	Post-nominal
The Most Exalted Order of the National Hero
Knight of the Order of the National Hero	KNH
Dame of the Order of the National Hero	DNH
The Most Distinguished Order of the Nation
Knight Grand Collar	KGN
Dame Grand Collar	DGN
Knight Grand Cross	KGCN
Dame Grand Cross	DCGN
Knight Commander	KCN
Dame Commander	DCN
Commander	CN
Officer	ON
Member	MN
The Most Illustrious Order of Merit
Grand Cross	GCM
Grand Officer	GOM
Commander	CM
Officer	OM
Member	MM
The Most Precious Order of Princely Heritage
Grand Cross	GCH
Grand Officer	GOH
Commander	CH
Officer	OH
Member	MH

== See also ==
- Lists of post-nominal letters
