= Order of Princely Heritage =

Most Precious Order of Princely Heritage
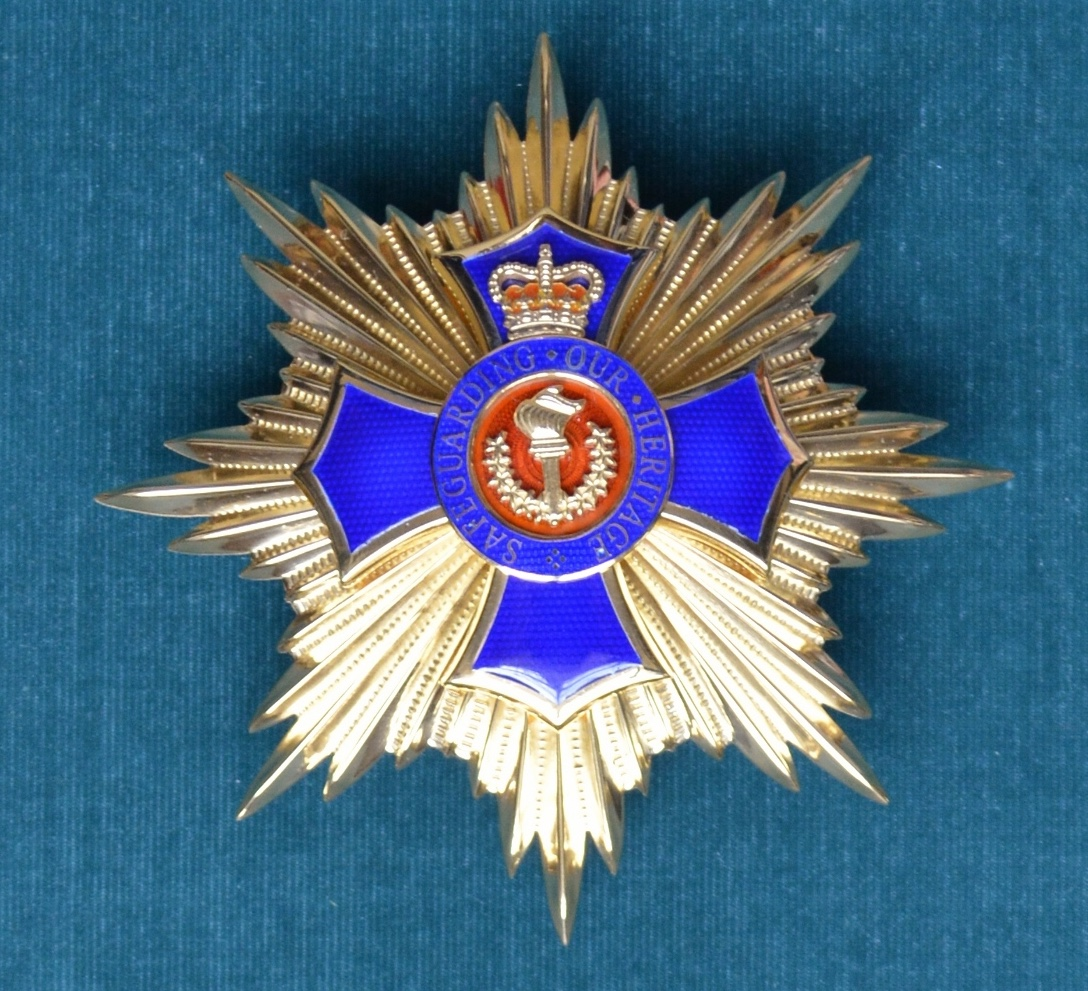
- Star of a Grand Cross

Awarded by Governor-General of Antigua and Barbuda
- Type: National order
- Motto: Safeguarding Our Heritage
- Eligibility: Citizens of Antigua and Barbuda and citizens of other countries
- Awarded for: Invaluable service to Antigua and Barbuda, the Caricom region or to the international community in any field of heritage and other cultural endeavours
- Status: Currently constituted
- Chancellor: Governor-General of Antigua and Barbuda
- Grades: Grand Cross (GCH); Grand Officer (GOH); Commander (CH); Officer (OH); Member (MH)

Precedence
- Next (higher): Order of Merit
- Next (lower): None
- Ribbon of the Order of Princely Heritage

The Most Precious Order of Princely Heritage is an order of merit of Antigua and Barbuda recognising invaluable service to Antigua and Barbuda, the CARICOM region or the international community in any field of heritage and other cultural endeavours. It was established and constituted by the Parliament of Antigua and Barbuda under the National Honours Act 1998. which received royal assent from the Governor-General of Antigua and Barbuda on 31 December 1998.

== History ==
The Order of Princely Heritage was established and constituted under the National Honours Act 1998, which was amended in 2000, 2001 and 2015.

== Composition ==
The Order is composed of the Chancellor and five classes of members, in descending order of precedence, as follows:

1. Grand Cross (GCH)
2. Grand Officer (GOH)
3. Commander (CH)
4. Officer (OH)
5. Member (MH)

The Governor-General of Antigua and Barbuda is ex officio Chancellor of the Order. Membership is open to citizens of Antigua and Barbuda and citizens of other countries.

=== Officers ===
The Order has four officers who compose the Chancery of the Order, as follows:

- Chancellor
- Secretary General
- Antigua Herald
- Barbuda Herald

== Appointments ==
Appointments to the Order are made by the Chancellor on the advice of the Prime Minister of Antigua and Barbuda and the Honours Committee established under the 1998 Act. The Honours Committee consists of a person appointed by the Governor-General of Antigua and Barbuda, two Members of the Senate of Antigua and Barbuda and four Members of the House of Representatives of Antigua and Barbuda. The Governor-General appoints the Chairperson of the Honours Committee from amongst its members.

Posthumous appointments to the Order may be made, but a deceased recipient does not appear on the current list of members of the Order.

New appointments are announced each year on the occasion of the Independence Day of Antigua and Barbuda (1 November). The Chancellor conducts investitures at Government House in St. John's.

== Precedence and privileges ==
Members of the order are assigned a place in the order of precedence of Antigua and Barbuda. Members are also entitled to place post-nominals after their names indicating the appropriate class of the order to which they have been appointed.

Grand Crosses may petition for heraldic supporters to be granted to their arms. They may also encircle their arms with a circlet bearing the motto of the Order. Grand Officers and Commanders may encircle their arms with the circlet. The pendent insignia of the Order may be shown below the arms of all members of the Order.

== Notable recipients ==
- Maurice Hope, GCH
- Claudette Peters, OH

== See also ==
- Order of the National Hero (Antigua and Barbuda)
- Order of the Nation (Antigua and Barbuda)
- List of post-nominal letters (Antigua and Barbuda)
- Orders and decorations of the Commonwealth realms
