= Order of Merit (Antigua and Barbuda) =

Most Illustrious Order of Merit
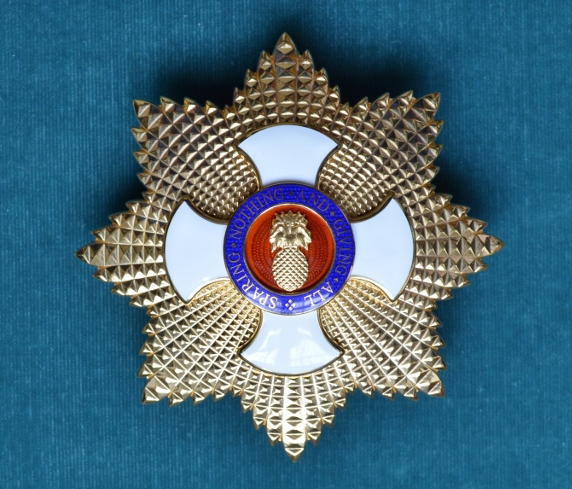
- Star of a Grand Cross

Awarded by Governor-General of Antigua and Barbuda
- Type: National order
- Motto: Sparing Nothing and Giving All
- Eligibility: Citizens of Antigua and Barbuda and citizens of other countries
- Awarded for: Meritorious service to Antigua and Barbuda, the Caricom region or to the international community.
- Status: Currently constituted
- Chancellor: Governor-General of Antigua and Barbuda
- Grades: Grand Cross (GCM); Grand Officer (GOM); Commander (CM); Officer (OM); Member (MM)

Precedence
- Next (higher): Order of the Nation
- Next (lower): Order of Princely Heritage
- Ribbon of the Order of Merit

The Most Illustrious Order of Merit is an Antiguan and Barbudan order of merit recognising meritorious service to Antigua and Barbuda, the Caricom region or the international community. It was established and constituted by the Parliament of Antigua and Barbuda under the National Honours Act 1998. which received Royal Assent from the Governor-General of Antigua and Barbuda on 31 December 1998.

== History ==
The predecessors of the Order of Merit were the Order of Distinction and the Order of Honour established and constituted by the Parliament of Antigua and Barbuda under the National Awards Act 1987. This Act was repealed and the Order of Merit was established and constituted under the National Honours Act 1998, which was amended in 2000, 2001 and 2015. Persons who were members of the Order of Distinction and the Order of Honour before the 1998 Act came into force became respectively Grand Crosses and Members of the Order of Merit.

== Composition ==
The Order is composed of the Chancellor and five classes of members, in descending order of precedence, as follows:

1. Grand Cross (GCM)
2. Grand Officer (GOM)
3. Commander (CM)
4. Officer (OM)
5. Member (MM)

The Governor-General of Antigua and Barbuda is ex officio Chancellor of the Order. Membership is open to citizens of Antigua and Barbuda and citizens of other countries.

=== Officers ===
The Order has four officers who compose the Chancery of the Order, as follows:

- Chancellor
- Secretary General
- Antigua Herald
- Barbuda Herald

== Appointments ==
Appointments to the Order are made by the Chancellor on the advice of the Prime Minister of Antigua and Barbuda and the Honours Committee established under the 1998 Act. The Honours Committee consists of a person appointed by the Governor-General of Antigua and Barbuda, two Members of the Senate of Antigua and Barbuda and four Members of the House of Representatives of Antigua and Barbuda. The Governor-General appoints the Chairperson of the Honours Committee from amongst its members.

Posthumous appointments to the Order may be made, but a deceased recipient does not appear on the current list of members of the Order.

New appointments are announced each year on the occasion of the Independence Day of Antigua and Barbuda (1 November). The Grand Master conducts investitures at Government House in St. John's.

== Precedence and privileges ==
=== Post-nominals and precedence ===
Members of the Order are entitled to place post-nominals after their names as indicated above. They are also assigned a place in the order of precedence of Antigua and Barbuda.

=== Heraldic privileges ===
Grand Crosses may petition for heraldic supporters to be granted to their arms. They may also encircle their arms with a circlet bearing the motto of the Order. Grand Officers and Commanders may encircle their arms with the circlet. The pendent insignia of the Order may be shown below the arms of all members of the Order.

== See also ==
- Order of the National Hero (Antigua and Barbuda)
- Order of the Nation (Antigua and Barbuda)
- Order of Princely Heritage
- List of post-nominals (Antigua and Barbuda)
- Order and decorations of the Commonwealth realms
