= Prince Klaas =

King of the Afro-Antiguans

Prince Klaas KNH
- Born: Kwaku c. 1694
- Died: Early November 1736 (celebrated on October 22nd); Antigua
- Monuments: Prince Klaas Statue
- Other names: King Court, King Tackey
- Known for: Plot to overthrow the white colonizers in Antigua
- Honours: Most Exalted Order of the National Hero, posthumously in 2000

Prince Klaas (Note: Also known as King Court, Tackey, or by his African name, Kwaku.) was an enslaved Antiguan who was a posthumous recipient of the Most Exalted Order of the National Hero. In order to establish an independent African-ruled Kingdom of Antigua and destroy the colonial white administration, Klaas launched a slave uprising that was put down.

In 1736, he planned an uprising in which all whites on the island would be massacred. Court was crowned "King of the Coromantees" in a pasture outside the capital of St. John's, in what white observers thought was a colourful spectacle, but was actually a ritual declaration of war. Due to information from an enslaved whistleblower, colonists discovered and suppressed the plot. Prince Klaas and four accomplices were caught and executed by the breaking wheel. They hung and starved six Africans and burnt another 58 at the stake. The site of these executions is now the Antigua Recreation Ground.

== Early life ==
Klaas, then known as Kwaku, was taken captive from the Ashante in the Gold Coast (modern-day Ghana), when he was 10 years old. He was taken prisoner during the Eguafo Civil War, which broke out as a result of the death of King Takyi Kuma. This gave British and Danish slave dealers the opportunity to seize as many people as they could and sell them as slaves. Kwaku lived in St. John's and was the "chief slave", owned by Thomas Kerby, a judge of the peace and legislative assembly speaker.

== Kingdom of Antigua plot ==
Klaas was installed as king of the black Antiguans during an Akan ritual at one of the planning sessions. Although this was regarded by the white Antiguan slave owners as an "innocent ceremony," according to the group's traditions, it was a declaration of war.

In the original 1728 design for the Kingdom of Antigua, all white Antiguans were to be put to death. The plan's preparation took eight years, and was ready to be carried out in 1736. Both new arrivals and Antiguan Creole slaves took part in the conspiracy.

A 10-gallon barrel of gunpowder would be smuggled into a venue and blown up during a large ball honoring King George II in late October 1736 with the intention of killing every European there. The explosion's noise would serve as a warning signal for the allied slaves to attack every white person they saw, sparking a carnage that would make Prince Klaas the new ruler of Antigua. Under the proposal, 10 significant plantations were included. If successful, Antigua would have been the first nation in the Western Hemisphere to be governed by the African race.

== Execution and legacy ==
Statue of Klaas in St. John's

On the report of an unnamed slave, Klaas was found guilty of participating in the scheme along with 132 other individuals. The remaining 88 persons who were executed were either gibbeted (6 of them), burned at the stake, or broken on the wheel, including Klaas (77 of them). He was 45 when he was executed.

Both a statue of Prince Klaas and an exhibition in the nearby Museum of Antigua and Barbuda are currently present in St. John's. The Most Exalted Order of the National Hero, Antigua and Barbuda's highest honor, was posthumously given to Klaas in 2000.
