= Public holidays in Antigua and Barbuda =

Public holidays in Antigua and Barbuda have both fixed and variable dates.

== Holidays ==
Date	English Name	Remarks
1 January	New Year's Day	If 1 January is a Sunday, then Monday, 2 January is a public holiday
Two days before Easter	Good Friday	
One day after Easter	Easter Monday	
First Monday in May	Labour Day	Marked by singing, dance, and free transportation to areas where celebrations occur.
50 days after Easter	Whit Monday	
First Monday in August	Carnival Monday	
First Tuesday in August	Carnival Tuesday	
Second Thursday in September	National Day of Prayer	
1 November	Independence Day	Celebrated on the following Monday if 1 November is a Saturday or Sunday. Frequently associated with a parade, distribution of awards and a national food fair.
9 December	National Heroes' Day	Sometimes called National Heroes' Day. Marked by speeches and family gatherings.
25 December	Christmas Day	If 25 December falls on a Saturday or Sunday, then 27 December (which is then a Monday or a Tuesday) is a public holiday.
26 December	Boxing Day	

== Variable dates ==
- 2020
  - Easter – April 12
  - Labour Day – May 4
  - Whit Monday – June 1
  - August Monday – August 3
- 2021
  - Easter – April 4
  - Labour Day – May 3
  - Whit Monday – May 24
  - August Monday – August 2
- 2022
  - Easter – April 17
  - Labour Day – May 2
  - Whit Monday – June 6
  - August Monday – August 1
- 2023
  - Easter – April 9
  - Labour Day – May 1
  - Whit Monday – May 29
  - August Monday – August 7
- 2024
  - Easter – March 31
  - Labour Day – May 6
  - Whit Monday – May 20
  - August Monday – August 5
- 2025
  - Easter – April 20
  - Labour Day – May 5
  - Whit Monday – June 9
  - August Monday – August 4
- 2026
  - Easter – April 5
  - Labour Day – May
  - Whit Monday –
  - August Monday – August
- 2027
  - Easter – March 28
  - Labour Day – May 4
  - Whit Monday –
  - August Monday – August 3
- 2028
  - Easter – April 16
  - Labour Day – May 1
  - Whit Monday –
  - August Monday – August 7
- 2029
  - Easter – April 1
  - Labour Day – May 1
  - Whit Monday –
  - August Monday – August 7

== See also ==
- Bank holiday
- List of holidays by country
