= Order of the Nation (Antigua and Barbuda) =

Order of chivalry

Most Distinguished Order of the Nation
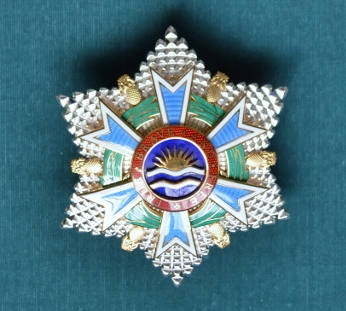
- Star of a Knight or Dame Commander

Awarded by Governor-General of Antigua and Barbuda
- Type: Order of chivalry
- Motto: True, Brave and Free
- Eligibility: Citizens of Antigua and Barbuda and citizens of other countries
- Awarded for: Distinguished and outstanding service to Antigua and Barbuda, the Caricom region or to the international community
- Status: Currently constituted
- Chancellor: Governor-General of Antigua and Barbuda
- Grades: Knight/Dame Grand Collar (KGN/DGN); Knight/Dame Grand Cross (KGCN/DGCN); Knight/Dame Commander (KCN/DCN); Commander (CN); Officer (ON); Member (MN)

Precedence
- Next (higher): Order of the National Hero
- Next (lower): Order of Merit
- Ribbon of the Order of the Nation

The Most Distinguished Order of the Nation is an Antiguan and Barbudan order of chivalry recognising distinguished and outstanding service to Antigua and Barbuda, the CARICOM region or the international community. Originally established by the National Awards Act 1987, that act was repealed and the order was re-established and constituted by the Parliament of Antigua and Barbuda under the National Honours Act 1998 which received Royal Assent from the Governor-General of Antigua and Barbuda on 31 December 1998.

== History ==
The Order of the Nation was first established and constituted by the Parliament of Antigua and Barbuda under the National Awards Act 1987 on February 27, 1987. The order initially had only one grade, with the post-nominal of ON. At the time, it was the highest award of the honours system of Antigua and Barbuda and was awarded for, "heroic service to Antigua and Barbuda."

The National Awards Act 1987 was repealed and the Order was re-established and re-constituted under the National Honours Act 1998, which was amended in 2000, 2001, and 2015. Persons who were members of the Order before the 1998 Act came into force became Knights or Dames Grand Cross of Order. The award criterion was changed to be "distinguished and outstanding service to Antigua and Barbuda."

== Composition ==
The Order is composed of the Chancellor and six classes of members, in descending order of precedence, as follows:

1. Knight Grand Collar (KGN) or Dame Grand Collar (DGN)
2. Knight Grand Cross (KGCN) or Dame Grand Cross (DGCN)
3. Knight Commander (KCN) or Dame Commander (DCN)
4. Commander (CN)
5. Officer (ON)
6. Member (MN)

The Governor-General of Antigua and Barbuda is ex officio Chancellor of the Order. Ordinary Members of the order are citizens of Antigua and Barbuda as well as the Sovereign, the Sovereign's Consort, and the Heir to the Throne. Citizens of other countries may be admitted to the order as members ad honorem.

Appointments of new Knights and Dames Grand Collar, Officers and Members have now been discontinued.

=== Officers ===
The Order has four officers who compose the Chancery of the Order, as follows:

- Chancellor
- Secretary General
- Antigua Herald
- Barbuda Herald

== Appointments ==
Appointments to the Order are made by the Chancellor on the advice of the Prime Minister of Antigua and Barbuda and the Honours Committee established under the 1998 Act. The Honours Committee consists of a person appointed by the Governor-General of Antigua and Barbuda, two Members of the Senate of Antigua and Barbuda and four Members of the House of Representatives of Antigua and Barbuda. The Governor-General appoints the Chairperson of the Honours Committee from amongst its members.

Posthumous appointments to the Order may be made, but a deceased recipient does not appear on the current list of members of the Order.

New appointments are announced each year on the occasion of the Independence Day of Antigua and Barbuda (1 November). The Grand Master conducts investitures at Government House in St. John's.

Among current members of the Order are statesmen, royalty, business leaders, religious leaders and sportsmen.

== Precedence and privileges ==
=== Titles ===
Recipients of Knights Grand Collar, Knights Grand Cross and Knights Commander of the Order may use the title ‘Sir’ in front of their forename, and their wives may use the title ‘Lady’ in front of their husband's surname. Similarly, Dames Grand Collar, Dames Grand Cross and Dames Commander of the Order may use the title ‘Dame’ in front of their forename. No specific privilege exists for their husbands.

The use of titles associated with the awards outside of Antigua and Barbuda remain the prerogative of each recipient's relevant home jurisdiction.

=== Post-nominals and precedence ===
Members of the Order are entitled to place post-nominals after their names as indicated above. They are also assigned a place in the order of precedence of Antigua and Barbuda.

=== Heraldic privileges ===
Knights and Dames Grand Collar and Knights and Dames Grand Cross may petition for heraldic supporters to be granted to their arms. They may also encircle their arms with a circlet bearing the motto of the Order. Knights and Dames Commander and Commanders may encircle their arms with the circlet. The pendent insignia of the Order may be shown below the arms of all members of the Order.

== See also ==
- Order of Princely Heritage
- List of post-nominal letters (Antigua and Barbuda)
- Orders and decorations of the Commonwealth realms
