= Government House, St. John's =

Official residence and office of the Governor-General of Antigua and Barbuda

Government House
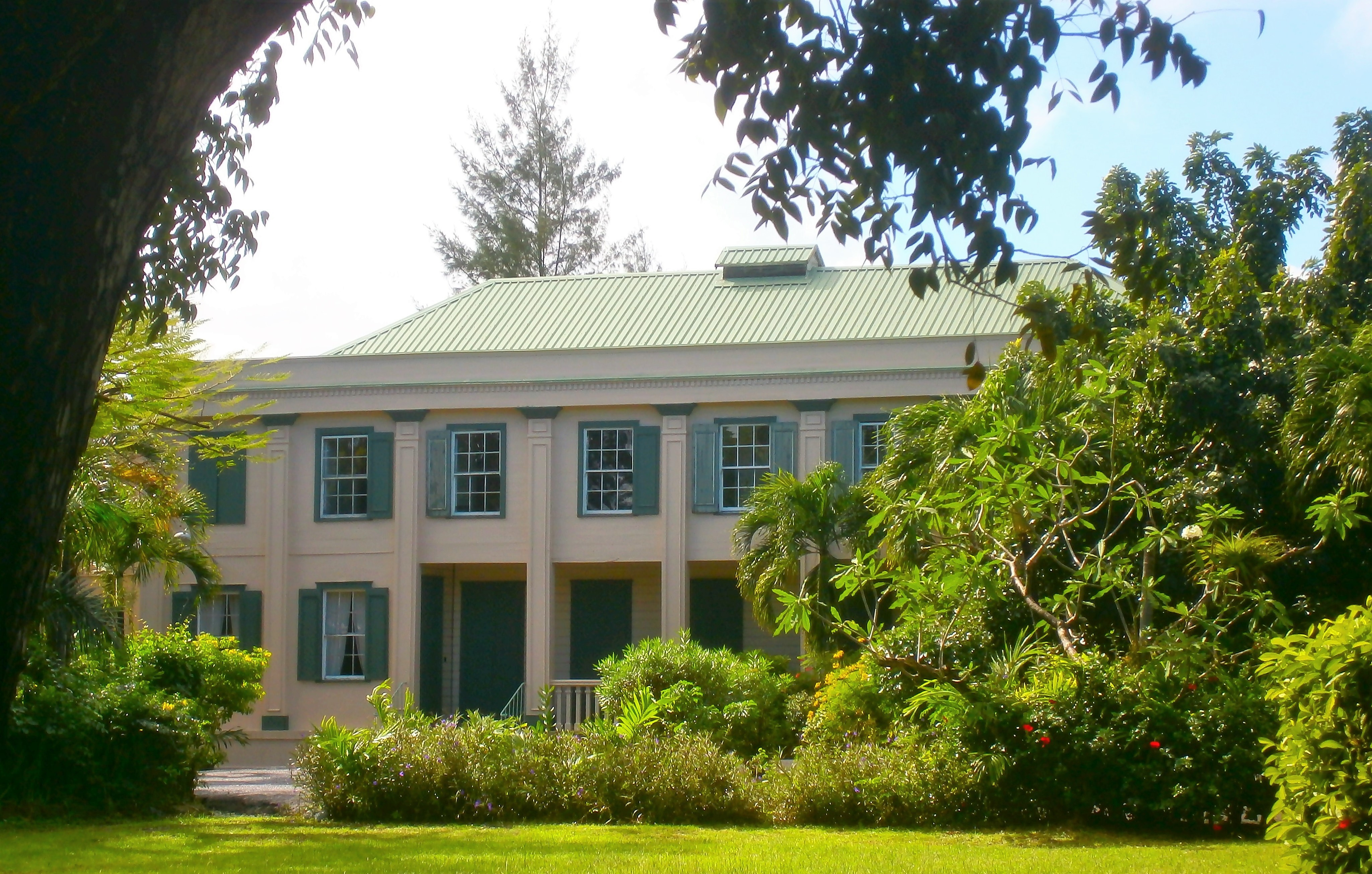
- Government House in December 2016

General information
- Location: St. John's, Antigua and Barbuda
- Coordinates: 17.122879°N 61.840572°W
- Current tenants: Governor-General
- Year built: 1800s
- Owner: Government of Antigua and Barbuda

Technical details
- Floor count: 2

Government House is the official residence and office of the governor-general of Antigua and Barbuda in St. John's. Formerly known as the Federal Government House, it was built in the 17th-century colonial style with Georgian architecture and extensive gardens. The residence was not open to the public until 2026.

== History ==
An early Government House was burnt to the ground in 1710, when the unpopular governor of the Leeward Islands, Colonel Daniel Parke, was killed. Later governors resided in rented homes, although Thomas Pitt (governor 1728–1729) proposed a new permanent residence.

The current Government House was built in the early 1800s. The stately home fell into disrepair, but a private society (along the government) raised funds to have the building restored. The restorations were completed in April 2026, except for the gardens which were scheduled to be completed in November 2026.

In November 2026, Charles III toured the restored residence.

== See also ==
- Government Houses of the British Empire
- Government House, Codrington
- Office of the Prime Minister and Ministry of Foreign Affairs
- Governor-General of Antigua and Barbuda
