= List of titles and honours of Queen Camilla =

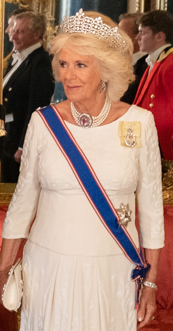
Camilla in 2019, wearing the riband and star of the Royal Victorian Order, and the badge of the Royal Family Order of Queen Elizabeth II

Camilla is Queen of the United Kingdom and the 14 other Commonwealth realms as the wife of King Charles III. She has received numerous titles, decorations, and honorary appointments during her time first as the wife of the heir apparent from 2005 to 2022 and then as the consort of the sovereign since 2022.

== Titles and styles ==
Styles of Queen Camilla
- The Queen's royal cypher
- Reference style: Her Majesty
- Spoken style: Your Majesty

Upon marrying Charles, Prince of Wales, she was commonly styled "Her Royal Highness The Duchess of Cornwall". In Scotland she was known as "Her Royal Highness The Duchess of Rothesay". Although Camilla was legally Princess of Wales, she adopted the feminine form of her husband's highest-ranking subsidiary title, Duke of Cornwall, because the title "Princess of Wales" had become strongly associated with Charles's first wife, Diana. She additionally bore the feminine version of her husband's other titles, including Countess of Chester, Countess of Carrick, Baroness of Renfrew, Lady of the Isles, and Princess of Scotland. In 2021, upon the death of Prince Philip, Duke of Edinburgh, Charles inherited his father's titles, and Camilla thus became Duchess of Edinburgh.

When Charles succeeded his mother, Elizabeth II, Camilla automatically became queen in accordance with English common law. Clarence House had however stated on the occasion of their wedding in 2005 that she would adopt the style of a princess consort instead of queen consort, but there is no legal or historical precedent for such a title. In Queen Elizabeth's 2022 Accession Day message, published to mark the 70th anniversary of her reign, she stated that it was her "sincere wish" for Camilla to be known as queen consort upon Charles's accession to the throne.

Prior to her coronation, Camilla was styled "Her Majesty The Queen Consort", which distinguished her from the recently deceased Queen Elizabeth II. Since the coronation, Camilla has been styled "Her Majesty The Queen" or "Her Majesty Queen Camilla", consistent with past queens consort. In conversation, the correct etiquette is to address her initially as Your Majesty and thereafter as Ma'am (pronounced /mæm/, with a short 'a' as in jam).

== Commonwealth honours ==
Appointments from Commonwealth realms (shown in order in which appointments were made, not order of precedence)
| Country | Date | Appointment | Ribbon | Post-nominal letters |
|---|---|---|---|---|
| United Kingdom | 30 October 2007 | Recipient of the Royal Family Order of Elizabeth II | | |
| United Kingdom | 9 April 2012 | Dame Grand Cross of the Royal Victorian Order | | GCVO |
| Papua New Guinea | 3 November 2012 | Companion of the Order of the Star of Melanesia | | CSM |
| United Kingdom | 9 June 2016 | Member of Her/His Majesty's Most Honourable Privy Council | | PC |
| England and Wales | 1 January 2022 | Royal Lady of the Most Noble Order of the Garter | | LG |
| New Zealand | 5 June 2023 | Additional Member of the Order of New Zealand | | ONZ |
| Scotland | 16 June 2023 | Extra Lady of the Most Ancient and Most Noble Order of the Thistle | | LT |
| United Kingdom | 23 April 2024 | Grand Master and First and Principal Dame Grand Cross of the Most Excellent Order of the British Empire | | GBE |
| United Kingdom | 25 June 2024 | Recipient of the Royal Family Order of Charles III | | |
| Canada | 26 May 2025 | Member of the King's Privy Council for Canada | | PC (Can.) |

Decorations and medals (shown in order in which appointments were made, not order of precedence)
| Country | Date | Appointment | Ribbon | Post-nominal letters |
|---|---|---|---|---|
| Canada | 7 June 2005 | Commemorative Medal for the Centennial of Saskatchewan | | |
| United Kingdom | 6 February 2012 | Queen Elizabeth II Diamond Jubilee Medal | | |
| Papua New Guinea | 3 November 2012 | Queen Elizabeth II Diamond Jubilee Medal (Papua New Guinea) | | |
| United Kingdom | 6 February 2022 | Queen Elizabeth II Platinum Jubilee Medal | | |
| Canada | 1 February 2023 | Canadian Forces' Decoration | | CD |

== Foreign honours ==
Appointments from non-Commonwealth countries (shown in order in which appointments were made, not order of precedence)
| Country | Date | Appointment | Ribbon | Post-nominal letters |
|---|---|---|---|---|
| France | 6 June 2014 | Grand Cross of the National Order of Merit | | |
| Mexico | 9 September 2015 | Grand Cross of the Mexican Order of the Aztec Eagle | | |
| Germany | 29 March 2023 | Grand Cross Special Class of the Order of Merit of the Federal Republic of Germany | | |
| Italy | 4 April 2025 | Knight Grand Cross of the Order of Merit of the Italian Republic | | OMRI |
| France | 8 July 2025 | Grand Cross of the National Order of the Legion of Honour | | |
| Holy See | 23 October 2025 | Dame Grand Cross of the Order of Pope Pius IX | | GCPO |
| Oman | 20 October 2026 | First Class of the Order of Oman | | |

Decorations and medals (shown in order in which appointments were made, not order of precedence)
| Country | Date | Appointment | Ribbon |
|---|---|---|---|
| The Netherlands | 30 April 2013 | Recipient of the King Willem-Alexander Inauguration Medal, 2013 | |

== Honorary military appointments ==
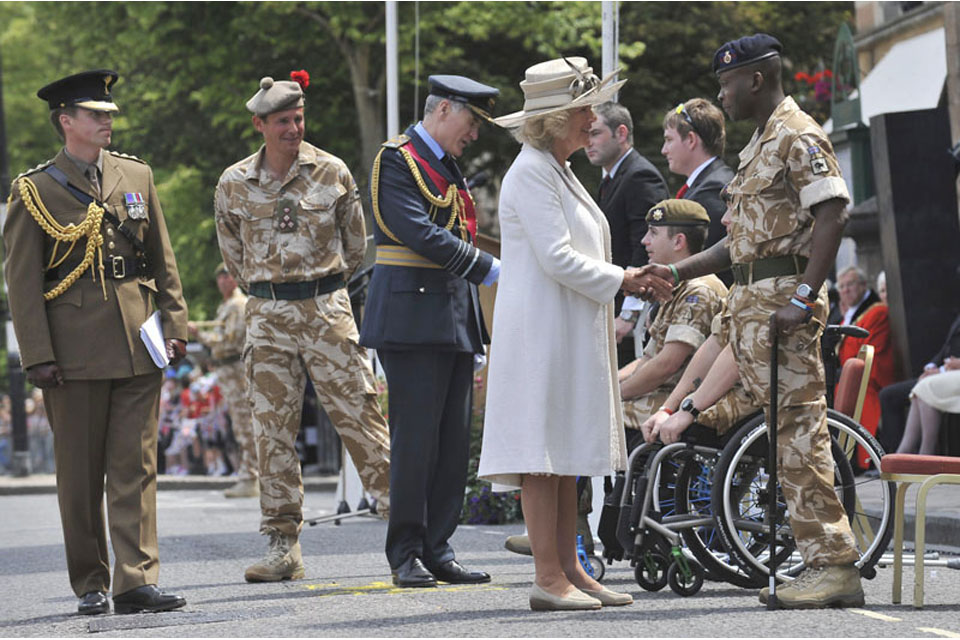
The then-Duchess of Cornwall at the 11th Light Brigade homecoming parade, 2010

Australia

- (Australia) 2012 – : Colonel-in-Chief, The Royal Australian Corps of Military Police

Canada

- 2011 – : Colonel-in-Chief, The Queen's Own Rifles of Canada

United Kingdom

- (United Kingdom) 2006 – : Commodore-in-Chief, The Royal Navy Medical Service
- (United Kingdom) 2007 – : Lady Sponsor of HMS Astute
- (United Kingdom) 2007 – : Lady Sponsor of MS Queen Victoria
- (United Kingdom) 2007 – : Royal Colonel, 4th Battalion, The Rifles (4th Battalion, Ranger Regiment since 2021)
- (United Kingdom) 2008 – : Honorary Air Commodore of RAF Halton
- (United Kingdom) 2008 – : Honorary Air Commodore of RAF Leeming
- (United Kingdom) 2009 – : Commodore-in-Chief, The Royal Navy Chaplaincy Service
- (United Kingdom) 2017 – : Lady Sponsor of HMS Prince of Wales (R09)
- (United Kingdom) 2020 – : Colonel-in-Chief, The Rifles
- (United Kingdom) 2020 – : Colonel-in-Chief, Special Reconnaissance Regiment
- (United Kingdom) 2022 – : Colonel, Grenadier Guards
- (United Kingdom) 2023 – : Colonel-in-Chief, The Royal Lancers (Queen Elizabeths' Own)
- (United Kingdom) 2023 – : Patron, The Royal Army Chaplains Department
- 2025 – : Vice-Admiral of the United Kingdom

== Non-national titles and honours ==
=== Livery companies ===
| Date | Company | Position |
|---|---|---|
| 2011 | Worshipful Company of Joiners and Ceilers | Honorary Liveryman |
| 2015 | Worshipful Company of Plaisterers | Honorary Liveryman |
| 2017 | Worshipful Company of Vintners | Liveryman |
| 2017 | Worshipful Company of Plumbers | Honorary Liveryman |
| 2024 | Worshipful Company of Fan Makers | Honorary Liveryman |
| 2025 | Worshipful Company of Stationers and Newspaper Makers | Honorary Freeman and Liveryman |

=== Charity awards ===
| Date | Institution | Award |
|---|---|---|
| 2005 | The National Osteoporosis Foundation | Ethel LeFrak Award |
| 2007 | Royal Osteoporosis Society | Kohn Foundation Award |

=== Scholastic ===
University positions
| Country | Date | University | Position |
|---|---|---|---|
| England | 13 September 2007 | King's College London | Honorary Fellow |
| Scotland | 10 June 2013 | University of Aberdeen | Chancellor |

Honorary degrees
| Country | Date | University | Degree |
|---|---|---|---|
| Scotland | 10 June 2013 | University of Aberdeen | Doctor of Laws (LLD) |
| England | 11 February 2016 | University of Southampton | Doctor of Science (DSc) |
| England | 16 March 2018 | University of Chester | Doctor of Letters (DLitt) |
| England | 20 November 2024 | University of London | Doctor of Literature (DLitt) |

=== Dynastic orders ===
| Appointer | Date | Appointment |
|---|---|---|
| Kīngitanga | 5 May 2023 | Member First Class of the Order of Queen Te Arikinui Te Atairangikāhu |

== Honorific eponyms ==
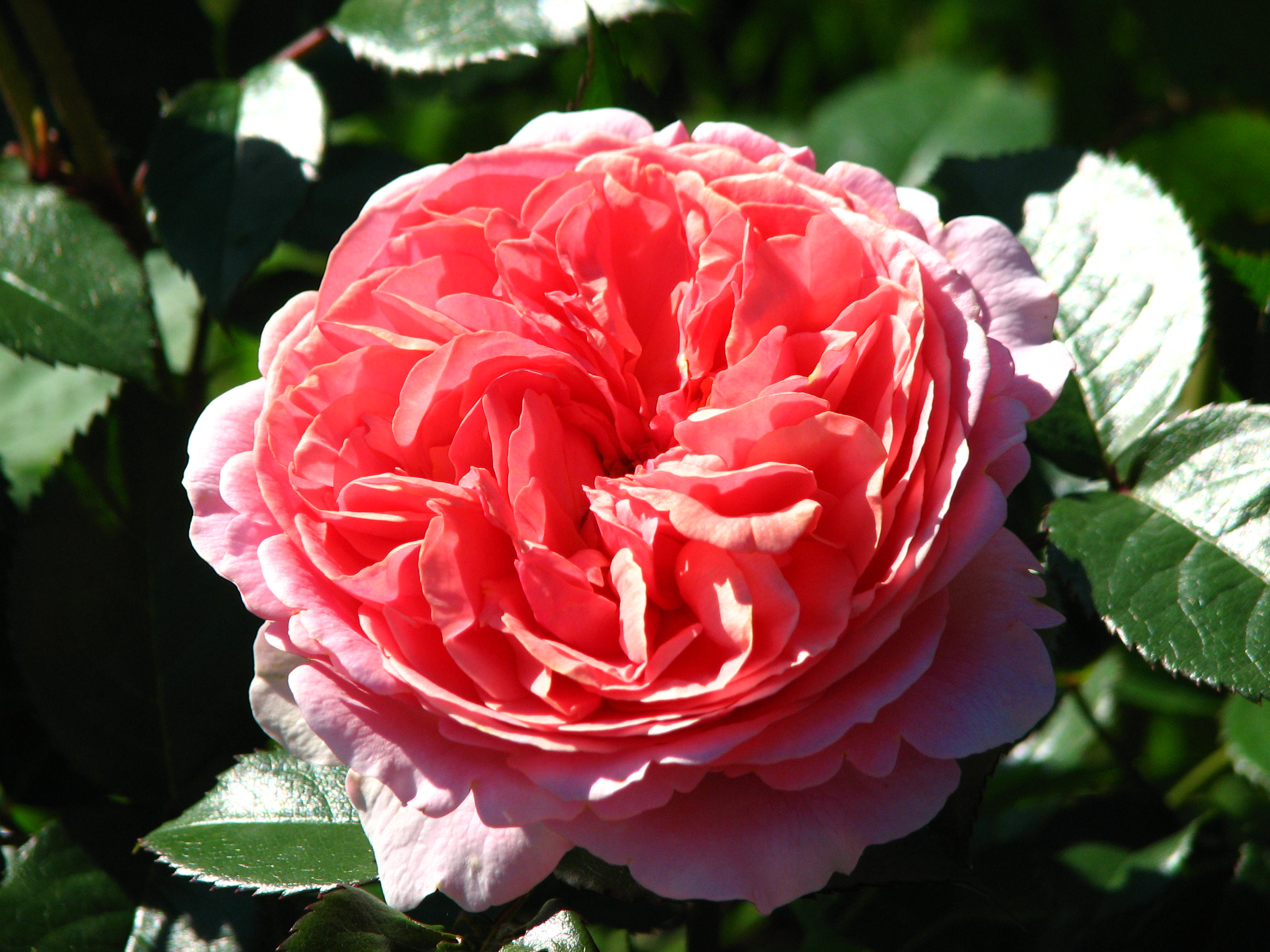
Rosa 'Duchess of Cornwall'

=== Awards ===
- United Kingdom: The Queen's Award for Osteoporosis (formerly the Duchess of Cornwall's Award)

=== Buildings ===
- Samoa: The Queen Camilla Pre-School of Hope, Samoa
- United Kingdom: The Duchess of Cornwall Inn, Dorchester, Dorset, England
- United Kingdom: Duchess of Cornwall Centre for Osteoporosis, Royal Cornwall Hospital, Truro, Cornwall

=== Geographical locations ===
- Canada: Prince of Wales and Duchess of Cornwall Trail System, Bonshaw Provincial Park

=== Miscellaneous ===
- "The Duchess of Cornwall" Helicopter
- Rosa 'Duchess of Cornwall'

== Memberships and fellowships ==
| Country | Date | Organisation | Position |
|---|---|---|---|
| England | April 2009 – present | The Ebony Horse Club | President |
| United Kingdom | November 2010 – present | National Literacy Trust | Patron |
| United Kingdom | 2011 – present | BookTrust | Patron |
| United Kingdom | 15 February 2012 – present | The Honourable Society of Gray's Inn | Royal Bencher |
| United Kingdom | December 2012 – present | Royal Voluntary Service | President |
| United Kingdom | 2018 – present | Royal Commonwealth Society | Vice Patron |
| United Kingdom | 2020 – present | Royal Academy of Dance | Vice Patron |
| England | 18 March 2022 – present | Royal National Theatre | Royal Patron |
| United Kingdom | 20 November 2023 – present | Foreign Press Association | Honorary Member |
| United Kingdom | | Royal Society of Literature | Patron |
| United Kingdom | 5 November 2025 – present | National Association of Care Catering | Honorary Member |

== See also ==
- List of titles and honours of Charles III
- List of titles and honours of William, Prince of Wales
- List of titles and honours of Catherine, Princess of Wales
- List of titles and honours of Elizabeth II
- List of titles and honours of Prince Philip, Duke of Edinburgh
- List of titles and honours of Anne, Princess Royal
- List of titles and honours of Prince Edward, Duke of Edinburgh
- List of titles and honours of George VI
- List of titles and honours of Queen Elizabeth the Queen Mother
- List of titles and honours of George V
- List of titles and honours of Mary of Teck
- List of titles and honours of Edward VIII
- List of titles and honours of Prince Arthur, Duke of Connaught and Strathearn
