= List of titles and honours of Elizabeth II =

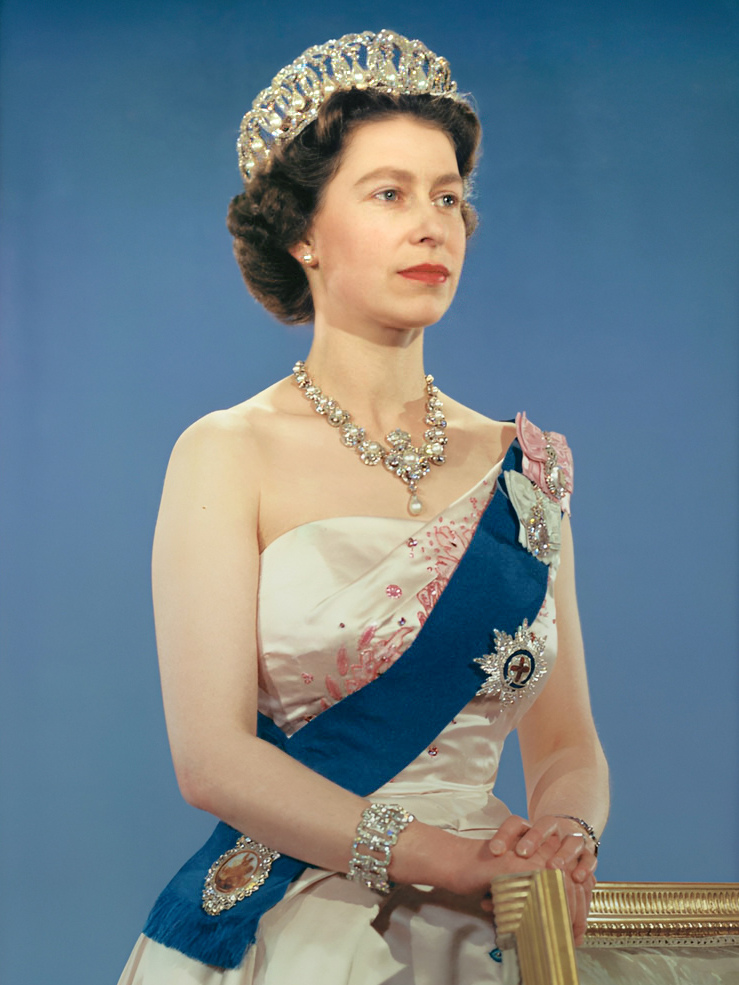
Family orders and insignia of the Order of the Garter

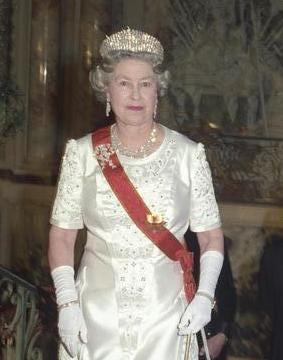
Insignia of the Grand Cross Special Class of the Order of Merit of the Federal Republic of Germany

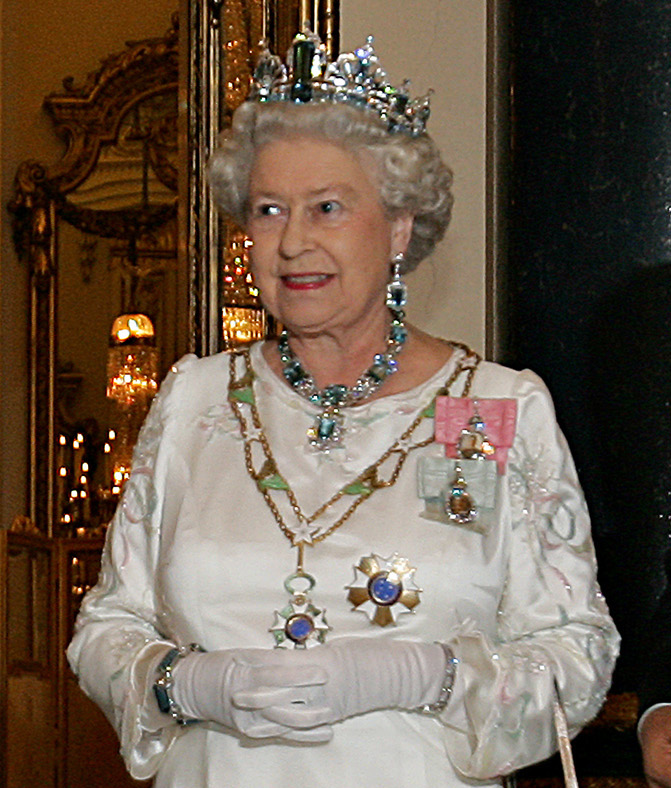
Star and collar of the Order of the Southern Cross, the highest Brazilian order awarded to foreign heads of state

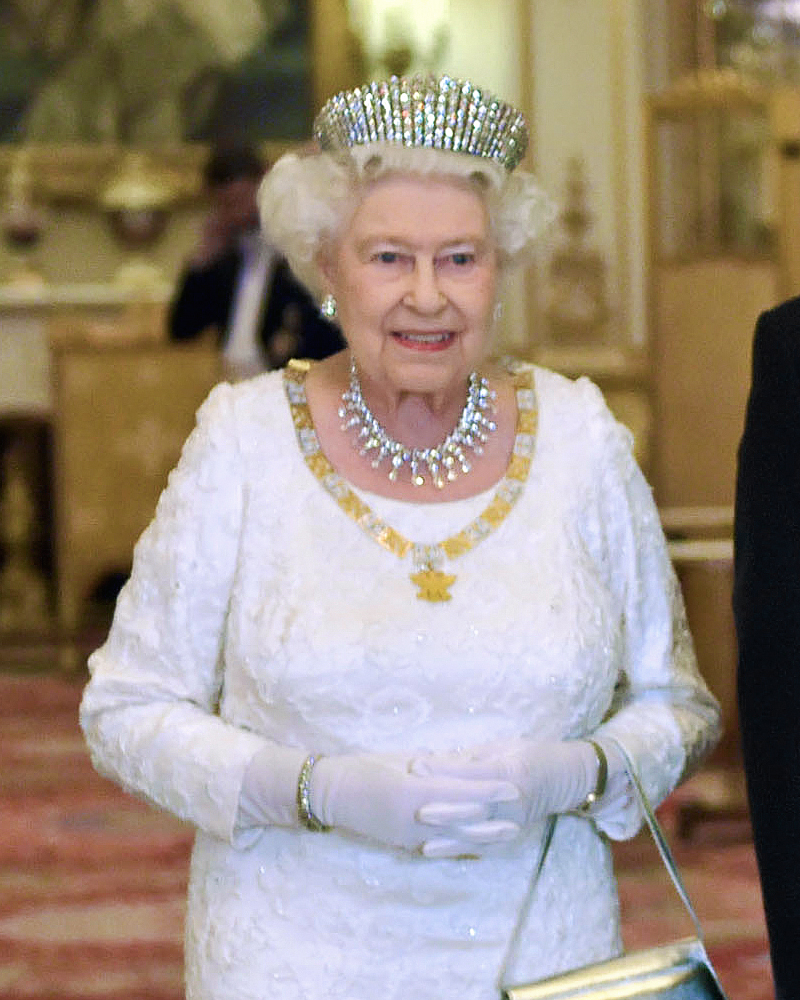
Grand Collar of the Order of the Aztec Eagle, the highest Mexican order awarded to foreign heads of state

Queen Elizabeth II wearing orders and decorations of different countries

Elizabeth II held numerous titles and honours, both during and before her time as monarch of each of her Commonwealth realms. Each is listed below; where two dates are shown, the first indicates the date of receiving the title or award (the title as Princess Elizabeth of York being given as from her birth), and the second indicates the date of its loss or renunciation.

== Royal titles and styles ==
Elizabeth was originally styled "Her Royal Highness Princess Elizabeth of York". Between her father's accession in 1936 and her marriage in 1947 she was known as "Her Royal Highness The Princess Elizabeth". From her marriage until her accession in 1952 she was styled "Her Royal Highness The Princess Elizabeth, Duchess of Edinburgh". Throughout her reign she was styled "Her Majesty The Queen".

Upon Elizabeth's accession to the throne, she was asked by her Private Secretary what her regnal name would be, to which she responded, "My own, of course—what else?" Until 1953, her official style was by the Grace of God, of Great Britain, Ireland and the British Dominions beyond the Seas, Queen, Defender of the Faith. She was proclaimed as queen using that title in Canada and South Africa, whereas, in Australia, New Zealand, and the United Kingdom, she was proclaimed as Queen Elizabeth the Second, by the Grace of God Queen of this Realm and of Her other Realms and Territories, Head of the Commonwealth, Defender of the Faith.

A decision was reached by Elizabeth's prime ministers at the Commonwealth Prime Ministers' Conference of 1952, whereby the Queen would accord herself different styles and titles in each of her realms, reflecting that in each state she acted as monarch of that particular country, regardless of her other roles. Canada's preferred format was: Elizabeth the Second, by the Grace of God, Queen of Canada and of Her other realms and territories, Head of the Commonwealth, Defender of the Faith. However, as Australia wished to have the United Kingdom mentioned in all the Queen's titles, the resolution reached was a designation that included the United Kingdom as well as, for the first time, separate reference to the other Commonwealth realms. Thereafter, separate but parallel royal styles and titles acts were passed in each of the Commonwealth realms, granting Elizabeth a distinct but similarly constituted title in each state, meaning that when Elizabeth was crowned in the same year, she held seven separate titles.

With further evolution of the Commonwealth since that time, Elizabeth held at the time of her death 15 different regnal titles, one for each of the current Commonwealth realms. In all realms other than Canada and Grenada, the reference to the United Kingdom has been removed; Australia doing so in 1973, in contrast to the Australian government's position 20 years earlier. Traditionally, the Queen's titles are listed in the order in which the realms other than the United Kingdom (the original realm) first became Dominions—namely, Canada (1867), Australia (1901), and New Zealand (1907)—followed by the rest in the order in which the former colony became an independent realm: Jamaica (1962), The Bahamas (1973), Grenada (1974), Papua New Guinea (1975), the Solomon Islands (1978), Tuvalu (1978), Saint Lucia (1979), Saint Vincent and the Grenadines (1979), Belize (1981), Antigua and Barbuda (1981) and Saint Kitts and Nevis (1983).

Owing to her status, Elizabeth II was usually just known as "The Queen" across the world.

The Queen's British styles and titles were read out at her funeral by David White, Garter Principal King of Arms, as follows:

Thus it hath pleased Almighty God to take out of this transitory life unto His Divine Mercy the late Most High, Most Mighty, and Most Excellent Monarch, Elizabeth the Second, by the Grace of God of the United Kingdom of Great Britain and Northern Ireland and of Her other Realms and Territories Queen, Head of the Commonwealth, Defender of the Faith, and Sovereign of the Most Noble Order of the Garter.

The Queen's New Zealand styles and titles were read out at the State Memorial Service at the Wellington Cathedral on 26 September by Phillip O'Shea, New Zealand Herald of Arms Extraordinary, as follows:

The Royal style and titles of Her Late Majesty, for use in relation to New Zealand and all other territories for whose foreign relations Her Government in New Zealand is responsible, were—

Elizabeth the Second, by the Grace of God Queen of New Zealand and Her Other Realms and Territories, Head of the Commonwealth, Defender of the Faith.

Sovereign of The Order of New Zealand, Sovereign of The New Zealand Order of Merit, and Sovereign of The Queen's Service Order.

Now, it is upon His Majesty King Charles III, King of New Zealand, that these styles, titles and honours have devolved.

God save the King!

=== Dispute in Scotland ===
Though the situation was the same in every one of the Queen's realms beyond the United Kingdom, only within Scotland did the title Elizabeth II cause controversy as there had never been an Elizabeth I in Scotland. In an act of sabotage, new Royal Mail post boxes in Scotland, bearing the royal cypher EIIR, were vandalised, after which, to avoid further problems, post boxes and Royal Mail vehicles in Scotland bore only the Crown of Scotland. A legal case, MacCormick v. Lord Advocate (1953 SC 396), was taken to contest the right of the Queen to title herself Elizabeth II within Scotland, arguing that to do so would be a breach of the Act of Union. The case, however, was lost on the grounds that the pursuers had not title to sue the Crown and the numbering of monarchs was part of the royal prerogative, and thus not governed by the Act of Union. Winston Churchill suggested that future British monarchs should be numbered according to either their English or Scottish predecessors, whichever number is higher.

At the opening ceremony of the devolved Scottish Parliament in Edinburgh in 1999, attended by the Queen, the Presiding Officer, Lord Steel of Aikwood, said at the close of his opening address: "It is good that today, once again, we the elected representatives of the people are able to welcome your majesty, not only as Queen of the United Kingdom, but seated as you are among us, to greet you in the historic and constitutionally correct manner, with warmth and affection, as Queen of Scots." In 2002 Winnie Ewing, then president of the Scottish National Party, wrote to the Queen asking her to adopt the title Elizabeth I in Scotland.

Other realms adopted the style "Queen Elizabeth II" despite never having been ruled by Queen Elizabeth I of England.

=== Regnal titles ===
Country	Date	Title
Antigua and Barbuda	1 November 1981 – 11 February 1982	Elizabeth the Second, by the Grace of God, of the United Kingdom of Great Britain and Northern Ireland and of Her other Realms and Territories Queen, Head of the Commonwealth, Defender of the Faith
Antigua and Barbuda	11 February 1982 – 8 September 2022	Elizabeth the Second, by the Grace of God, Queen of Antigua and Barbuda and of Her other Realms and Territories, Head of the Commonwealth
The Bahamas	10 July 1973 – 27 December 1973	Elizabeth the Second, by the Grace of God, of the United Kingdom of Great Britain and Northern Ireland and of Her other Realms and Territories Queen, Head of The Commonwealth, Defender of the Faith
The Bahamas	27 December 1973 – 8 September 2022	Elizabeth the Second, by the Grace of God, Queen of the Commonwealth of The Bahamas and of Her other Realms and Territories, Head of the Commonwealth
Belize	21 September 1981 – 1981	Elizabeth the Second, by the Grace of God, of the United Kingdom of Great Britain and Northern Ireland and of Her other Realms and Territories Queen, Head of the Commonwealth, Defender of the Faith
Belize	1981 – 8 September 2022	Elizabeth the Second, by the Grace of God, Queen of Belize and of Her Other Realms and Territories, Head of the Commonwealth
Canada	6 February 1952 – 29 May 1953	In English: Elizabeth the Second, by the Grace of God, of Great Britain, Ireland and the British Dominions beyond the Seas Queen, Defender of the Faith In French: Elizabeth Deux, par la Grâce de Dieu, Reine de Grande-Bretagne, d'Irlande et des Territoires britanniques au delà des mers, Défenseur de la Foi
Canada	29 May 1953 – 8 September 2022	In English: Elizabeth the Second, by the Grace of God of the United Kingdom, Canada and Her other Realms and Territories Queen, Head of the Commonwealth, Defender of the Faith (Note: In some cases, such as an oath of allegiance, Elizabeth's Canadian title is shortened to Her Majesty Queen Elizabeth the Second, Queen of Canada. On Canadian coins, it is rendered in Latin as Elizabeth II D.G. Regina ("Elizabeth II Dei Gratia Regina", or, in English, "Elizabeth II, by the Grace of God, Queen").) In French: Elizabeth Deux, par la grâce de Dieu Reine du Royaume-Uni, du Canada et de ses autres royaumes et territoires, Chef du Commonwealth, Défenseur de la Foi (Note: In some older documents in French, Elizabeth's name is spelled Élisabeth or Elisabeth.)
Grenada	7 February 1974 – 1974	Elizabeth the Second, by the Grace of God, of the United Kingdom of Great Britain and Northern Ireland and of Her other Realms and Territories Queen, Head of The Commonwealth, Defender of the Faith
Grenada	1974 – 8 September 2022	Elizabeth the Second, by the Grace of God, Queen of the United Kingdom of Great Britain and Northern Ireland and of Grenada and Her other Realms and Territories, Head of the Commonwealth
Jamaica	6 August 1962 – 31 August 1962	Elizabeth the Second, by the Grace of God, of the United Kingdom of Great Britain and Northern Ireland and of Her other Realms and Territories Queen, Head of the Commonwealth, Defender of the Faith
Jamaica	31 August 1962 – 8 September 2022	Elizabeth the Second, by the Grace of God of Jamaica and of Her other Realms and Territories Queen, Head of the Commonwealth
Saint Kitts and Nevis	19 September 1983 – 1983	Elizabeth the Second, by the Grace of God, of the United Kingdom of Great Britain and Northern Ireland and of Her other Realms and Territories Queen, Head of The Commonwealth, Defender of the Faith
Saint Kitts and Nevis	1983 – 8 September 2022	Elizabeth the Second, by the Grace of God of Saint Christopher and Nevis Queen, Head of the Commonwealth
Saint Lucia	22 February 1979 – 1979	Elizabeth the Second, by the Grace of God, of the United Kingdom of Great Britain and Northern Ireland and of Her other Realms and Territories Queen, Head of The Commonwealth, Defender of the Faith
Saint Lucia	1979 – 8 September 2022	Elizabeth the Second, by the Grace of God Queen of Saint Lucia and of Her other Realms and Territories, Head of the Commonwealth
Saint Vincent and the Grenadines	27 October 1979 – 1979	Elizabeth the Second, by the Grace of God, of the United Kingdom of Great Britain and Northern Ireland and of Her other Realms and Territories Queen, Head of The Commonwealth, Defender of the Faith
Saint Vincent and the Grenadines	1979 – 8 September 2022	Elizabeth the Second, by the Grace of God, Queen of Saint Vincent and the Grenadines and Her other Realms and Territories, Head of the Commonwealth
United Kingdom	6 February 1952 – 28 May 1953	In English: Elizabeth II, by the Grace of God, of Great Britain, Ireland and the British Dominions beyond the Seas Queen, Defender of the Faith In Latin: Elizabeth II, Dei Gratia Magnae Britanniae, Hiberniae et terrarum transmarinarum quae in ditione sunt Britannica Regina, Fidei Defensor
United Kingdom	29 May 1953 – 8 September 2022	In English: Elizabeth II, by the Grace of God, of the United Kingdom of Great Britain and Northern Ireland and of Her other Realms and Territories Queen, Head of the Commonwealth, Defender of the Faith In Latin: Elizabeth II, Dei Gratia Britanniarum Regnorumque Suorum Ceterorum Regina, Consortionis Populorum Princeps, Fidei Defensor In Welsh: Elizabeth yr Ail, trwy Ras Duw, o Deyrnas Unedig Prydain Fawr a Gogledd Iwerddon a'i Theyrnasoedd a'i Thiriogaethau eraill, Brenhines, Pennaeth y Gymanwlad, Amddiffynnydd y Ffydd
Australia	6 February 1952 – 29 May 1953	Elizabeth the Second, by the Grace of God, of Great Britain, Ireland and the British Dominions beyond the Seas Queen, Defender of the Faith
Australia	29 May 1953 – 19 October 1973	Elizabeth the Second, by the Grace of God, of the United Kingdom, Australia and Her other Realms and Territories Queen, Head of the Commonwealth, Defender of the Faith (Note: This title is shown on the Great Seal of Victoria in Latin as Elizabeth II Dei Gratia Britanniarum Terrae Australis Regnorumque Suorum Ceterorum Regina, Consortionis Populorum Princeps, Fidei Defensor.)
Australia	19 October 1973 – 8 September 2022	Elizabeth the Second, by the Grace of God Queen of Australia and Her other Realms and Territories, Head of the Commonwealth
New Zealand	6 February 1952 – 29 May 1953	Elizabeth the Second, by the Grace of God, of Great Britain, Ireland and the British Dominions beyond the Seas Queen, Defender of the Faith
New Zealand	29 May 1953 – 6 February 1974	Elizabeth the Second, by the Grace of God, of the United Kingdom, New Zealand and Her Other Realms and Territories Queen, Head of the Commonwealth, Defender of the Faith
New Zealand	6 February 1974 – 8 September 2022	In English: Elizabeth the Second, by the Grace of God Queen of New Zealand and Her Other Realms and Territories, Head of the Commonwealth, Defender of the Faith In Māori: Irihāpeti Te Tuarua, nā te huatau o te Atua, te Kuini o Aotearoa me ērā atu o Ōna Whaitua, Rohe hoki, te Upoko o te Kāhui Whenua, te Kaiwawao o te Whakapono
Papua New Guinea	16 September 1975 – 8 September 2022	Elizabeth the Second, Queen of Papua New Guinea and Her other Realms and Territories, Head of the Commonwealth
Solomon Islands	7 July 1978 – 1 November 2013	Elizabeth the Second, by the Grace of God of the United Kingdom of Great Britain and Northern Ireland and of Her other Realms and Territories Queen, Head of the Commonwealth, Defender of the Faith
Solomon Islands	1 November 2013 – 8 September 2022	Elizabeth the Second, by the Grace of God, Queen of Solomon Islands and Her other Realms and Territories, Head of the Commonwealth
Tuvalu	1 October 1978 – 12 May 1987	Elizabeth the Second, by the Grace of God, of the United Kingdom of Great Britain and Northern Ireland and of Her other Realms and Territories Queen, Head of the Commonwealth, Defender of the Faith
Tuvalu	12 May 1987 – 8 September 2022	Elizabeth the Second, by the Grace of God Queen of Tuvalu and of Her other Realms and Territories, Head of the Commonwealth
Ghana	6 March 1957 – 27 July 1957	Elizabeth the Second, by the Grace of God, of the United Kingdom of Great Britain and Northern Ireland and of Her other Realms and Territories Queen, Head of the Commonwealth, Defender of the Faith
Ghana	27 July 1957 – 30 June 1960	Elizabeth the Second, Queen of Ghana and of Her other Realms and Territories, Head of the Commonwealth
Nigeria	1 October 1960 – 1 June 1961	Elizabeth the Second, by the Grace of God, of the United Kingdom of Great Britain and Northern Ireland and of Her other Realms and Territories Queen, Head of the Commonwealth, Defender of the Faith
Nigeria	1 June 1961 – 1 October 1963	Elizabeth the Second, Queen of Nigeria and of Her other Realms and Territories, Head of the Commonwealth
Sierra Leone	27 April 1961 – 16 November 1961	Elizabeth the Second, by the Grace of God, of the United Kingdom of Great Britain and Northern Ireland and of Her other Realms and Territories Queen, Head of the Commonwealth, Defender of the Faith
Sierra Leone	16 November 1961 – 19 April 1971	Elizabeth the Second, Queen of Sierra Leone and of Her Other Realms and Territories, Head of the Commonwealth
(Tanganyika (1961–1964)) Tanganyika (Note: Now part of Tanzania.)	9 December 1961 – 12 January 1962	Elizabeth the Second, by the Grace of God, of the United Kingdom of Great Britain and Northern Ireland and of Her other Realms and Territories Queen, Head of the Commonwealth, Defender of the Faith
(Tanganyika (1961–1964)) Tanganyika	12 January 1962 – 9 December 1962	Elizabeth the Second, Queen of Tanganyika and of Her Other Realms and Territories, Head of the Commonwealth
Uganda	9 October 1962 – 2 November 1962	Elizabeth the Second, by the Grace of God, of the United Kingdom of Great Britain and Northern Ireland and of Her other Realms and Territories Queen, Head of the Commonwealth, Defender of the Faith
Uganda	2 November 1962 – 9 October 1963	Elizabeth the Second, by the Grace of God, Queen of Uganda and of Her other Realms and Territories, Head of the Commonwealth
Kenya	12 December 1963 – 21 April 1964	Elizabeth the Second, by the Grace of God, of the United Kingdom of Great Britain and Northern Ireland and of Her other Realms and Territories Queen, Head of the Commonwealth, Defender of the Faith
Kenya	21 April 1964 – 12 December 1964	Elizabeth the Second, Queen of Kenya and of Her other Realms and Territories, Head of the Commonwealth
Malawi	6 July 1964 – 1964	Elizabeth the Second, by the Grace of God, of the United Kingdom of Great Britain and Northern Ireland and of Her other Realms and Territories Queen, Head of the Commonwealth, Defender of the Faith
Malawi	1964 – 6 July 1966	Elizabeth the Second, by the Grace of God Queen of Malawi and of Her other Reals and Territories, Head of the Commonwealth
Mauritius	12 March 1968 – 25 April 1968	Elizabeth the Second, by the Grace of God, of the United Kingdom of Great Britain and Northern Ireland and of Her other Realms and Territories Queen, Head of the Commonwealth, Defender of the Faith
Mauritius	25 April 1968 – 12 March 1992	Elizabeth the Second, Queen of Mauritius and of Her other Realms and Territories, Head of the Commonwealth
South Africa	6 February 1952 – 29 May 1953	In English: Elizabeth II, by the Grace of God of Great Britain, Ireland and the British Dominions beyond the Seas Queen, Defender of the Faith In Afrikaans: Elizabeth II, Deur Gods Genade, van Groot-Brittanje, Ierland en die Britse Oorsese Geweste Koningin, Verdediger van die Geloof In Latin: Elizabeth II, Dei Gratia Magnae Britanniae, Hiberniae et terrarum transmarinarum quae in ditione sunt Britannica Regina, Fidei Defensor
South Africa	29 May 1953 – 31 May 1961	In English: Elizabeth II, Queen of South Africa and of Her other Realms and Territories, Head of the Commonwealth In Afrikaans: Elizabeth II, Koningin van Suid-Afrika en van Haar ander Koninkryke en Gebiede, Hoof van die Statebond In Latin: Elizabeth II, Africae Australis regnorumque suo rum ceterorum Regina, consortionis populorum Princeps
The Gambia	18 February 1965 – 18 June 1965	Elizabeth the Second, by the Grace of God, of the United Kingdom of Great Britain and Northern Ireland and of Her other Realms and Territories Queen, Head of the Commonwealth, Defender of the Faith
The Gambia	18 June 1965 – 24 April 1970	Elizabeth the Second, Queen of The Gambia and all Her other Realms and Territories, Head of the Commonwealth
Trinidad and Tobago	31 August 1962 – 2 November 1962	Elizabeth the Second, by the Grace of God, of the United Kingdom of Great Britain and Northern Ireland and of Her other Realms and Territories Queen, Head of the Commonwealth, Defender of the Faith
Trinidad and Tobago	2 November 1962 – 1 August 1976	Elizabeth the Second, by the Grace of God, Queen of Trinidad and Tobago and of Her other Realms and Territories, Head of the Commonwealth
Guyana	26 May 1966 – 18 June 1966	Elizabeth the Second, by the Grace of God, of the United Kingdom of Great Britain and Northern Ireland and of Her other Realms and Territories Queen, Head of the Commonwealth, Defender of the Faith
Guyana	18 June 1966 – 23 February 1970	Elizabeth the Second, by the Grace of God, Queen of Guyana and of Her other Realms and Territories, Head of the Commonwealth
Barbados	30 November 1966 – 4 May 1967	Elizabeth the Second, by the Grace of God, of the United Kingdom of Great Britain and Northern Ireland and of Her other Realms and Territories Queen, Head of the Commonwealth, Defender of the Faith
Barbados	4 May 1967 – 30 November 2021	Elizabeth the Second, by the Grace of God, Queen of Barbados and of Her other Realms and Territories, Head of the Commonwealth
Pakistan	6 February 1952 – 29 May 1953	Elizabeth the Second, by the Grace of God, of Great Britain, Ireland and the British Dominions beyond the Seas Queen, Defender of the Faith
Pakistan	29 May 1953 – 23 March 1956	Elizabeth the Second, Queen of the United Kingdom and of Her other Realms and Territories, Head of the Commonwealth
Ceylon (Note: Now Sri Lanka.)	6 February 1952 – 4 June 1953	Elizabeth the Second, by the Grace of God, of Great Britain, Ireland and the British Dominions beyond the Seas Queen, Defender of the Faith
Ceylon	4 June 1953 – 22 May 1972	Elizabeth the Second, Queen of Ceylon and of Her other Realms and Territories, Head of the Commonwealth
Malta	21 September 1964 – 18 January 1965	In English: Elizabeth the Second, by the Grace of God, of the United Kingdom of Great Britain and Northern Ireland and of Her other Realms and Territories Queen, Head of the Commonwealth, Defender of the Faith In Maltese: Eliżabetta II, Għall-Grazzja t'Alla tar-Renju Unit tal-Britannja l-Kbira u ta' l-Irlanda ta' Fuq u tar-Renji u t-Territorji l-Oħra Tagħha, Reġina, Kap tal-Commonwealth u Difenditriċi tal-Fidi
Malta	18 January 1965 – 13 December 1974	In English: Elizabeth the Second, by the Grace of God, Queen of Malta and of Her other Realms and Territories, Head of the Commonwealth In Maltese: Eliżabetta II, Għall-Grazzja t'Alla, Reġina ta' Malta u tar-Renji u t-Territorji l-Oħra Tagħha, Kap tal-Commonwealth
Fiji	10 October 1970 – 27 November 1970	Elizabeth the Second, by the Grace of God, of the United Kingdom of Great Britain and Northern Ireland and of Her other Realms and Territories Queen, Head of the Commonwealth, Defender of the Faith
Fiji	27 November 1970 – 6 October 1987	Elizabeth the Second, by the Grace of God, Queen of Fiji and of Her other Realms and Territories, Head of the Commonwealth

=== Other ===
Region	Date	Title	Ref
Braemar, Scotland	6 February 1952 – 8 September 2022	Chieftain of the Braemar Gathering	
Duchy of Lancaster	6 February 1952 – 8 September 2022	Duke of Lancaster	
England	6 February 1952 – 8 September 2022	Seigneur of the Swans	
Fiji	1961 – 14 March 2012	In Fijian: Ilisapeci – Na Radi ni Viti kei Peritania In English: Elizabeth – Queen of Fiji and Great Britain	
Fiji	1998 – 14 March 2012	In Fijian: Tui Viti or Vunivalu In English: Queen or paramount chief of Fiji	
Gibraltar	6 May 2010 – 8 September 2022	Queen of Gibraltar	(Note: The kingship of Gibraltar continues to be among the titles of the Spanish monarchy. However, since 2010 the Government of Gibraltar has started to use the title "Queen of Gibraltar" in reference to Elizabeth II. Initially only used on coinage, the title now appears on several Gibraltar and UK government documents referencing the Queen in relation to Gibraltar.)
Guernsey	6 February 1952 – 8 September 2022	Duke of Normandy	
Isle of Man	6 February 1952 – 8 September 2022	Lord of Mann	
Jersey	6 February 1952 – 8 September 2022	Duke of Normandy	
Nebraska, United States	? – 8 September 2022	Admiral in the Great Navy of the State of Nebraska	
Rhodesia	11 November 1965 – 2 March 1970	Queen of Rhodesia	(Note: Although Elizabeth was recognised as Queen of Rhodesia by the Rhodesian government, she never accepted or exercised the office for the years between the Rhodesian declaration of independence in 1965 and the proclamation of a republic in Rhodesia in 1970.)
Scotland	1 July 1999 – 8 September 2022	Queen of Scots	
Wales	6 August 1946 – 2019	Bard Elizabeth O Windsor	

== Other titles ==
Region	Title	Ref
British Columbia, Canada	Mother of All People	
British Hong Kong	事頭婆 (Note: Pronounced: si tau por) (Cantonese: "Boss Lady")	
Jamaica	Missis Queen (In Jamaican Patois)	
Jamaica	The Queen Lady (In Jamaican Patois)	
Maldives	Raanee (Dhivehi: Queen)	
New Zealand	Te Kotuku Rerengatahi (Māori: Rare White Heron of Single Flight)	
Papua New Guinea	Missis Kwin (Tok Pisin: Mrs Queen)	
Papua New Guinea	Mama Kwin (In Tok Pisin)	
Papua New Guinea	Sina Bada (In Tok Pisin)	
Papua New Guinea	Big Mum (In Tok Pisin)	
Papua New Guinea	Mama belong big family (In Tok Pisin)	
Rhodesia and Nyasaland (Note: Today part of Malawi, Zambia and Zimbabwe.)	Great White Mother of Africa	
Russia	Baba Liza (баба Лиза) (In English: Granny Liz)	
Sierra Leone	Mama Queen II	
Namuga village, Star Harbour, Makira, Solomon Islands	Fau Ni Qweraasi (A title given to a wealthy, powerful, peaceful, and loving female leader, who is capable of resolving disputes)	
South Africa	Motlalepula ("The Rain Queen" or "the one who brings the rain")	
United Kingdom	Princess Auto Mechanic	
United Kingdom	The World's Sweetheart	
United Kingdom	Elizabeth the Great	
Wales	Ein Tywysoges (Welsh: Our Own Princess)	

== Military ranks ==
United Kingdom

- 24 February – 26 July 1945: Hon. Second Subaltern, Auxiliary Territorial Service
- 26 July 1945 – 24 July 1947: Hon. Junior Commander, Auxiliary Territorial Service
- 24 July 1947 – 1 February 1949: Hon. Senior Controller, Auxiliary Territorial Service
- 1 February 1949 – March 1950: Hon. Senior Controller, Women's Royal Army Corps

== Commonwealth of Nations honours ==
=== Commonwealth realms ===
==== Appointments ====
Appointments from Commonwealth realms
Country	Date	Appointment	Ribbon	Post-nominal letters
United Kingdom	1935	Recipient of the Royal Family Order of George V		
United Kingdom	1937	Recipient of the Royal Family Order of George VI		
United Kingdom	11 November 1947 – 6 February 1952	Royal Lady of the Most Noble Order of the Garter		LG
United Kingdom	1952 – 8 September 2022	Sovereign of the Most Noble Order of the Garter		
United Kingdom	12 June 1947 – 6 February 1952	Member of the Imperial Order of the Crown of India		CI
United Kingdom	1952 – 8 September 2022	Sovereign of the Imperial Order of the Crown of India		
United Kingdom	1951 – 6 February 1952	Member of His Majesty's Most Honourable Privy Council		PC
International	8 July 1947 – 6 February 1952	Dame Grand Cross of the Most Venerable Order of the Hospital of St John of Jerusalem		GCStJ
International	6 February 1952 – 8 September 2022	Sovereign Head of the Most Venerable Order of the Hospital of St John of Jerusalem		
Commonwealth realms (Note: Sovereign states within the Commonwealth of Nations sharing the same person as monarch.)	6 February 1952 – 8 September 2022	Sovereign of the Royal Victorian Order		
Commonwealth realms	6 February 1952 – 8 September 2022	Sovereign of the Order of Merit		
Commonwealth realms	6 February 1952 – 8 September 2022	Sovereign of the Order of the Companions of Honour		
United Kingdom	6 February 1952 – 8 September 2022	Sovereign of the Most Ancient and Most Noble Order of the Thistle		
United Kingdom	6 February 1952 – 8 September 2022	Sovereign of the Most Illustrious Order of Saint Patrick		
United Kingdom	6 February 1952 – 8 September 2022	Sovereign of the Most Honourable Order of the Bath		
United Kingdom	6 February 1952 – 8 September 2022	Sovereign of the Most Distinguished Order of Saint Michael and Saint George		
United Kingdom	6 February 1952 – 8 September 2022	Sovereign of the Most Excellent Order of the British Empire		
United Kingdom	6 February 1952 – 8 September 2022	Sovereign of the Distinguished Service Order		
United Kingdom	6 February 1952 – 8 September 2022	Sovereign of the Imperial Service Order		
United Kingdom	6 February 1952 – 8 September 2022	Sovereign of the Most Exalted Order of the Star of India		
United Kingdom	6 February 1952 – 8 September 2022	Sovereign of the Most Eminent Order of the Indian Empire		
United Kingdom	6 February 1952 – 8 September 2022	Sovereign of the Order of British India		
United Kingdom	6 February 1952 – 8 September 2022	Sovereign of the Indian Order of Merit		
United Kingdom	6 February 1952 – 8 September 2022	Sovereign of the Order of Burma		
Canada	1957 – 8 September 2022	Chief Hunter of the Order of the Buffalo Hunt		
Canada	17 April 1967 – 8 September 2022	Sovereign of the Order of Canada		
Canada (British Columbia)	1971	Member of the Order of the Dogwood		
Canada	1 July 1972	Sovereign of the Order of Military Merit		
Australia	14 February 1975 – 8 September 2022	Sovereign Head of the Order of Australia		
New Zealand	13 March 1975 – 8 September 2022	Sovereign Head of the Queen's Service Order		
Barbados	25 July 1980 – 30 November 2021	Sovereign of the Order of Barbados		
Saint Lucia	1980 – 8 September 2022	Sovereign of the Order of Saint Lucia		
Solomon Islands	1981 – 8 September 2022	Sovereign of the Order of the Solomon Islands		
Solomon Islands	1982 – 8 September 2022	Recipient of the Star of the Solomon Islands		
New Zealand	6 February 1987 – 8 September 2022	Sovereign of the Order of New Zealand		
Belize	16 August 1991 – 8 September 2022	Sovereign of the Order of the National Hero		
Belize	16 August 1991 – 8 September 2022	Sovereign of the Order of Belize		
Belize	16 August 1991 – 8 September 2022	Sovereign of the Order of Distinction		
New Zealand	30 May 1996 – 8 September 2022	Sovereign of the New Zealand Order of Merit		
Canada	3 October 2000 – 8 September 2022	Sovereign of the Order of Merit of the Police Forces		
Papua New Guinea	23 August 2005 – 8 September 2022	Sovereign of the Order of Logohu		
Papua New Guinea	2005 – 8 September 2022	Sovereign of the Order of the Star of Melanesia		
Grenada	31 December 2007 - 8 September 2022	Sovereign of the Prestige Order of the National Hero		
Grenada	31 December 2007 - 8 September 2022	Sovereign of the Most Distinguished Order of the Nation (Note: The Order of the Nation is a component order of knighthood within the Order of Grenada, rather than a fully separate order.)		
Grenada	9 December 1994 - 8 September 2022	Sovereign of the Order of Grenada		
Tuvalu	1 October 2016 – 8 September 2022	Sovereign of the Tuvalu Order of Merit		

==== Decorations and medals ====
Decorations and medals from Commonwealth realms (shown in order given not precedence)
Country	Date	Appointment	Ribbon	Post-nominal letters
(United Kingdom) British Commonwealth	1935	Recipient of the King George V Silver Jubilee Medal		
(United Kingdom) British Commonwealth	1937	Recipient of the King George VI Coronation Medal		
United Kingdom	1945	Recipient of the Defence Medal		
United Kingdom	1945	Recipient of the War Medal 1939–1945		
Canada	1951	Recipient of the Canadian Forces' Decoration and five bars		CD
United Kingdom	11 October 2016	Recipient of the Naval Long Service and Good Conduct Medal and five bars		
United Kingdom	11 October 2016	Recipient of the Army Long Service and Good Conduct Medal and five bars		
United Kingdom	11 October 2016	Recipient of the RAF Long Service and Good Conduct Medal and five bars		
(United Kingdom) British Commonwealth	11 March 2020	Recipient of the ULS Extension of the Service Medal of the Order of St John with 3 Gold Bars		

=== Other Commonwealth countries ===
==== Appointments ====
Appointments from other (non-realm) Commonwealth countries
Country	Date	Appointment	Ribbon	Post-nominal letters
Tonga	19 December 1953	Most Illustrious Order of Queen Sālote Tupou III		
Pakistan	1960	Nishan-e-Pakistan		NPk
Nigeria	1969	Grand Commander of the Order of the Niger		GCON
Singapore	1972	Order of Temasek		DUT(1st)
Malaysia	1972	Darjah Utama Seri Mahkota Negara (Kehormat)		DMN
Maldives	1972	Member of the Order of the Ghazi Nishan Ghazige 'Izzatheri Veriya		NGIV
Brunei	1972	Royal Family Order of the Crown of Brunei		DKMB
Kenya	1972	Chief of the Order of the Golden Heart of Kenya		CGH
The Gambia	1974	Grand Commander of the Order of the Republic of The Gambia		GCRG
Malawi	1979	Member First Class of the Order of the Lion		
Botswana	1979	Member of the Presidential Order of Botswana		POB
Nigeria	1989	Grand Commander of the Order of the Federal Republic		GCFR
Malta	28 May 1992	Honorary Companion of Honour of the National Order of Merit		KUOM
Brunei	1992	Royal Family Order of the Crown of Brunei		DKMB
South Africa	1995	Grand Cross in Gold of the Order of Good Hope		
Malta	23 October 2000	Honorary Companion of Honour with Collar of the National Order of Merit		
Malta	23 November 2005	Honorary Member of the Xirka Ġieħ ir-Repubblika		SG
Ghana	2007	Honorary Companion of the Order of the Star of Ghana		CSG
South Africa	2010	Companion in Gold of the Order of the Companions of O. R. Tambo		

==== Decorations and medals ====
Decorations and medals from other (non-realm) Commonwealth countries
Country	Date	Decoration/medal	Ribbon	Post-nominal letters
Dominica	1985	Dominica Award of Honour		DAH
Trinidad and Tobago	1985	Trinity Cross Medal in Gold		TC
Brunei	1992	Sultan of Brunei Silver Jubilee Medal		

== Foreign honours ==
=== Appointments ===
Appointments from non-Commonwealth countries
Country	Date	Appointment	Ribbon	Post-nominal letters
Denmark	1947	Knight of the Order of the Elephant		RE
Egypt	1948	Grand Cordon of the Order of El Kemal		
France	1948	Grand Cross of the National Order of the Legion of Honour		
Nepal	1949	Member of the Order of the Benevolent Ruler		
Netherlands	1950	Knight Grand Cross of the Order of the Netherlands Lion		
Jordan	1953	Collar of the Order of al-Hussein bin Ali		
Sweden	1953	Member of the Royal Order of the Seraphim		LSerafO
Panama	1953	Collar of the Order of Manuel Amador Guerrero		
Libya	1954	Grand Collar of the Order of Idris I		
Ethiopia	1954	Chain and Collar of the Order of the Seal of Solomon		
Norway	1955	Grand Cross with Collar of the Royal Norwegian Order of St. Olav		
Portugal	1955	Sash of the Three Orders (the Grand Crosses of the Order of Christ, the Order of Aviz and the Order of Santiago conferred as a single award)		
Iraq	1956	Member with Chain of the Grand Order of the Hashemites		
Italy	9 May 1958	Knight Grand Cross with Collar of the Order of Merit of the Italian Republic		
Germany	1958	Grand Cross Special Class of the Order of Merit of the Federal Republic of Germany		
Peru	1960	Grand Cross in Diamonds of the Order of the Sun		
Argentina	1960	Grand Collar of the Order of the Liberator General San Martin		
Thailand	1960	Dame of the Most Illustrious Order of the Royal House of Chakri		
Tunisia	1961	Grand Collar of the Order of Independence		
Finland	1961	Collar of the Order of the White Rose		
Mali	1961	Grand Cordon of the National Order of Mali		
Senegal	1961	Grand Cross of the National Order of the Lion		
Liberia	1961	Knight Grand Band of the Order of the Pioneers of Liberia		
Ivory Coast	1961	Grand Cross of the National Order of the Ivory Coast		
Liberia	1962	Knight Grand Band of the Order of the Star of Africa		
Japan	1962	Collar and Grand Cordon of the Order of the Chrysanthemum		
Cameroon	1963	Grand Cross of the Ordre de la Valeur Camerounaise		
Belgium	1963	Grand Cordon of the Order of Leopold		
Greece	1963	Knight Grand Cross of the Order of the Redeemer		GCR
Iceland	1963	Grand Cross with Collar of the Order of the Falcon		
Chile	1965	Grand Collar of the Order of Merit		
Austria	1966	Grand Star of the Decoration of Honour for Services to the Republic of Austria		
Brazil	1968	Grand Collar of the Order of the Southern Cross		
Abu Dhabi	1969	Member First Class of the Order of Al-Nahayyan		
Gabon	1969	Grand Cross of the Order of the Equatorial Star		
Afghanistan	1971	Order of the Supreme Sun		
Luxembourg	1972	Knight of the Order of the Gold Lion of the House of Nassau		
Yugoslavia	1972	Order of the Yugoslav Great Star		
Mexico	1973	Grand Collar of the Order of the Aztec Eagle		
Zaire	1973	Grand Cordon of the National Order of the Leopard		
Indonesia	1974	Star of the Republic of Indonesia, 1st Class		
Egypt	1975	Collar of the Order of the Nile		
Japan	1975	Golden Medal of Merit of Japanese Red Cross		
Japan	1975	Golden Medal of Honorary Member of Japanese Red Cross		
Sweden	1975	Member with Collar of the Royal Order of the Seraphim		LSerafO m kedja
Portugal	1978	Grand Collar of the Order of Saint James of the Sword		GColSE
Romania	1978–1989 (Note: The Queen stripped Romanian dictator Nicolae Ceaușescu, who was overthrown in a popular revolution, of his honorary British knighthood in December 1989, and returned her own order because "of revulsion at the abuse of human rights in Romania for which Ceaușescu is responsible".)	Member First Class of the Order of the Star of the Socialist Republic of Romania		
Liberia	1979	Knight Grand Cordon with Collar of the Order of the Pioneers of Liberia		
Kuwait	1979	Collar of the Order of Mubarak the Great		
Bahrain	1979	Collar of the Order of al-Khalifa		
Oman	1979	Member First Class of the Order of Oman		
Saudi Arabia	1979	Collar of the King Abdulaziz Order of Merit		
Tunisia	1980	Grand Cordon of the Order of the Republic		
Morocco	1980	Collar of the Special Class of the Order of Muhammad		
Oman	1982	Member of the Order of Al Said		
Jordan	1984	Member with Sash of the Order of al-Hussein bin Ali		
Spain	1986	Dame of the Collar of the Royal and Distinguished Spanish Order of Charles III		
South Korea	1986	Member of the Grand Order of Mungunghwa		
Spain	1989	Collar of the Order of the Golden Fleece		
Poland	1991	Grand Ribbon of the Order of Merit of the Republic of Poland		
Hungary	1991	Grand Cross of the Hungarian Order of Merit		
Portugal	1993	Grand Collar of the Military Order of the Tower and of the Sword, of Valour, Loyalty and Merit		GColTE
Colombia	1993	Grand Collar of the Order of Boyaca		
Kuwait	1995	Member Special Class of the Order of Kuwait		
Poland	1996	Knight of the Order of the White Eagle		
Czech Republic	1996	Member First Class with Collar of the Order of the White Lion		
Latvia	1996	Grand Cross with Collar of the Order of the Three Stars		
Peru	1996	Grand Cross of the Order of Merit		
Romania	2000	Member with Sash of the Order of the Star of Romania		
Kazakhstan	2000	Member of the Order of the Golden Eagle		
Slovenia	2001	Golden Order of Freedom of the Republic of Slovenia		
Croatia	12 December 2001	Member with Sash and Grand Star of the Grand Order of King Tomislav		
Lithuania	17 October 2006	Grand Cross with Golden Chain of the Order of Vytautas the Great		
Estonia	19 October 2006	Collar of the Cross of the Order of the Cross of Terra Mariana		
Turkey	14 May 2008	Member First Class of Order of the State of Republic of Turkey		
Slovenia	2008	Order for Exceptional Merits		
Slovakia	2008	Member First Class of the Order of the White Double Cross		
United Arab Emirates	25 November 2010	Collar of the Order of Zayed		
San Marino	11 March 2022	Knight Grand Cross of the Order of San Marino		

=== Dynastic orders ===
Dynastic orders from non-Commonwealth countries
Source	Date	Appointment
Royal House of Mukhrani Georgia	8 March 2017	Grand Collar of the Order of the Eagle of Georgia

=== Decorations ===
Decorations from non-Commonwealth countries
Country	Date	Decoration	Ribbon
Nepal	1961	Mahendra Chain	
Sudan	1964	Chain of Honour	
Saudi Arabia	1979	Badr Chain	
Qatar	1979	Collar of the Independence	
United Arab Emirates	1989	Collar of the Federation	

== Honorary military and police positions ==
Australia

- (Australia) 1953–2022: Captain-General of the Royal Regiment of Australian Artillery
- (Australia) 1953–2022: Colonel-in-Chief of the Royal Australian Engineers
- (Australia) 1953–2022: Colonel-in-Chief of the Royal Australian Infantry Corps
- (Australia) 1953–2022: Colonel-in-Chief of the Royal Australian Army Ordnance Corps
- (Australia) 1953–2022: Colonel-in-Chief of the Royal Australian Army Nursing Corps
- (Australia) 1953–2022: Air-Commodore-in-Chief of the Australian Citizen Air Force

Canada

- (Canada) 1947–2022: Colonel-in-Chief of the Régiment de la Chaudière
- 1947–2022: Colonel-in-Chief of the 48th Highlanders of Canada
- 1950–2022: Colonel-in-Chief of The Argyll and Sutherland Highlanders of Canada (Princess Louise's)
- (Canada) 1952–2022: Captain-General of The Royal Regiment of Canadian Artillery
- (Canada) 1953–2022: Colonel-in-Chief of The Governor General's Horse Guards
- (Canada) 1953–2022: Colonel-in-Chief of The King's Own Calgary Regiment
- (Canada) 1953–1967: Colonel-in-Chief of the Corps of Royal Canadian Engineers
- (Canada) 1953–2022: Colonel-in-Chief of the Royal 22nd Regiment
- (Canada) 1953–2022: Colonel-in-Chief of the Governor General's Foot Guards
- (Canada) 1953–2022: Colonel-in-Chief of The Canadian Grenadier Guards
- (Canada) 1953–1956: Colonel-in-Chief of The Carleton and York Regiment
- (Canada) 1953–2022: Colonel-in-Chief of The Canadian Guards
- (Canada) 1956–2022: Colonel-in-Chief of The Royal New Brunswick Regiment
- (Canada) 1958–1968: Colonel-in-Chief of the Royal Canadian Ordnance Corps
- (Canada) 1977–2022: Colonel-in-Chief of the Military Engineers Branch
- (Canada) 1981–2022: Colonel-in-Chief of The Calgary Highlanders
- (Canada) 2013–2022: Colonel-in-Chief of the Stormont, Dundas and Glengarry Highlanders
- 1953–1968: Air Commodore-in-Chief of the Royal Canadian Air Force Auxiliary
- 1953–2012: Honorary Commissioner of the Royal Canadian Mounted Police
- 2012–2022: Commissioner-in-Chief of the Royal Canadian Mounted Police

Fiji

- 1970–1987: Colonel-in-Chief of the Royal Fiji Military Forces

Ghana

- 1959–1960: Colonel-in-Chief of the Ghana Regiment of Infantry

New Zealand

- 1953–2022: Captain-General of the Royal Regiment of New Zealand Artillery
- 1953–2022: Captain-General of the Royal New Zealand Armoured Corps
- 1953–2022: Colonel-in-Chief of the Corps of Royal New Zealand Engineers
- (New Zealand) 1953–1964: Colonel-in-Chief of the Countess of Ranfurly's Own Auckland Regiment
- (New Zealand) 1953–1964: Colonel-in-Chief of The Wellington Regiment (City of Wellington's Own)
- 1964–2022: Colonel-in-Chief of the Royal New Zealand Infantry Regiment
- 1977–1996: Colonel-in-Chief Royal of The New Zealand Army Ordnance Corps
- 1953–2022: Air-Commodore-in-Chief of the Territorial Air Force of New Zealand

South Africa

- (South Africa) 1947–1961: Colonel-in-Chief of the Royal Durban Light Infantry
- (South Africa) 1947–1961: Colonel-in-Chief of the South African Railways and Harbours Brigade
- (South Africa) 1952–1961: Colonel-in-Chief of the Imperial Light Horse
- (South Africa) 1953–1961: Colonel-in-Chief of the Royal Natal Carbineers
- (South Africa) 1953–1961: Colonel-in-Chief of the Kaffrarian Rifles

United Kingdom

- (United Kingdom) 1942–1952: Colonel of the Grenadier Guards
- (United Kingdom) 1947–2006: Colonel-in-Chief of the Argyll and Sutherland Highlanders (Princess Louise's)
- (United Kingdom) 1947–1993: Colonel-in-Chief of the 16th/5th The Queen's Royal Lancers
- (United Kingdom) 1949–2022: Honorary Brigadier of the Women's Royal Army Corps
- (United Kingdom) 1952–2022: Colonel-in-Chief of The Life Guards
- (United Kingdom) 1952–1969: Colonel-in-Chief of the Royal Horse Guards
- (United Kingdom) 1952–2022: Colonel-in-Chief of the Grenadier Guards
- (United Kingdom) 1952–2022: Colonel-in-Chief of the Coldstream Guards
- (United Kingdom) 1952–2022: Colonel-in-Chief of the Scots Guards
- (United Kingdom) 1952–2022: Colonel-in-Chief of the Irish Guards
- (United Kingdom) 1952–2022: Colonel-in-Chief of the Welsh Guards
- (United Kingdom) 1952–2022: Captain-General of the Royal Regiment of Artillery
- (United Kingdom) 1952–2022: Colonel-in-Chief of the Corps of Royal Engineers
- (United Kingdom) 1952–2022: Captain-General of the Honourable Artillery Company
- (United Kingdom) 1952–2022: Master of the Merchant Navy and Fishing Fleets
- (United Kingdom) 1953–1971: Colonel-in-Chief of the Royal Scots Greys
- (United Kingdom) 1953–2022: Colonel-in-Chief of the Royal Tank Regiment
- (United Kingdom) 1953–2006: Colonel-in-Chief of the Royal Welch Fusiliers
- (United Kingdom) 1953–1970: Colonel-in-Chief of the Loyal Regiment
- (United Kingdom) 1953–1966: Colonel-in-Chief of the King's Royal Rifle Corps
- (United Kingdom) 1953–1956: Colonel-in-Chief of the Royal Army Ordnance Corps
- (United Kingdom) 1953–1956: Honorary Colonel of the Queen's Own Worcestershire Hussars
- (United Kingdom) 1953–2022: Captain-General of the Combined Cadet Force
- (United Kingdom) 1953–1959: Colonel-in-Chief of the Royal West African Frontier Force
- (United Kingdom) 1953–1964: Colonel-in-Chief of the King's African Rifles
- (United Kingdom) 1953–1964: Colonel-in-Chief of the Northern Rhodesia Regiment
- (United Kingdom) 1953–1974: Colonel-in-Chief of the Royal Malta Artillery
- (United Kingdom) 1953–1972: Colonel-in-Chief of the King's Own Malta Regiment
- (United Kingdom) 1953–1970: Colonel-in-Chief of the Royal Rhodesia Regiment
- (United Kingdom) 1953–1992: Colonel-in-Chief of the Duke of Lancaster's Own Yeomanry
- (United Kingdom) 1956–1963: Colonel-in-Chief of the Queen's Own Nigeria Regiment
- (United Kingdom) 1956–2022: Honorary Colonel of the Queen's Own Warwickshire and Worcestershire Yeomanry
- (United Kingdom) 1959–1963: Colonel-in-Chief of the Royal Nigerian Military Forces
- (United Kingdom) 1959–1971: Colonel-in-Chief of the Royal Sierra Leone Military Forces
- (United Kingdom) 1964–2022: Colonel-in-Chief of the Malawi Rifles
- 1 April 1964 – 10 June 2011: Lord High Admiral of the United Kingdom
- (United Kingdom) 1966–2007: Colonel-in-Chief of the Royal Green Jackets
- (United Kingdom) 1969–2022: Colonel-in-Chief of The Blues and Royals (Royal Horse Guards and 1st Dragoons)
- (United Kingdom) 1970–2006: Colonel-in-Chief of The Queen's Lancashire Regiment
- (United Kingdom) 1971–2022: Colonel-in-Chief of the Royal Scots Dragoon Guards
- (United Kingdom) 1971–1999: Colonel-in-Chief of the Queen's Own Yeomanry
- (United Kingdom) 1973–1992: Colonel-in-Chief of the Queen's Own Mercian Yeomanry
- (United Kingdom) 1977–2022: Colonel-in-Chief of the Corps of Royal Military Police
- (United Kingdom) 1992–2022: Patron of the Royal Army Chaplains' Department
- (United Kingdom) 1992–2022: Colonel-in-Chief of the Adjutant General's Corps
- (United Kingdom) 1993–2022: Affiliated Colonel-in-Chief of the Queen's Gurkha Engineers
- (United Kingdom) 1993–2022: Colonel-in-Chief of The Queen's Royal Lancers
- (United Kingdom) 1994–2014: Colonel-in-Chief of The Royal Mercian and Lancastrian Yeomanry
- (United Kingdom) 2006–2022: Colonel-in-Chief of the Royal Welsh
- (United Kingdom) 2006–2022: Colonel-in-Chief of the Royal Regiment of Scotland
- (United Kingdom) 2006–2022: Colonel-in-Chief of the Duke of Lancaster's Regiment
- (United Kingdom) 2006–2022: Royal Colonel of the Argyll and Sutherland Highlanders, 5th Battalion, The Royal Regiment of Scotland
- 1953–1996: Air-Commodore-in-Chief of the Royal Observer Corps
- (United Kingdom) 1953–2022: Air-Commodore-in-Chief of the Royal Auxiliary Air Force
- (United Kingdom) 1953–2022: Air-Commodore-in-Chief of the Royal Air Force Regiment
- (United Kingdom) 1953–2022: Commandant-in-Chief of the Royal Air Force College, Cranwell
- (United Kingdom) 1977–2022: Royal Honorary Air Commodore of the Royal Air Force Marham
- (United Kingdom) 2000–2022: Royal Honorary Air Commodore of the 603 (City of Edinburgh) Squadron
- (United Kingdom) 2014–2022: Lady Sponsor of HMS Queen Elizabeth

== Non-national titles and honours ==
=== Freedom of the City ===
Commonwealth realms

- (United Kingdom) 11 June 1947: London
- (United Kingdom) 5 July 1947: Royal Borough of Windsor and Maidenhead
- (United Kingdom) 16 July 1947: Edinburgh
- (United Kingdom) 20 September 1947: Royal Burgh of Stirling
- (United Kingdom) 27 May 1948: Cardiff
- (United Kingdom) 26 May 1949: Belfast
- (Canada) 10 October 1951: Ottawa

Foreign

- (United States) 1976: Philadelphia
- (United States) 27 February 1983: Long Beach, California
- (Spain) 1988: Madrid

=== Memberships and fellowships ===
Memberships and fellowships
Country	Date	Organisation	Position
United Kingdom	1947–1952	Guild of Air Pilots and Air Navigators	Grand Master
United Kingdom	1947–1952	Royal Society	Fellow (FRS)
United Kingdom	1947–2022	Worshipful Company of Drapers	Freeman (by patrimony, her father (King George VI) being a member)
United Kingdom	1947–2022	Institution of Civil Engineers	Honorary member and patron
United Kingdom	1951–2022	Royal College of Surgeons of England	Honorary fellow (FRCS)
United Kingdom	1951–2022	Royal College of Obstetricians and Gynaecologists	Honorary fellow (FRCOG)
United Kingdom		Honourable Company of Air Pilots	Patron
United Kingdom		Honourable Company of Master Mariners	Patron
United Kingdom		Worshipful Company of Shipwrights	Patron

=== Scholastic ===
==== Degrees ====
Degrees received
Country	Date	University	Degree
United Kingdom	1946	University of London	Bachelor of Music (BMus) honoris causa
United Kingdom	1948	University of Oxford	Doctor of Civil Law (DCL) honoris causa
United Kingdom	1949	University of Wales	Doctor of Music (DMus) honoris causa
United Kingdom	1951	University of Edinburgh	Doctor of Laws (LLD) honoris causa
United Kingdom	1951	University of London	Doctor of Laws (LLD) honoris causa

=== Others ===
She was Time’s Person of the Year for 1952. In 2019 Time created 89 new covers to celebrate women of the year starting from 1920; it chose her for 1953.

In 1975 she received the highest distinction of the Scout Association of Japan, the Golden Pheasant Award.

In April 2013, the Queen was presented with an honorary BAFTA award by Sir Kenneth Branagh in a ceremony at Windsor Castle. The BAFTA was given for her "lifelong support of the British film and television industry".

On 21 June 2022, the Queen was presented with the Canterbury Cross by the Archbishop of Canterbury "for unstinting support of the Church throughout her reign."

She received the International Federation for Equestrian Sports (FEI) Lifetime Achievement Award for her dedication to equestrian sports.

On 14 May 2023, the Queen posthumously won a BAFTA 'Most Memorable Moment Award' as part of her role in 'Paddington meets The Queen from the Platinum Jubilee: Party at the Palace!' via a public vote.

== See also ==
- Style of the British sovereign
- Style and title of the Canadian sovereign
- List of things named after Elizabeth II
- Flags of Elizabeth II
- List of ships christened by Elizabeth II
- List of titles and honours of Prince Philip, Duke of Edinburgh
- List of titles and honours of Charles III
- List of titles and honours of Queen Camilla
- List of titles and honours of Anne, Princess Royal
- List of titles and honours of Prince Edward, Duke of Edinburgh
- List of titles and honours of George VI
- List of titles and honours of Queen Elizabeth the Queen Mother
- List of titles and honours of William, Prince of Wales
- List of titles and honours of Catherine, Princess of Wales
- List of titles and honours of George V
- List of titles and honours of Mary of Teck
- List of titles and honours of Edward VIII
- List of titles and honours of Prince Arthur, Duke of Connaught and Strathearn
