= List of post-nominal letters (Papua New Guinea) =

Papua New Guinea created their own honours system in 2004 with the first investitures being performed by The Princess Royal in September 2005. Papua New Guinea still recognises the Imperial Honours System. Post-nominal letters include:

Office	Post-nominal
Papua New Guinea Honours System
Cross of Valour	CV
Grand Companion of the Order of Logohu	GCL
Companion of the Order of the Star of Melanesia	CSM
Commander of the Order of Logohu	CL
Officer of the Order of Logohu	OL
Member of the Order of Logohu	ML
National Medal of the Order of Logohu	LM
Cross of Medical Service Medal	CMS
Distinguished Military Service Medal	DMS
Distinguished Police Service Medal	DPS
Distinguished Correctional Service Medal	DCS
Meritorious Emergency Service Medal	MES
Meritorious Public Service Medal	MPS
Meritorious Community Service Medal	MCS
Commendation for Valuable Service Medal	CVS

== See also ==
- List of post-nominal letters
