= List of titles and honours of Anne, Princess Royal =

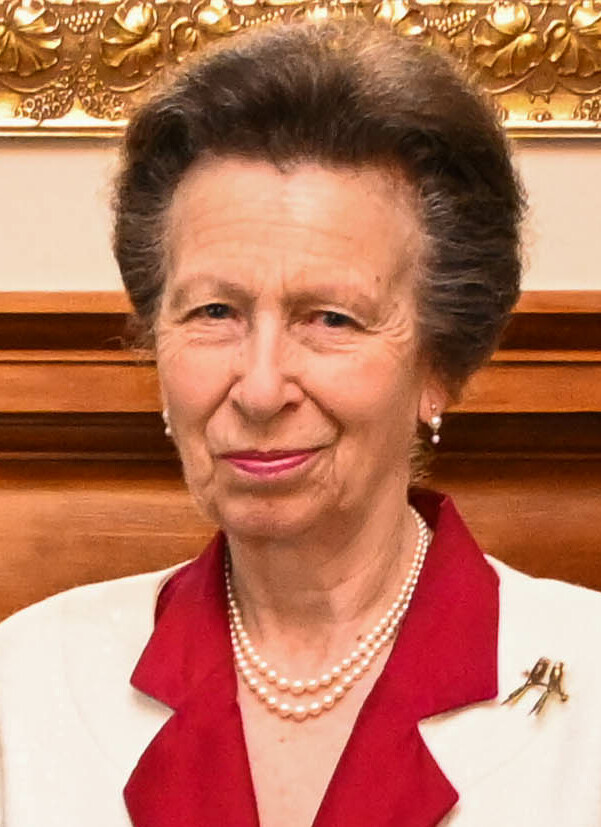
Anne in 2023

Anne, Princess Royal has received numerous titles, decorations, and honorary appointments as a member of the British royal family and the sister of King Charles III of the United Kingdom and the other Commonwealth realms. Each is listed below; where two dates are shown, the first indicates the date of receiving the title or award (the title as Princess Anne of Edinburgh being given as from her birth) and the second indicates the date of its loss or renunciation.

== Royal and noble titles and styles ==
Styles of Anne, Princess Royal
- Reference style: Her Royal Highness
- Spoken style: Your Royal Highness

- 15 August 1950 – 6 February 1952: Her Royal Highness Princess Anne of Edinburgh (Note: As the child of a daughter of the monarch, Anne would not usually have been accorded the title of princess or the style Royal Highness. However, on 22 October 1948, letters patent were issued granting these to any children of Princess Elizabeth and Philip.)
- 6 February 1952 – 15 November 1973: Her Royal Highness The Princess Anne
- 15 November 1973 – 13 June 1987: Her Royal Highness The Princess Anne, Mrs Mark Phillips
- 13 June 1987 – present: Her Royal Highness The Princess Royal

From birth, thanks to letters patent issued by her grandfather George VI on 22 October 1948, Anne was a British princess with the style of Royal Highness and the territorial designation "of Edinburgh". Upon her mother's accession to the throne in 1952, the territorial designation was dropped and she became styled as "The Princess Anne". After she married Captain Mark Phillips in 1973, she was styled as "The Princess Anne, Mrs Mark Phillips" until her mother created her Princess Royal, an appellation given only to the eldest daughter of the sovereign, on 13 June 1987. Anne is the seventh Princess Royal since the title was first granted to Mary, daughter of Charles I. The previous holder was Anne's great-aunt Mary, daughter of George V. As the wife of Vice Admiral Sir Timothy Laurence, she is entitled to use the title of Lady Laurence, because the wife of a knight (Sir) may use the prefect Lady before the Knights surname. However, a princess who has been granted the title of HRH The Princess Royal will not customarily combine it with her style by marriage.

== Military ranks ==
United Kingdom

- (United Kingdom) Royal Navy
  - 1 July 1974: Chief Commandant, Women's Royal Naval Service
  - 1 November 1993: Rear Admiral
  - 1 December 2009: Vice Admiral
  - 15 August 2012: Admiral
- (United Kingdom) British Army
  - 15 August 2020: General
- (United Kingdom) Royal Air Force
  - 15 August 2020: Air Chief Marshal

== Commonwealth honours ==
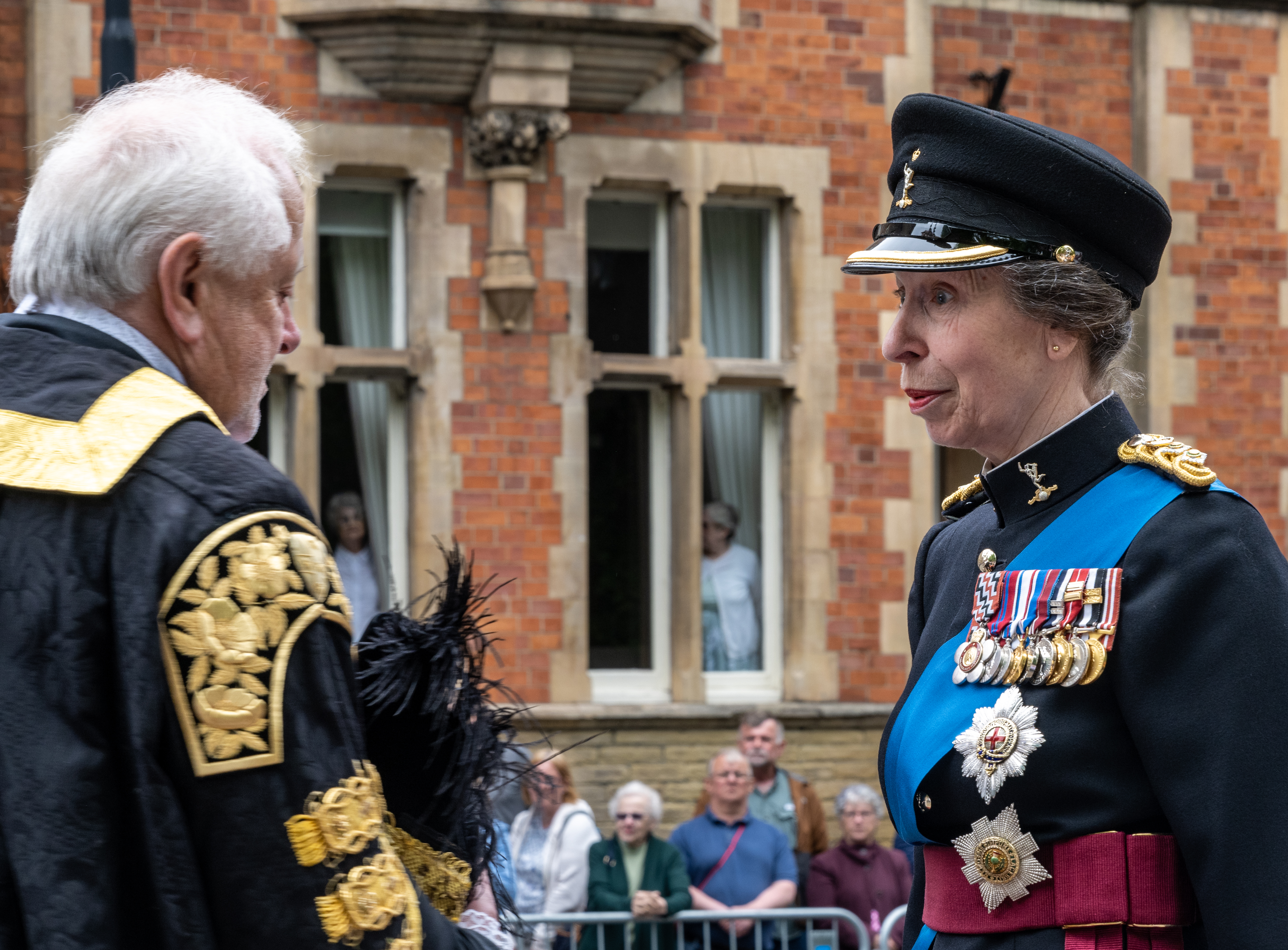
Anne wearing the uniform of Colonel-in-Chief of the Royal Signals, riband and star of the Garter, the star of the Thistle and her medals in York, 2022

Appointments (Shown in order in which appointments were made, not order of precedence)

Country	Date	Appointment	Ribbon	Post-nominal letters
United Kingdom	15 August 1969	Recipient of the Royal Family Order of Elizabeth II		
United Kingdom	25 January 1971	Dame of Justice of the Most Venerable Order of the Hospital of Saint John of Jerusalem		DStJ
United Kingdom	5 May 2009	Dame Grand Cross of the Most Venerable Order of the Hospital of St John of Jerusalem		GCStJ
United Kingdom	15 August 1974	Dame Grand Cross of the Royal Victorian Order		GCVO
United Kingdom	20 April 2007	Grand Master of the Royal Victorian Order		
Singapore	18 February 1972	Distinguished Service Order		DUBC
New Zealand	6 February 1990	Extra Companion of the Queen's Service Order		QSO
England	23 April 1994	Royal Knight Companion of the Most Noble Order of the Garter		KG
Scotland	30 November 2000	Extra Knight of the Most Ancient and Most Noble Order of the Thistle		KT
Papua New Guinea	29 September 2005	Royal Chief Grand Companion of the Order of Logohu		GCL
Canada	12 April 2022	Extraordinary Commander of the Order of Military Merit		CMM
United Kingdom	15 June 2023	Personal Aide-de-Camp to the Sovereign		ADC(P)
United Kingdom	3 December 2024	Recipient of the Royal Family Order of Charles III		

Decorations and medals (Shown in order in which appointments were made, not order of precedence)

Country	Date	Appointment	Ribbon	Post-nominal letters
United Kingdom	2 June 1953	Recipient of the Queen Elizabeth II Coronation Medal		
United Kingdom	6 February 1977	Recipient of the Queen Elizabeth II Silver Jubilee Medal		
Canada	1982	Recipient of the Canadian Forces' Decoration with three clasps		CD
New Zealand	9 February 1990	Recipient of the New Zealand 1990 Commemoration Medal		
United Kingdom	6 February 2002	Recipient of the Queen Elizabeth II Golden Jubilee Medal		
Canada	27 May 2005	Recipient of the Commemorative Medal for the Centennial of Saskatchewan		
United Kingdom	6 February 2012	Recipient of the Queen Elizabeth II Diamond Jubilee Medal		
United Kingdom	11 October 2016	Recipient of the Naval Long Service and Good Conduct Medal with two clasps		
United Kingdom	6 February 2022	Recipient of the Queen Elizabeth II Platinum Jubilee Medal		
United Kingdom	6 May 2023	Recipient of the King Charles III Coronation Medal		
United Kingdom		Recipient of the Service Medal of the Most Venerable Order of the Hospital of Saint John of Jerusalem with two gold bars		

== Foreign honours ==
Appointments (Shown in order in which appointments were made, not order of precedence)

Country	Date	Appointment	Ribbon	Post-nominal letters
Austria	1969	Grand Decoration of Honour for Servies to the Republic of Austria in Gold with Sash		
Finland	1969	Grand Cross of the Order of the White Rose of Finland		
Japan	1971	Paulownia Grand Cordon of the Order of the Precious Crown		
The Netherlands	1972	Knight Grand Cross of the Order of the House of Orange		
Luxembourg	1972	Knight Grand Cross of the Order of the Oak Crown		
Yugoslavia	1972–1992	Order of the Yugoslav Flag with Sash (I rank)		
Spain	2017	Commander by Number of the Royal Order of Isabella the Catholic		CnYC
Madagascar	2017	Grand Cross, 2nd class, of the National Order of Madagascar		
Chile	2021	Grand Cross of the Order of Merit		

Decorations and medals (Shown in order in which appointments were made, not order of precedence)

Country	Date	Appointment	Ribbon
Imperial State of Iran	1971	Commemorative Medal of the 2,500-year celebration of the Persian Empire	

== Wear of orders, decorations, and medals ==
The ribbons worn regularly by Anne in undress uniform are as follows:

Ribbons of the Princess Royal

	Royal Victorian Order	Queen's Service Order	
Order of Military Merit	Order of the Saint John	Queen Elizabeth II; Coronation Medal	Queen Elizabeth II; Silver Jubilee Medal
Queen Elizabeth II; Golden Jubilee Medal	Queen Elizabeth II; Diamond Jubilee Medal	Queen Elizabeth II; Platinum Jubilee Medal	King Charles III; Coronation Medal
Naval Long Service and Good Conduct Medal	Canadian Forces' Decoration with three clasps	Extension of the Service; Medal of the Order of St John	New Zealand 1990; Commemoration Medal

With medals, Anne normally wears the breast stars of the Garter, Thistle, and Royal Victorian Order. When only one should be worn, she wears the Order of the Garter star, except in Scotland where the Order of the Thistle star is worn.

== Honorary military and police appointments ==
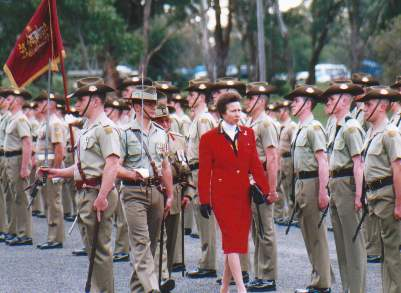
Anne at a parade on the 75th anniversary of the Royal Australian Corps of Signals, 5 July 2000

Australia

- (Australia) 1977– : Colonel-in-Chief of the Royal Australian Corps of Signals
- (Australia) 2011– : Colonel-in-Chief of the Royal Australian Corps of Transport

Canada

- (Canada) 1972– : Colonel-in-Chief of the 8th Canadian Hussars (Princess Louise's)
- (Canada) 1977– : Colonel-in-Chief of the Grey and Simcoe Foresters
- 1977– : Colonel-in-Chief of the Communications and Electronics Branch
- (Canada) 1982– : Colonel-in-Chief of The Royal Regina Rifles
- (Canada) 1987– : Colonel-in-Chief of Royal Newfoundland Regiment
- 2003– : Colonel-in-Chief of the Royal Canadian Medical Service
- (Canada) 2014– : Colonel-in-Chief of the Royal Canadian Hussars
- 2015– : Commodore-in-Chief of the Royal Canadian Navy (Fleet Pacific)
- 2017– : Deputy Commissioner of the Royal Canadian Mounted Police

New Zealand

- 1977– : Colonel-in-Chief of the Royal New Zealand Army Nursing Corps
- 1977– : Colonel-in-Chief of the Royal New Zealand Corps of Signals

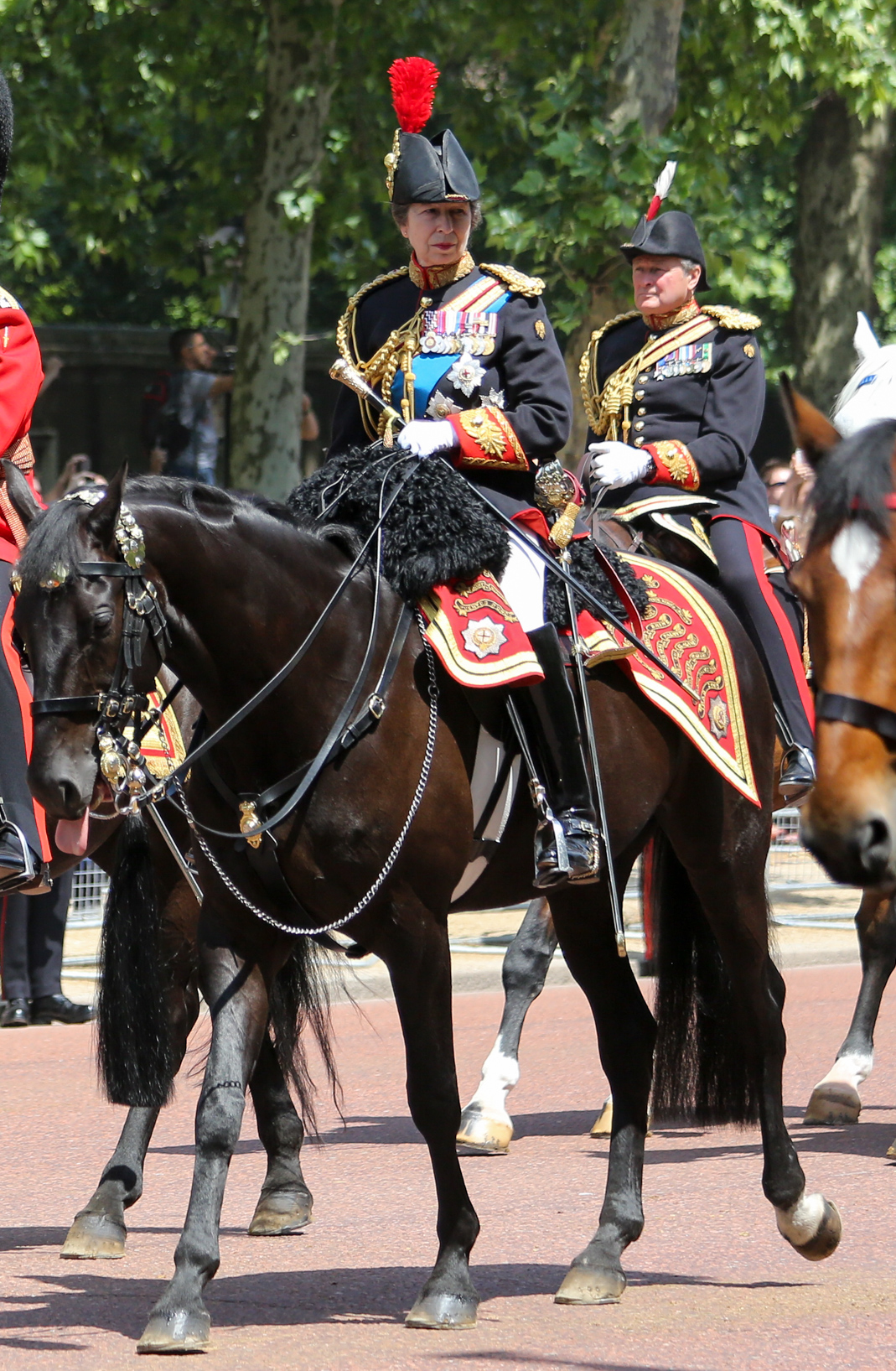
Anne, as colonel of the Blues and Royals, riding in the Trooping the Colour, 2018

United Kingdom

- (United Kingdom) 1969–1992 : Colonel-in-Chief of the 14th/20th King's Hussars
- (United Kingdom) 1970–2007 : Colonel-in-Chief of the Worcestershire and Sherwood Foresters Regiment (29/45 Foot)
- (United Kingdom) 1977– : Colonel-in-Chief of the Royal Corps of Signals
- (United Kingdom) 1981– : Commandant-in-Chief of the First Aid Nursing Yeomanry (Princess Royal's Volunteer Corps)
- (United Kingdom) 1983–2006 : Colonel-in-Chief of The Royal Scots (The Royal Regiment)
- (United Kingdom) 1989– : Royal Honorary Colonel of the University of London OTC
- (United Kingdom) 1992– : Colonel-in-Chief of the King's Royal Hussars
- (United Kingdom) 1992– : Colonel-in-Chief of the Royal Logistic Corps
- (United Kingdom) 1993– : Affiliated Colonel-in-Chief of the Queen's Gurkha Signals
- (United Kingdom) 1993– : Affiliated Colonel-in-Chief of the Queen's Own Gurkha Logistic Regiment
- (United Kingdom) 1998– : Colonel of the Blues and Royals (Royal Horse Guards and 1st Dragoons)
- (United Kingdom) 2003– : Colonel-in-Chief of the Royal Army Veterinary Corps
- (United Kingdom) 2006–2021 : Royal Colonel of the Royal Scots Borderers, 1st Battalion Royal Regiment of Scotland
- (United Kingdom) 2006– : Royal Colonel of the 52nd Lowland, 6th Battalion Royal Regiment of Scotland
- (United Kingdom) 2021– : Colonel-in-Chief of the 1st Battalion Ranger Regiment
- (United Kingdom) 2022– : Colonel-in-Chief of the Intelligence Corps
- (United Kingdom) 2023– : Deputy Colonel-in-Chief of the Royal Regiment of Scotland
- (United Kingdom) Member of the Honourable Artillery Company
- (United Kingdom) 1977–2011: Honorary Air Commodore of RAF Lyneham
- (United Kingdom) 1993– : Honorary Air Commodore of the University of London Air Squadron
- (United Kingdom) 2011– : Honorary Air Commodore of RAF Brize Norton
- (United Kingdom) 1974–1993: Chief Commandant of the Women's Royal Naval Service
- (United Kingdom) 1993– : Chief Commandant for Women in the Royal Navy
- (United Kingdom) 2006– : Commodore-in-Chief of HMNB Portsmouth
- (United Kingdom) 2021– : Admiral of the Sea Cadet Corps
- (United Kingdom) 1988–2022: Lady Sponsor of HMS Talent (S92)
- (United Kingdom) 2001– : Lady Sponsor of HMS Albion (L14)
- (United Kingdom) 2024– : Lady Sponsor of HMS Venturer

== Non-national titles and honours ==
=== Membership, fellowships and presidencies ===
Country	Date	Organisation	Position
United Kingdom	1986	Royal College of Veterinary Surgeons	Fellow (FRCVS)
England	1987	Royal Society of London for Improving Natural Knowledge	Royal Fellow (FRS)
Scotland	1980s	Royal Scottish Geographical Society	Fellow and Vice President (FRSGS)
Scotland	1999	Royal Society of Edinburgh	Honorary Fellow (FRSE)
United Kingdom	2006	Chartered Institution of Highways and Transportation	Honorary Fellow
United Kingdom	2010	Royal Academy of Engineering	Royal Fellow (FREng)
United Kingdom	2011	Royal Society for the Encouragement of Arts, Manufactures and Commerce	President
United Kingdom	2012	Academy of Medical Sciences	Royal Fellow (FMedSci)
England	2017	Royal College of Surgeons of England	Honorary Fellow (FRCS)
United Kingdom	2019	City Literary Institute	Fellow
Canada	2019	Royal Canadian Geographical Society	Honorary Fellow
United Kingdom	2021	Smeatonian Society of Civil Engineers	President

=== Civic ===
Country	Date	Organisation	Position
England	1984–1985	Worshipful Company of Farriers	Master
England		Worshipful Company of Farriers	Honorary Liveryman
England	1986	Worshipful Company of Carmen	Master
England	1992	Worshipful Company of Loriners	Master
England		Worshipful Company of Loriners	Honorary Liveryman
England	1994	Worshipful Company of Woolmen	Master
England	1994	Worshipful Company of Saddlers	Master
England	2014	Worshipful Company of Saddlers	Perpetual Master
England	2001–2002	Worshipful Company of Farmers	Master
England		Worshipful Company of Farmers	Honorary Liveryman
England	2005–2007	Honourable Company of Master Mariners	Master
England	2008–2009	Guild of Freemen of the City of London	Master
England	2010–2011	Worshipful Company of Butchers	Master
England		Worshipful Company of Butchers	Honorary Freeman
England	2017–2018	Worshipful Company of Fishmongers	Prime Warden
England		Worshipful Company of Fishmongers	Freeman
England		City Livery Club	Honorary Member
England		Worshipful Company of Engineers	Liveryman

=== Religious ===
Country	Date	Organisation	Position
Scotland	1996	General Assembly of the Church of Scotland	Lord High Commissioner
Scotland	2017	General Assembly of the Church of Scotland	Lord High Commissioner

=== Academic ===
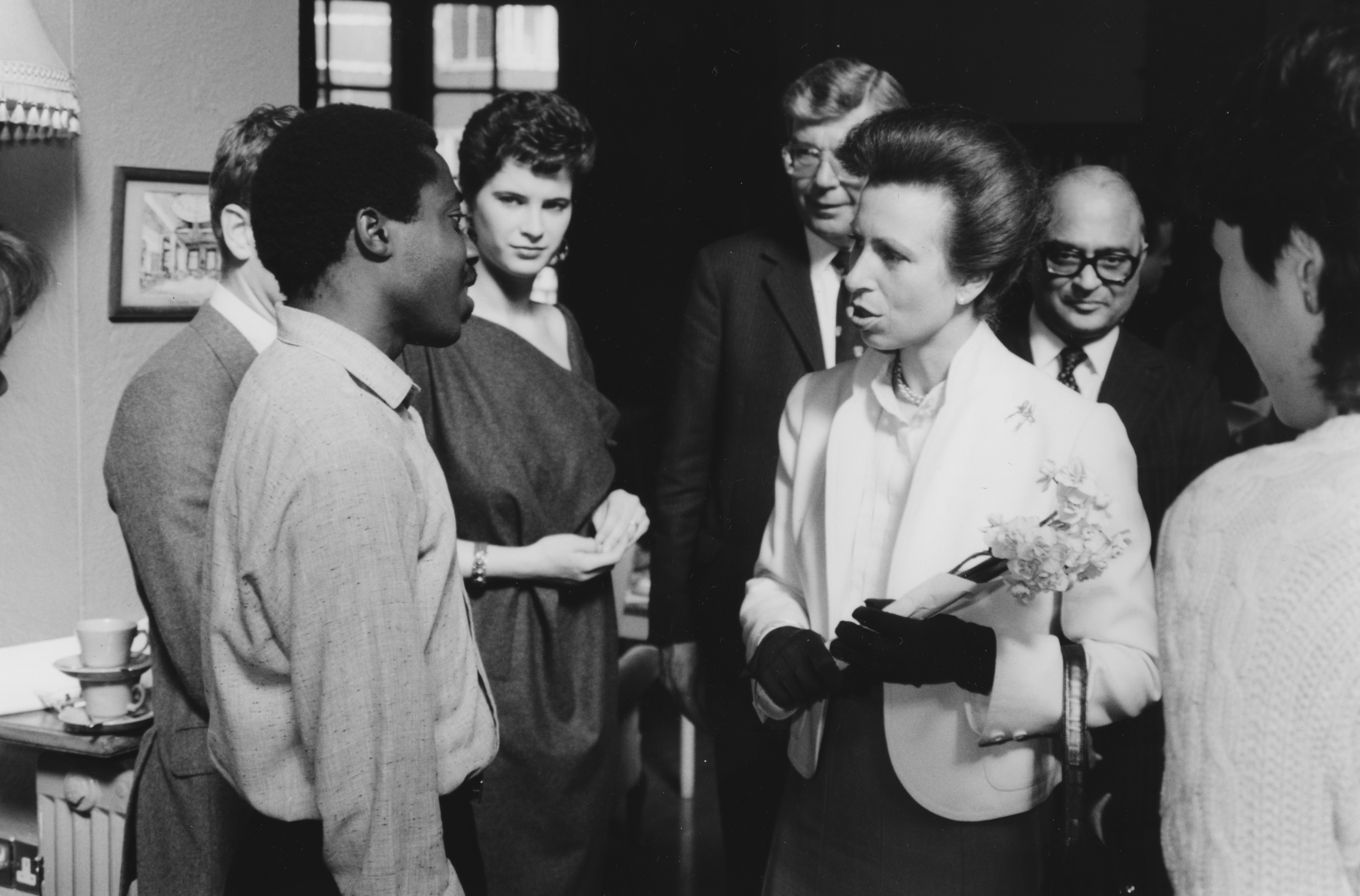
Anne, as chancellor of the University of London, visiting the university, 1986

Country	Date	Institution	Position
England	1981	University of London	Chancellor
Scotland	2011	University of Edinburgh	Chancellor
Scotland	2012	University of the Highlands and Islands	Chancellor
England	2013	Harper Adams University	Chancellor
England	2024	Health Sciences University	Chancellor

=== Honorary academic degrees ===
Country	Date	Institution	Degree
Canada	2004	University of Regina	Doctor of Laws (LLD)
Canada	2010	Memorial University of Newfoundland	Doctor of Laws (LLD)
England	2011	Cranfield University	Doctor of Science (DSc)
Scotland	2020	University of Aberdeen	Doctor of Laws (LLD)

=== Other appointments ===
Country	Date	Organisation	Position
United Kingdom	1971	TS Royalist	Lady Sponsor
Scotland	2015	Royal and Ancient Golf Club of St Andrews	Honorary Member

== Honorific eponyms ==
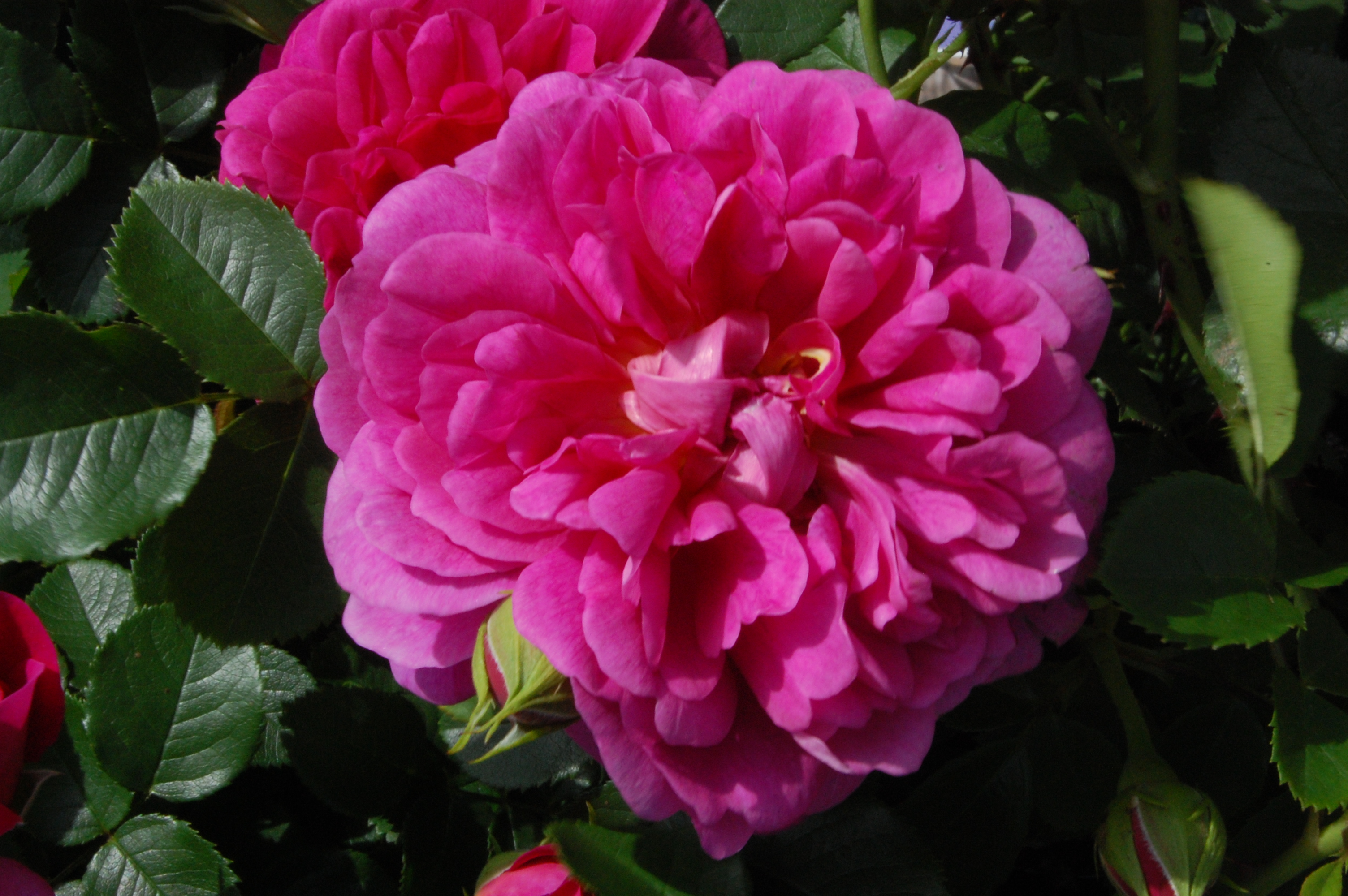
Rosa 'Princess Anne'

=== Awards ===
- United Kingdom: Princess Royal Challenge Cup

=== Buildings ===
- Canada: Princess Anne French Immersion Public School, London, Ontario
- Canada: Princess Anne Public School, Sudbury, Ontario
- Canada: Princess Anne Entrance at Rideau Hall, Ottawa, Ontario
- Canada: Princess Anne Community Centre, South Frontenac, Ontario
- Germany: Princess Royal Barracks, RAF Gütersloh, Gütersloh, Germany
- United Kingdom: Princess Anne Hospital, Southampton, Hampshire, England
- United Kingdom: Princess Royal Hospital, Telford, Shropshire, England

=== Roads ===
- Canada: Princess Anne Manor, Toronto, Ontario
- Canada: Princess Anne Crescent, Etobicoke, Ontario
- Canada: Princess Royal Drive, Mississauga, Ontario
- United Kingdom: Princess Royal Way, Harrogate, North Yorkshire
- South Africa: Princess Anne Ave, Rondebosch, Cape Town

=== Geographical locations ===
- New Zealand: Princess Anne Glacier

=== Miscellaneous ===
- 46202 Princess Anne
- RV The Princess Royal
- Rosa 'Princess Anne'
- Dendrobium Anne

== See also ==
- List of titles and honours of Elizabeth II
- List of titles and honours of Prince Philip, Duke of Edinburgh
- List of titles and honours of Charles III
- List of titles and honours of Queen Camilla
- List of titles and honours of William, Prince of Wales
- List of titles and honours of Catherine, Princess of Wales
- List of titles and honours of Prince Edward, Duke of Edinburgh
- List of titles and honours of George VI
- List of titles and honours of Queen Elizabeth the Queen Mother
- List of titles and honours of George V
- List of titles and honours of Mary of Teck
- List of titles and honours of Edward VIII
- List of titles and honours of Prince Arthur, Duke of Connaught and Strathearn
