= Apetito =

European frozen food company

apetito
- Type: Privately held company
- Industry: institutional & individual catering, meals on wheels, food retailing
- Founded: 1958
- Founder: Karl Düsterberg
- Headquarters: Rheine, Germany
- Products: food
- Revenue: 1.04 billion Euro (2019)
- Number of employees: 11,522 (2019)
- Website: http://www.apetito.com

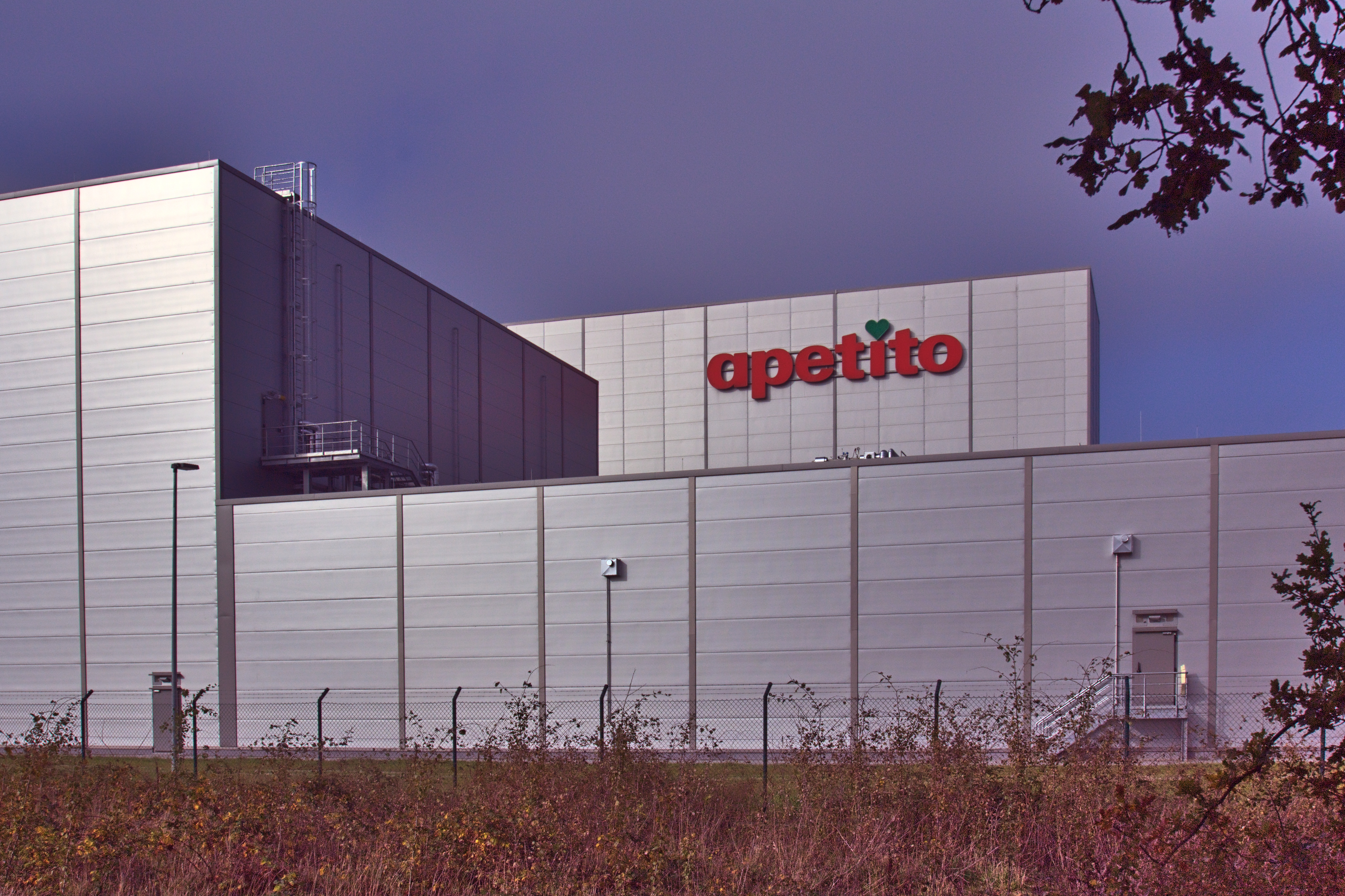
Rheine

apetito is a European frozen food company which was founded in post war Germany. The company operates in Germany, the Netherlands, Austria, Spain, France the United Kingdom, Canada and the United States and employ over 11,522 people. They are the main providers of "meals on wheels" for local authorities in the United Kingdom, and Canada, and were given a Queen's Award for Enterprise in 2005.

== History ==
The company was founded by Karl Düsterberg in 1958 in Rheine, Germany as "apetito Ready Meals" producing frozen ready meals for retail and business canteens, schools, nurseries and the service of Meals on Wheels in Germany. The company began to expand, to Canada in 1987, and to neighbouring countries in Europe in 1989, when "apetito B.V" was founded in the Netherlands.

In 1991, the company set up "apetito (UK) Limited" in Sevenoaks, United Kingdom, and by 2001, had acquired "Nord Restauration S.H." and "Orlysienne du Nord" in France. Business outside of Germany now accounts for approx 25% of apetito's total turnover, though the company's headquarters are still in Rheine, Germany.

== Meals on wheels ==
The meals on wheels schemes organised by local councils in United Kingdom deliver 40 million or 77,000 meals every week to 200,000 people. Of these, apetito produces 900,000 meals and puddings a week or 47 million a year.

== Wiltshire Farm Foods ==
apetito operates a private frozen meal delivery service — Wiltshire Farm Foods. The company, originally named "The Waldens Wiltshire Foods Limited" and based in Trowbridge, was purchased by apetito in November 1995. Wiltshire Farm Foods specialise in delivering frozen ready meals to private customers throughout the United Kingdom.

The company offers over three hundred different ready to reheat frozen meals, including vegetarian, gluten free, and diabetic. The service is intended mainly for elderly or disabled people, but can be used by anybody who prefers to have meals delivered to their home.

Wiltshire Farm Foods deliveries are largely carried out by franchisees.

=== Heart To Home Meals ===
On April 13, 2015, Heart To Home Meals launched as the new company name for apetito's Copper County Foods Division.

=== Copper County Foods ===
Copper County Foods is the Canadian franchise of Wiltshire Farm Foods. It incorporated on June 25, 2008, and commenced selling franchises in June 2009. The Copper County Foods franchise network is in its infancy in Canada, with the market in Ontario currently under development. On April 13, 2015, Copper County Foods rebranded to Heart To Home Meals.

Copper County Foods delivers meals, soups and desserts directly to the home. Their products are developed to cater to special dietary needs and can be ordered online, by phone, or with the delivery driver. Product listings are colour coded and tagged with symbols indicating if a meal is diabetic friendly, low in sodium, fat or calories. They also have meals for diets free of gluten and lactose, as well as pureed and minced meals.

== Advertising ==
apetito's first television marketing campaign started on 6 November 2006, showing commercials on every private television station in Germany. Advertisements in England have also been aired.

== Awards and nominations ==
The company were given a Queen's Award for Enterprise in 2005 for outstanding achievements in innovation in regard to provision of food to the elderly.

They were nominated for two awards in 2008, one for corporate responsibility from ICAEW, the other for business innovation from IMechE. apetito Canada was awarded the Brampton Outstanding Business Achievement Award in 2010, in the category of Food & Beverage.
