= Meals on Wheels =

Charitable organization

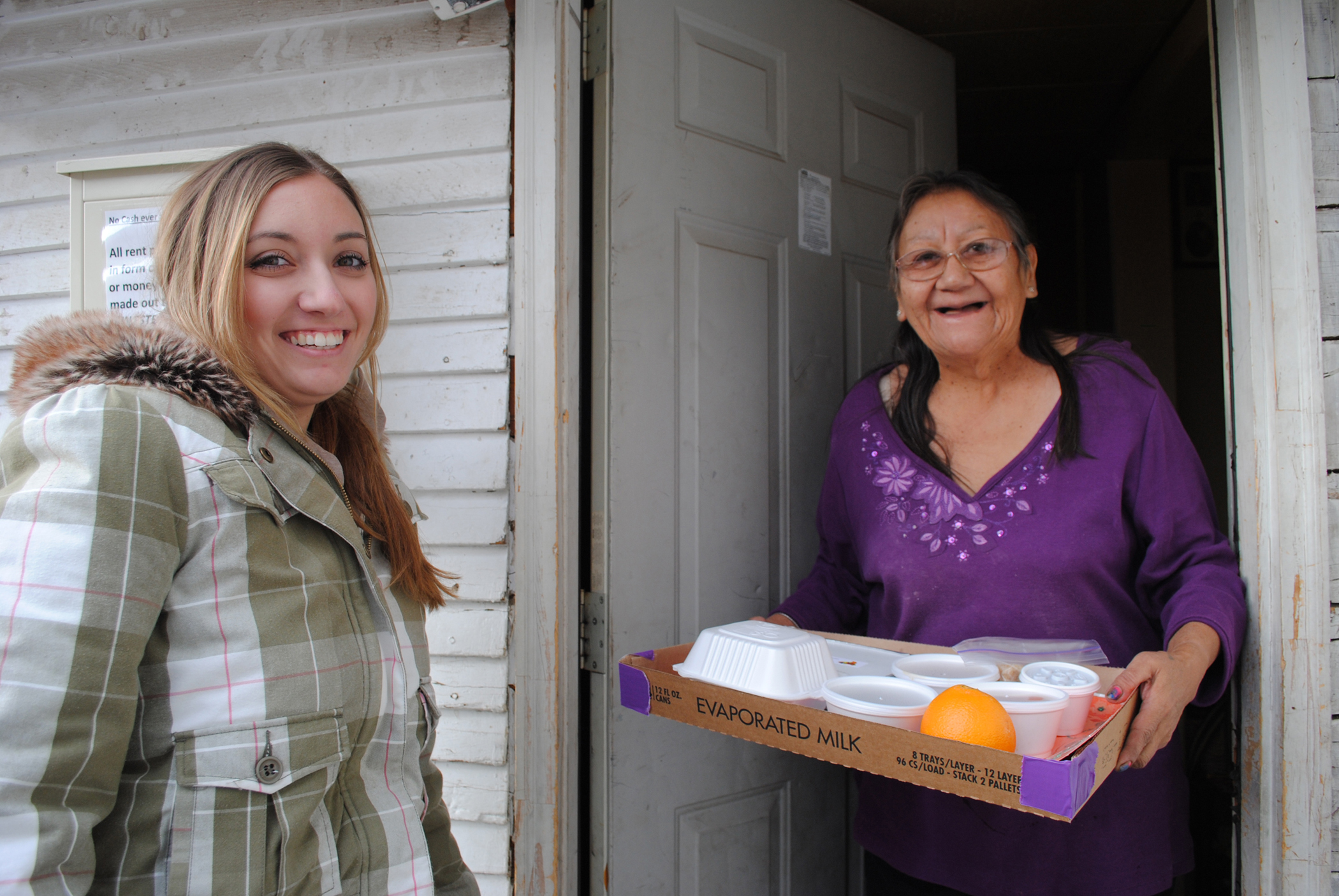
Delivery of Thanksgiving dinner to a Meals on Wheels recipient in Montana, U.S. (2011)

Meals on Wheels is a program that delivers meals to individuals at home who are unable to purchase or prepare their own meals. The name is often used generically to refer to home-delivered meals programs, not all of which are actually named "Meals on Wheels". Many of the housebound recipients are the elderly, and many of the volunteers are also elderly but able-bodied and able to drive automobiles.

Research shows that home-delivered meal programs significantly improve diet quality, reduce food insecurity and improve quality of life among the recipients. The programs also reduce government expenditure by reducing the need of recipients to use hospitals, nursing homes or other expensive community-based services.

== History ==
Meals on Wheels originated in the United Kingdom during the Second World War, when the Blitz destroyed many homes and rendered their residents unable to cook their own food. The Women's Volunteer Service for Civil Defence (WVS, later WRVS) provided food for these people. The name "Meals on Wheels" derived from the delivery method of bringing meals in prams, carts, bicycles with basket, cars and other wheeled vehicles. The concept of delivering meals to those unable to prepare their own evolved into the modern programmes that deliver mostly to the housebound elderly, sometimes free, or at a small charge.

=== United Kingdom (1943) ===
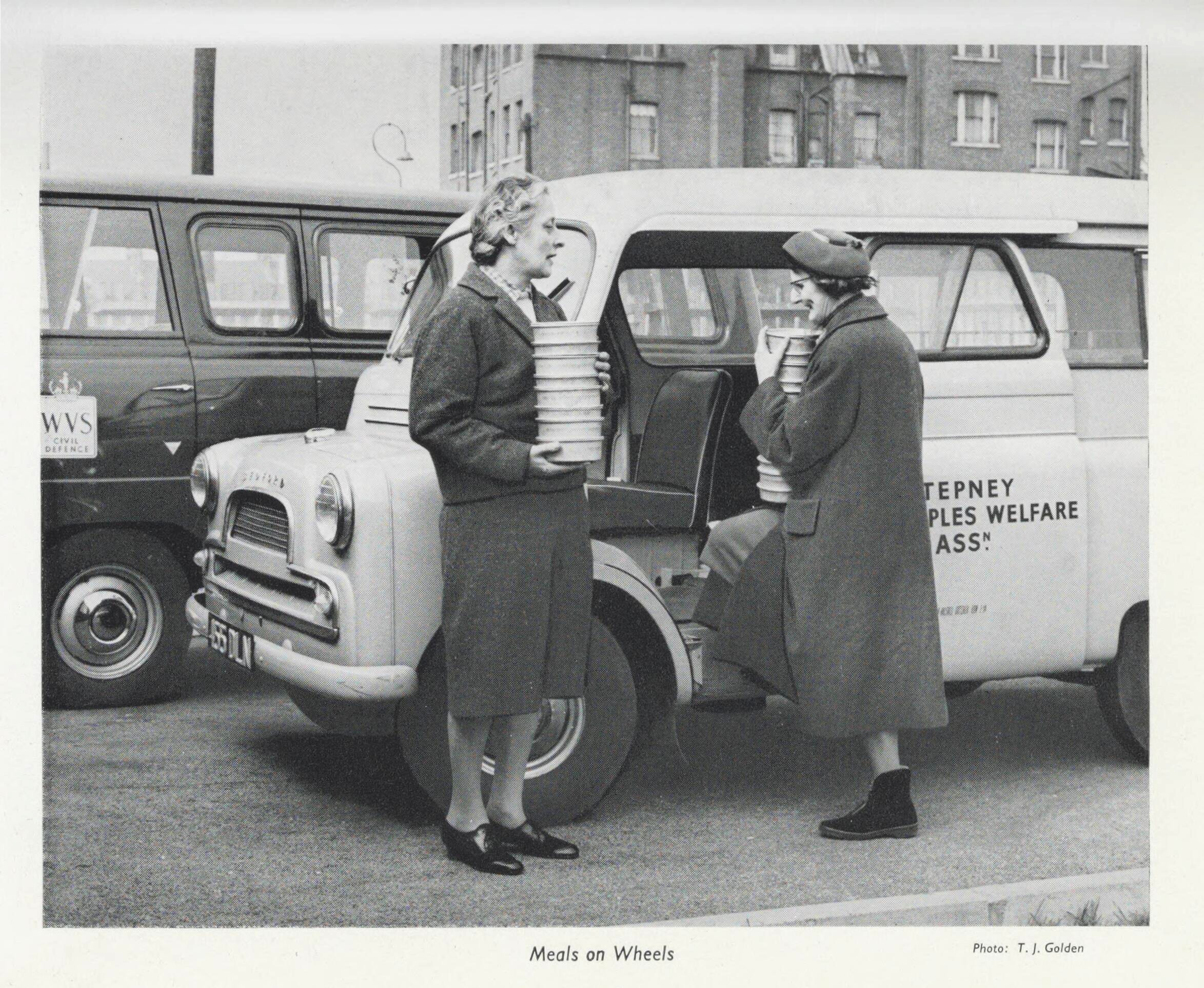
Meals on Wheels delivery in Stepney, London

The first home delivery of a meal on wheels took place during World War II and was made by the WVS in Hemel Hempstead, Hertfordshire, England in 1943. Many early services used old prams to transport the meals, using straw bales, and even old felt hats, to keep the meals warm in transit.

This type of service requires many volunteers with an adequate knowledge of basic cooking to prepare the meals by a set time each day. The majority of local authorities in the United Kingdom have now moved away from freshly cooked food delivery, and towards the supply of frozen pre-cooked reheatable meals.

One of the pioneers of meals on wheels was said to be Harbans Lall Gulati, a general practitioner from Battersea, according to his obituary in the British Medical Journal. However, this is disputed, as there is little evidence.

=== Australia (1953) ===
In Victoria, the City of South Melbourne Town Clerk, Harold Alexander, a former footballer, is attributed with starting the first Australian meals on wheels service in June 1953. Doris Irene Taylor MBE founded Meals on Wheels in South Australia in 1953, and in 1954 the first meal was served from the Port Adelaide kitchen. In New South Wales, Meals on Wheels was started in March 1957 by the Sydney City Council. In the first week, 150 meals were served for inner-city dwellers; these were cooked in the Sydney Town Hall kitchen.

Organised on a regional basis, in Australia Meals on Wheels is a well established, active and thriving group of organisations. The history of a small sample of some of the organisations includes: New South Wales, Queensland, South Australia, Victoria, and Western Australia. In 2012, the Queensland branch of Meals on Wheels was a recipient of the Queensland Greats Awards. In 1989, the various state services merged into a national organisation, Meals on Wheels Australia.

=== Canada (1963) ===
The Red Cross Meals on Wheels program began in 1963, after Brantford, Ontario, resident Elsie Matthews approached her local Red Cross with the idea. Elsie had witnessed a programme while travelling in England, where nutritious meals were delivered to seniors in their homes, and she believed a similar programme would be a great value to her community. In its first year, the programme had 12 clients per week who had meals delivered to them.

Brampton, Ontario, also began to deliver meals to seniors in need. In the spring of 1963, Ruby Cuthbert, a nurse, implemented the Meals on Wheels programme with the support of the local Soroptimist Club. Later, the Auxiliary group from Peel Memorial Hospital took over the responsibility and Brampton Meals on Wheels (BMOW) started with six meals a day.

In January 1966, women from the St. Matthias Church started the service in Westmount, Quebec, and the idea spread to other communities in Montreal. Each group had to find money to buy food and sufficient volunteers to prepare and deliver the meals. {citation needed} In 1970, Inez Webster established a Meals on Wheels program in Montreal West operating out of the United Church. The program relied on 100 to 150 volunteers a year to deliver hot meals twice a week to seniors living alone and on fixed incomes. Another program was established in Dorval-Lachine around the same time.

The True Davidson Meals on Wheels programme was established in East Toronto in 1973, named after the beloved local politician who was the first mayor of East York, Ontario. In May 2014, this programme merged with local agency Neighbourhood Link Support Services and continues to the present day.

=== Ireland (1971) ===
The first meals were delivered in Longford, a small county town in the Midlands. They were delivered by County Longford Social Services, organised by Sister Calasanctius of the local Convent of Mercy and the local hospital's medical officer Dr Gerard McDonagh. The meals were distributed from a mobile kitchen for which funds had been raised by the local children. The fundraising had been organised by the Longford News (local newspaper) editor Derek Cobbe.

Some of the first meals were delivered by a volunteer driver, the late Pat Hourican, with volunteer helper the late Sr. Bonaventure. The mobile kitchens were built by a local businessman, Noel Hanlon, at his ambulance factory in the town. The vans had specially fitted gas cookers provided by the ambulance factory to keep the dinners warm. Meals were delivered then to some 400 people around Longford, mostly elderly or disabled, and were free of charge, supported by small grants and locally collected funds.

== Modern programs ==
Today, Meals on Wheels programs generally operate at the county level or smaller. Programs vary widely in their size, service provided, organization, and funding.

There are Meals on Wheels programs in Australia, Canada, Ireland, the United Kingdom and the United States. The National Association of Care Catering are a great source of information on UK Meals on Wheels services. The Meals On Wheels Association of America (MOWAA) is a national association for senior nutrition programmes headquartered in Alexandria, Virginia, but each programme operates independently.

Most Meals on Wheels programs deliver meals hot and ready-to-eat, but some deliver cold meals in containers ready to microwave. Others supply deep-frozen meals. Some warm-meal programmes provide an additional frozen meal during the days prior to a weekend or holiday, when there would be no delivery. Depending on the programme, meals may be delivered by paid drivers or by volunteers. In addition to providing nutrition to sustain the health of a client, a meal delivery by a Meals on Wheels driver or volunteer also serves as a safety check and a source of companionship for the client.

Most clients of Meals on Wheels programmes are elderly, but others who are unable to shop or cook for themselves (as well as their pets) are generally eligible for assistance. In the United States, there is a MOW programme called "supplemental" for homebound clients under 60 years old. This requires a signed note from a doctor and there is a small fee of $2 per meal. Regardless of their sources of funding, eligibility for most programmes is determined by the client's ability to have access to good nutrition not financial need.

=== United Kingdom ===
In the county of Suffolk, the programme is referred to as "Community Meals". "Meals on Wheels" services are provided for those who have been assessed to have difficulty cooking for themselves. Community Meals services can comprise daily hot meals, chilled meals or a weekly or fortnightly delivery of frozen meals. Traditional hot deliveries are cooked in a central kitchen then transported to the service user. The service in Suffolk is now run by Aspect Living Foundation, a not-for-profit charity trading as Meals on Wheels Suffolk, set up and registered in 2018 to take over "Meals on Wheels" from the Royal Voluntary Service, and set up specifically for this purpose.

Support to the elderly is also provided by the Royal Voluntary Service (formerly named Women's Royal Voluntary Service).

National Association of Care Catering Community Meals Week is a national event aiming to increase visibility of Community Meals Services. In October 2008, Camilla, Duchess of Cornwall assisted in Meals on Wheels Week activities.

Increasingly in the United Kingdom, commercial rather than voluntary or local authorities organisations are providing the meals. For example, some Local Authorities have stopped providing hot meals and are instead delivering frozen pre-cooked meals. Other variations include using Apetito, who operate a "Chefmobil" service which regenerates meals en route, and Apetito subsidiary Wiltshire Farm Foods, which operates a Meals on Wheels alternative service for those who do not meet assessment criteria. In 2018, Meals On Wheels was completely withdrawn in the United Kingdom. Wiltshire Farms frozen meals and private hot meal schemes largely on a commercial basis do however remain.

Wolverhampton Council took a different approach: instead of closing the service, it has been expanded so anyone living in the city can order meals on wheels. People may opt to receive a meal one day a week, every day or for a fixed length of time e.g. after an operation. Alongside the hot meal a cold 'tea' consisting of a sandwich and fruit can be delivered.

October 2011 saw a Hairy Bikers series, Meals on Wheels, air on BBC Two. The series fronted a campaign with BBC Learning to save local 'meals on wheels' services around the United Kingdom.

=== Canada ===
Halifax Meals on Wheels in Nova Scotia currently operate 68 programmes across the province; more than 600 volunteers serve an estimated 3400 meals a week. In Halifax, the service is partially funded by the municipality. The United Way also provides funding, depending on how much the programmes need. Organizations such as nursing homes and hospitals provide many of the meals; others come from restaurants and private homes. The programme isn't just for the elderly; people of any age who live alone often call when they're recovering after a recent hospital stay and are unable to cook for themselves. Other users of Meals on Wheels are people with disabilities such as multiple sclerosis who use the programme to help them through a rough time when cooking becomes too difficult. In 1996, 56.7% of clients in Halifax used the service for less than three months.

In 2020, Halal Meals on Wheels was created by East York Meals on Wheels, an independent charity, as a response to providing culturally appropriate meals to Toronto's East York community. This program was funded by the United Way of Greater Toronto, and has gained traction across the city's east-end.

There are dozens of independent meals on wheels in Montreal, one of the largest and most innovative is the unique intergenerational Santropol Roulant, an organisation operated mainly by young volunteers in central Montreal neighbourhoods. Deliveries are done on foot, by bicycle and by hybrid car in some outlying routes.

=== Ireland ===
==== Longford ====
Currently (2016) vans are still used to deliver meals around Longford by County Longford Social Services, a registered charity - 4 vans deliver to all areas of County Longford, but the meals are now hot soup and chilled main course and dessert - recipients have microwave ovens for reheating the dinners. Meals are provided 7 days per week, 365 days per year.

==== Other areas ====
A study by Trinity College Dublin published in 2008 on behalf of the National Council on Ageing and Older People found most of Ireland served by Meals on Wheels services (or centre-based alternatives) since the 1980s, over half being registered charities. Half of the services are noted to be parish-only, with many more serving a slightly larger area: the report notes only 5% of providers serve "a significant proportion of their county" (but they do not mention the longest-running service in Longford, which serves the whole county).

=== United States ===
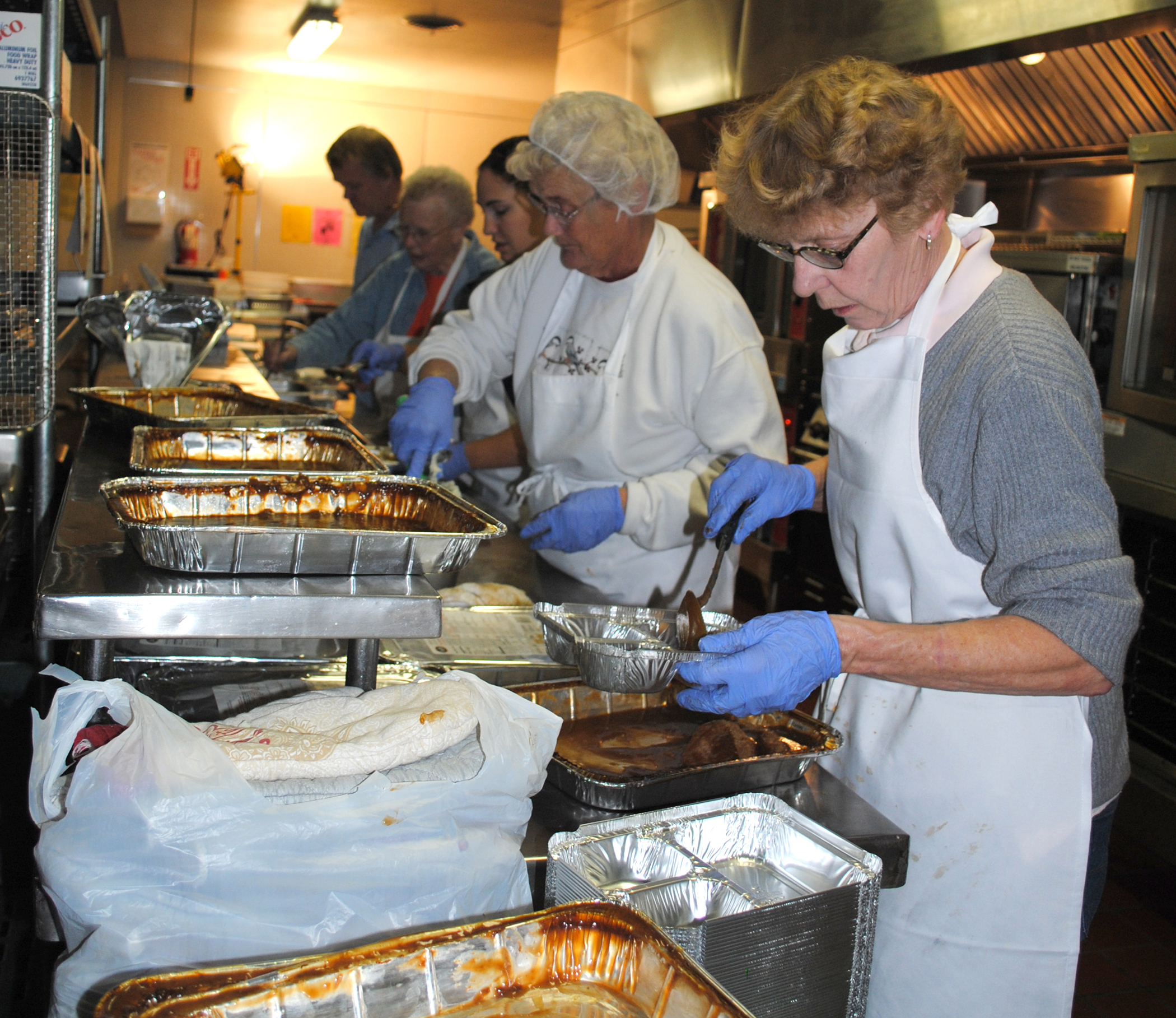
Food prep at the Great Falls Community Food Bank

The first such program in the United States was started by social worker Margaret Toy in 1954 at the request of the Philadelphia Health & Welfare Council. It was funded by the Henrietta Tower Wurtz Foundation.

The Meals on Wheels Association of America (MOWAA) is headquartered in Alexandria, Virginia. MOWAA is the oldest and largest organization in the United States representing those who provide meal services to seniors in need, specifically those at risk of or experiencing hunger. MOWAA is a nonprofit organization working toward the social, physical, nutritional and economic betterment of vulnerable Americans by providing the tools and information its programmes need to make a difference in the lives of others. In 2016, Meals on Wheels provided approximately 218 million meals to 2.5 million Americans. The annual meal cost is $2,765 per recipient. Approximately 500,000 of the recipients are veterans.

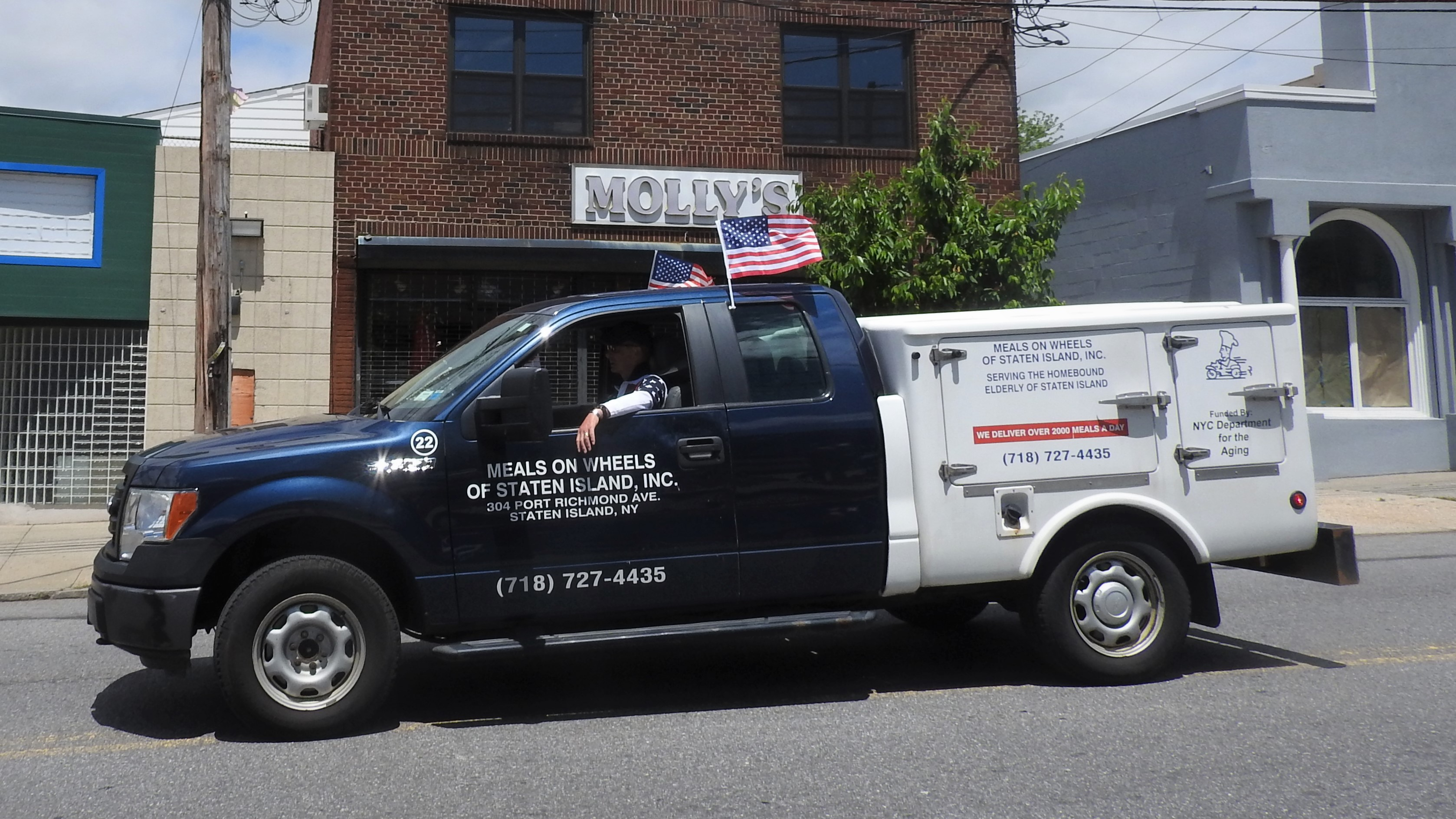
Truck in a parade in Staten Island

Citymeals-on-Wheels serves the New York City area. In 2008, Citymeals delivered over 2.1 million meals to 17,713 frail aged in every borough of New York City. In addition, over 1,500 volunteers collectively spent 62,000 hours visiting and delivering meals to New York's frail aged. Gael Greene and James Beard founded Citymeals-on-Wheels in 1981 after reading a newspaper article about homebound elderly New Yorkers with nothing to eat on weekends and holidays. They rallied their friends in the restaurant community, raising private funds as a supplement to the government-funded weekday meal delivery programme. Twenty five years ago, their first efforts brought a Christmas meal to 6,000 frail aged.

In 2007, the MOWAA Foundation commissioned a study on hunger (see next section). In 2009, MOWAA partnered with The Mission Continues, an organization which addresses the needs of veterans who have served the United States.

Specialty Meals on Wheels programmes, such as "Kosher Meals on Wheels", also exist to service niche clientele.

==== MOWAAF study on hunger ====
The Meals On Wheels Association of America Foundation (MOWAAF), recognizing that hunger is a serious threat facing millions of seniors in the United States, determined that understanding of the problem is a critical first step to developing remedies. In 2007, MOWAAF, underwritten by the Harrah's Foundation, commissioned a research study entitled The Causes, Consequences and Future of Senior Hunger in America. The report was released at a hearing of the United States Senate Special Committee on Aging in March 2008 in Washington, D.C.

The study found that in the United States, over 5 million seniors, (11.4% of all seniors), experience some form of food insecurity, i.e. were marginally food insecure. Of these, about 2.5 million are at-risk of hunger, and about 750,000 suffer from hunger due to financial constraints. Some groups of seniors are more likely to be at-risk of hunger. Relative to their representation in the overall senior population, those with limited incomes, under age 70, African Americans, Hispanics, never-married individuals, renters, and persons living in the southern United States are all more likely to be at-risk of hunger. While certain groups of seniors are at greater-risk of hunger, hunger cuts across the income spectrum. For example, over 50% of all seniors who are at-risk of hunger have incomes above the poverty threshold. Likewise, it is present in all demographic groups. For example, over two-thirds of seniors at-risk of hunger are caucasian. There are marked differences in the risk of hunger across family structure, especially for those seniors living alone, or those living with a grandchild. Those living alone are twice as likely to experience hunger compared to married seniors. One in five senior households with a grandchild, but no adult child, present is at risk of hunger, compared to about one in twenty households without a grandchild present. Seniors living in non-metropolitan areas are as likely to experience food insecurity as those living in metropolitan areas, suggesting that food insecurity cuts across the urban-rural continuum.

==== 2017 proposed budget cuts ====
In March 2017, President Donald Trump's proposed budget would make cuts to block grants that go towards spending on Meals on Wheels. Defending these cuts, director of the Office of Management and Budget Mick Mulvaney said that "Meals on Wheels sounds great" but that the program is one of many that is "just not showing any results."

== Impact ==
A 2013 review study on the impact of home-delivered meal programs found that "all but two studies found home-delivered meal programs to significantly improve diet quality, increase nutrient intakes, and reduce food insecurity and nutritional risk among participants. Other beneficial outcomes include increased socialization opportunities, improvement in dietary adherence, and higher quality of life." The study concluded, "Home-delivered meal programs improve diet quality and increase nutrient intakes among participants. These programs are also aligned with the federal cost-containment policy to rebalance long-term care away from nursing homes to home- and community-based services by helping older adults maintain independence and remain in their homes and communities as their health and functioning decline."

== See also ==
- Food choice of older adults
- Meals on Wheels Association of America
