= National Association of Care Catering =

British trade association

The National Association of Care Catering is a trade association for catering in the British care sector. It is an unincorporated voluntary association based in offices in Faygate.

Neel Radia, is currently the National Chairman of The National Association of Care Catering (NACC)Elizabeth Barker, Baroness Barker is the national patron of the association.

It runs an annual Meals on Wheels Week in November each year which is intended to show how meals on wheels services can prevent malnutrition and reduce isolation, particularly among elderly people, and an annual award ceremony. This includes Care Chef of the Year, awarded after a competition. Competitors have to create a two-course meal (main and dessert) suitable for service users in a care setting. The combined ingredient cost must be no more than £2.25 per head and it has to be nutritionally balanced.

In 2017 the association published a guide for members about the Care Quality Commission's fundamental standards, focussing on the role of good nutrition and hydration in quality care and the records, observations and statements that inspectors look for during an inspection.

It was one of the supporters of an open letter to Theresa May in 2019 warning that a no-deal Brexit would threaten the viability of food banks.
