= Order of the Star of Melanesia =

Order of the Star of Melanesia is a Papua New Guinean long service medal founded on September 16, 2005. It is awarded inspiring and outstanding merits for Papua New Guinea or Oceania, in particular Melanesia. Also, more modest but longstanding merits of at least 15 years count as merits.

The order in conferred in a single class:

- companion

Within the hierarchy of the orders, decorations and medals of Papua New Guinea, the order of the Star of Melanesia is lower than the Grand Companion of the order of Logohu but higher than its other grades.
