= List of titles and honours of William, Prince of Wales =

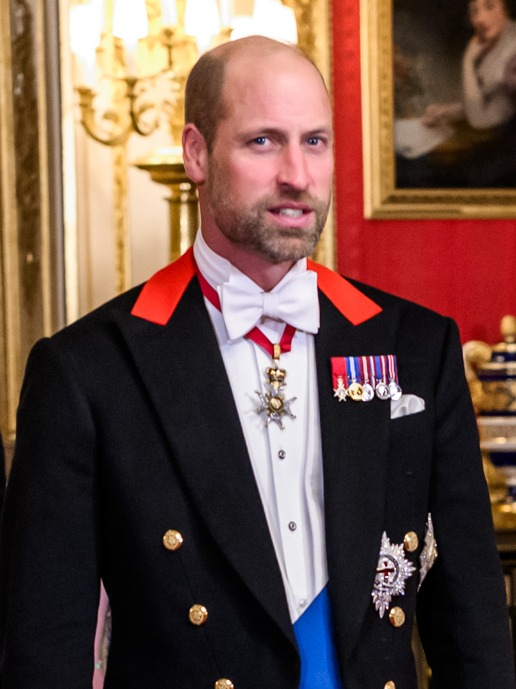
William in 2025

William, Prince of Wales has received numerous titles, decorations and honorary appointments both during his time as Duke of Cambridge and Prince of Wales. Each is listed below; where two dates are shown, the former indicates the date of receiving the title or award (the title as Prince William of Wales being given as from his birth) and the latter indicates the date of its loss or renunciation.

== Royal and noble titles and styles ==
Badge of the Prince of Wales

William has been a British prince since birth, and was known as "Prince William of Wales" until 2011. On his wedding day, 29 April 2011, his grandmother Elizabeth II created him Duke of Cambridge, Earl of Strathearn and Baron Carrickfergus. The letters patent granting these titles were issued on 26 May that year.

As the eldest son of the monarch, William automatically became Duke of Cornwall, Duke of Rothesay, Earl of Carrick, Baron of Renfrew, Lord of the Isles, and Prince and Great Steward of Scotland on the accession of his father on 8 September 2022. From 8 to 9 September, William was styled as "His Royal Highness The Duke of Cornwall and Cambridge". On 9 September, Charles III announced the creation of William as Prince of Wales. William has since been known as "His Royal Highness The Prince of Wales", except in Scotland where he has been styled as "His Royal Highness The Duke of Rothesay". The letters patent formally granting him this titles of Prince of Wales and Earl of Chester were issued on 13 February 2023. The usage of the title Prince of Wales has been subject to some controversy over the past decades, primarily from Welsh nationalists.

Titles of The Prince William
Title	From	
Title	Date	Reason
Duke of Cambridge	29 April 2011	Granted on the occasion of his wedding
Earl of Strathearn	29 April 2011	Granted on the occasion of his wedding
Baron Carrickfergus	29 April 2011	Granted on the occasion of his wedding
Duke of Cornwall	8 September 2022	His father's accession (automatically)
Duke of Rothesay	8 September 2022	His father's accession (automatically)
Earl of Carrick	8 September 2022	His father's accession (automatically)
Baron of Renfrew	8 September 2022	His father's accession (automatically)
Lord of the Isles	8 September 2022	His father's accession (automatically)
Prince and Great Steward of Scotland	8 September 2022	His father's accession (automatically)
Prince of Wales	9 September 2022 (announced); 13 February 2023 (gazetted)	Granted to the heir apparent
Earl of Chester	13 February 2023 (gazetted)	Granted to the heir apparent

=== Surname ===
As a British prince, William does not use a surname for everyday purposes. For formal and ceremonial purposes, children of the Prince of Wales use the title "prince" or "princess" before their forename and follow it with their father's territorial designation. Thus, before becoming a duke when he married, Prince William was styled "Prince William of Wales". Such territorial designations are discarded by women when they marry and by men if they become peers in their own right, such as when Prince William was made a duke.

Although the name of the royal house is Windsor, the surname Mountbatten-Windsor belongs to all the children and male-line descendants of Queen Elizabeth II and Prince Philip, and is used, if needed, by those who do not have the style of Royal Highness and the title Prince or Princess; when a female descendant marries, she traditionally takes her husband's surname from that point onward, and their children take their father's. Both Princes William and Harry used Wales as their surname for military purposes; this continued to be the case for William after his creation as Duke of Cambridge.

== Military ranks and appointments ==
=== Ranks ===
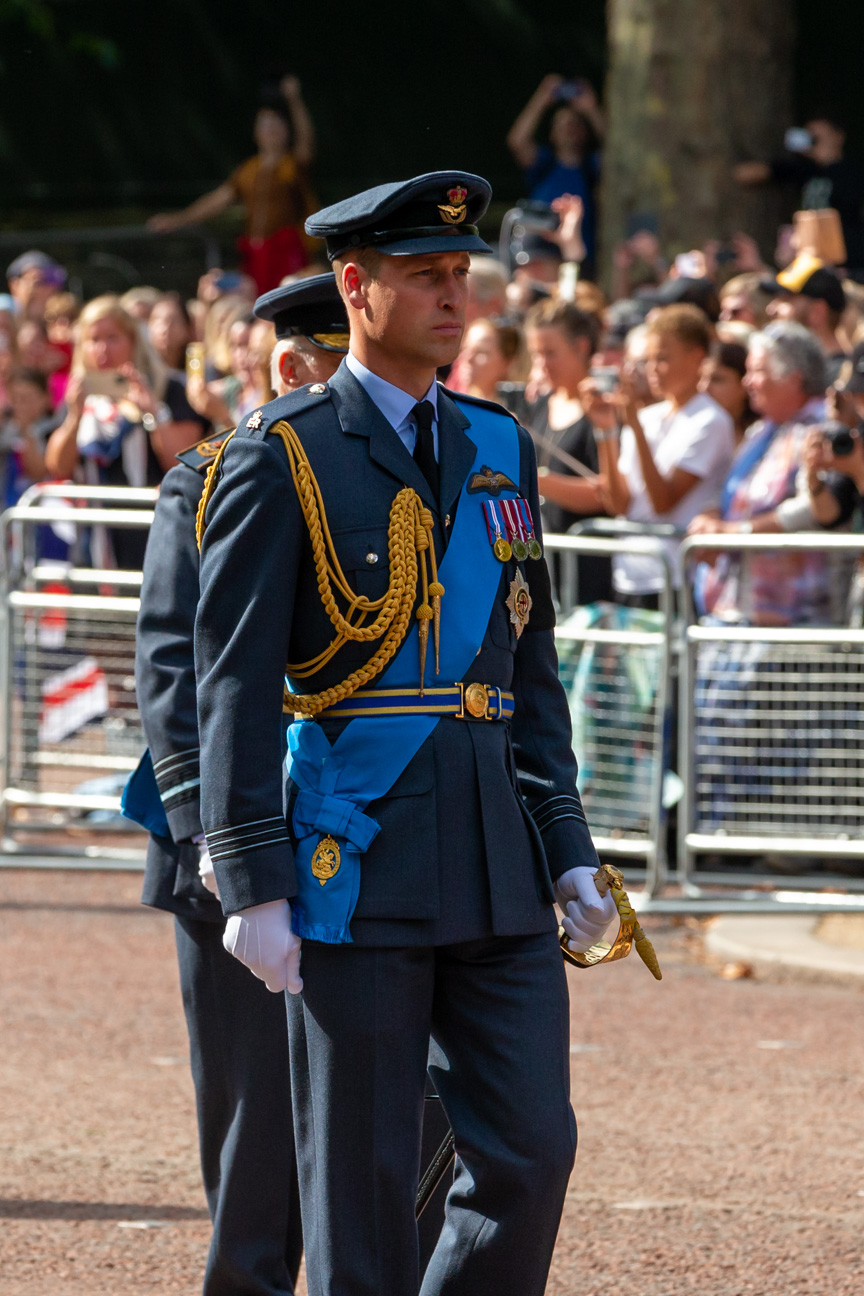
William in September 2022, during the procession for Queen Elizabeth II's funeral, wearing No. 1A Service Dress (Ceremonial Day Dress) uniform of the Royal Air Force with his rank of Squadron Leader at the time

United Kingdom

- British Army
  - 8 January 2006: Officer Cadet
  - 16 December 2006: Cornet (Second Lieutenant), The Blues and Royals (short service commission)
  - 16 December 2006: Lieutenant, The Blues and Royals
  - 1 January 2009: Captain, The Blues and Royals (and transferred to a full regular commission)
  - 1 January 2016: Major
  - 11 August 2023: Lieutenant Colonel
- Royal Navy
  - 1 January 2008: Sub-lieutenant
  - 1 January 2009: Lieutenant
  - 1 January 2016: Lieutenant Commander
  - 11 August 2023: Commander
- Royal Air Force
  - 1 January 2008: Flying Officer
  - 1 January 2009: Flight Lieutenant
  - 1 January 2016: Squadron Leader
  - 11 August 2023: Wing Commander

=== Honorary appointments ===
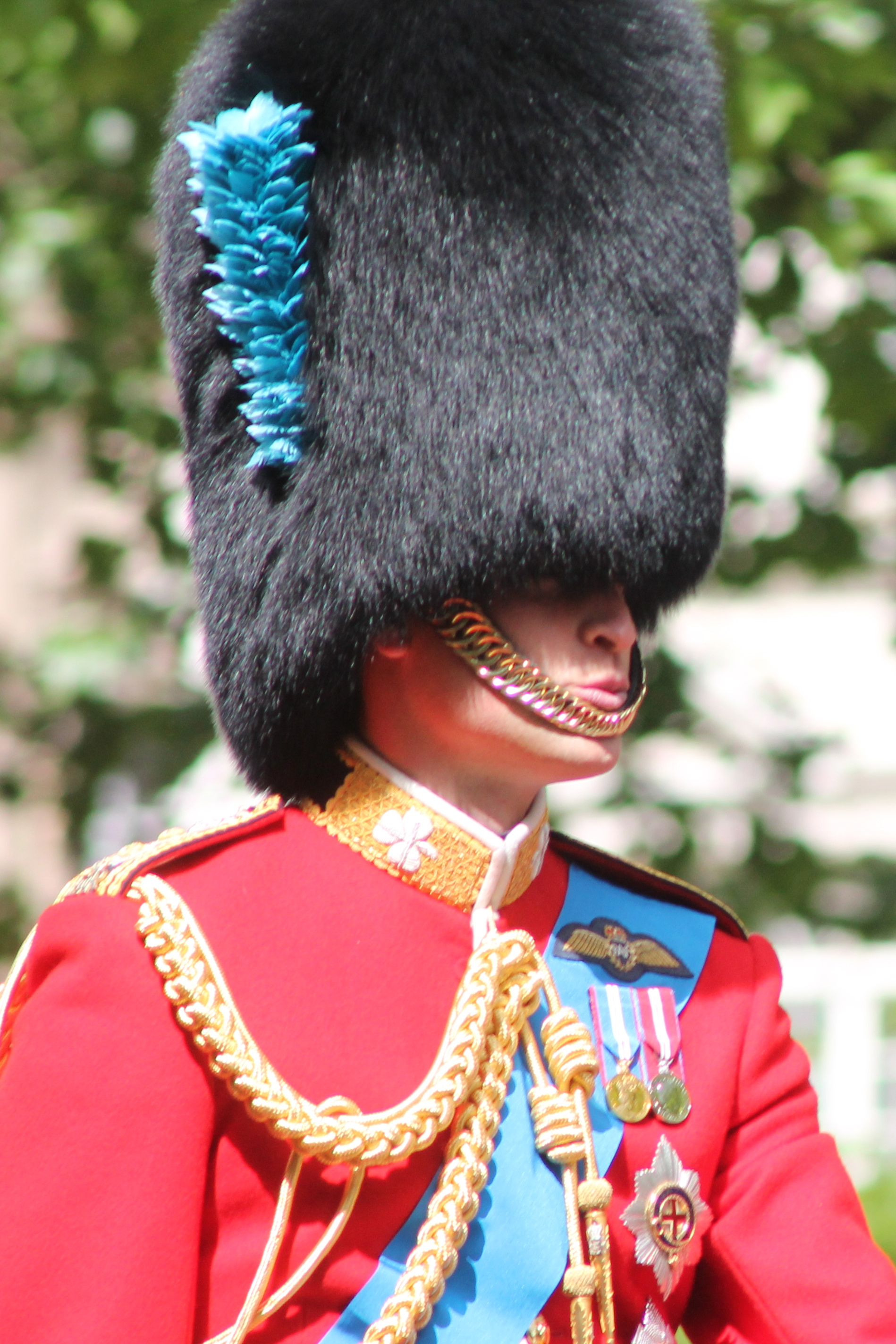
Prince William, then Duke of Cambridge, in uniform as Colonel of the Irish Guards in 2013

Canada

- (Canada) 10 November 2009: Honorary Canadian Ranger

United Kingdom

- (United Kingdom) 8 August 2006 – present: Commodore-in-Chief, Royal Navy Submarine Service
- (United Kingdom) 8 August 2006 – present: Commodore-in-Chief, Scotland
- (United Kingdom) 3 October 2008 – 11 August 2023: Honorary Air Commandant, RAF Coningsby
- (United Kingdom) 11 August 2023 – present: Royal Honorary Air Commodore, RAF Valley
- (United Kingdom) 10 February 2011 – 21 December 2022: Colonel, Irish Guards
- (United Kingdom) 21 December 2022 – present: Colonel, Welsh Guards
- (United Kingdom) 11 August 2023 – present: Colonel-in-Chief, Mercian Regiment
- (United Kingdom) 11 August 2023 – present: Colonel-in-Chief, Army Air Corps

== University degrees ==
- (Scotland) University of St Andrews, Master of Arts (Hons), 23 June 2005

== Honours and decorations ==
=== Commonwealth realms ===
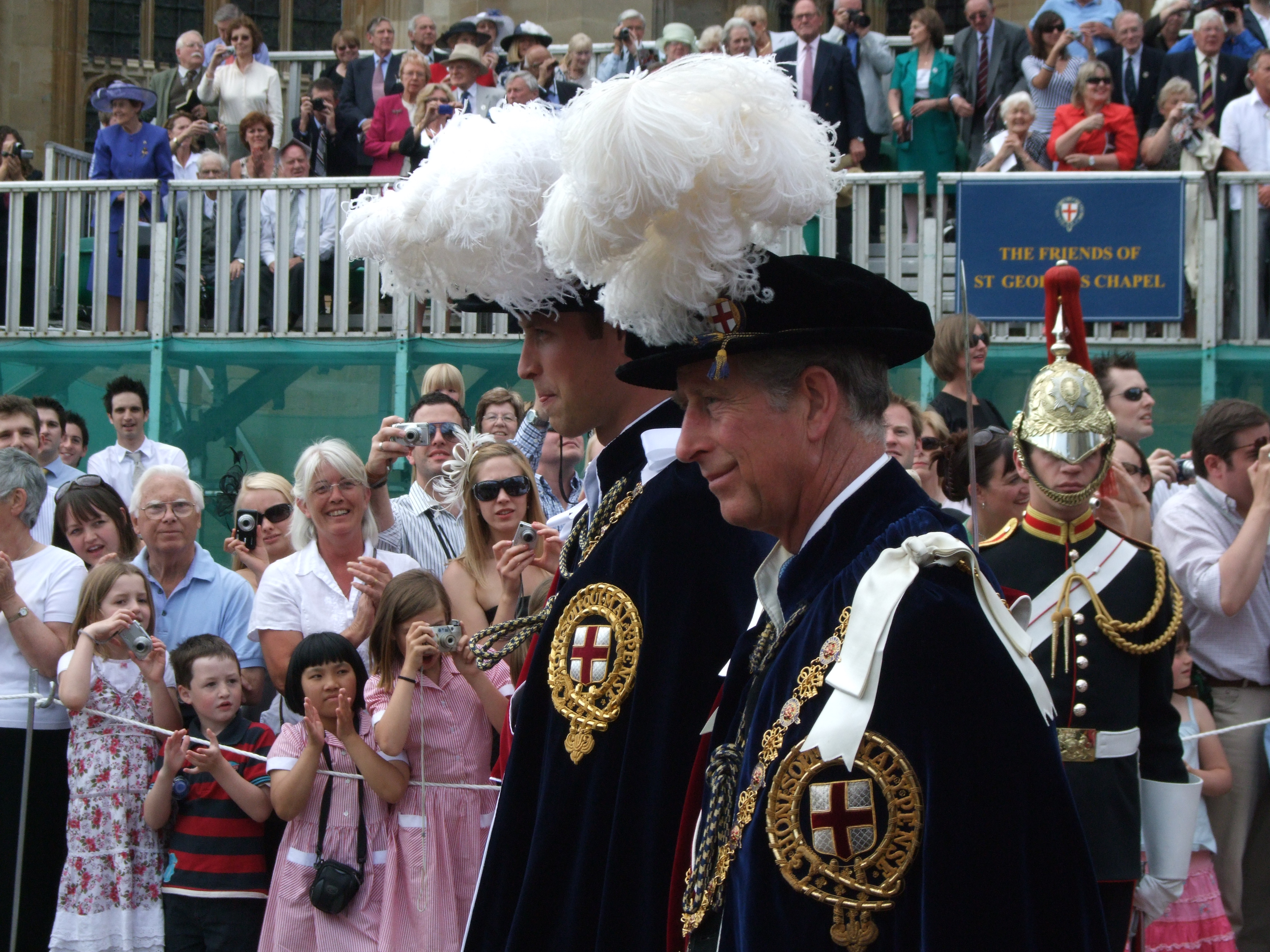
Accompanied by his father, Prince William proceeds to St George's Chapel, Windsor, to be installed as the 1000th Knight of the Garter in 2008

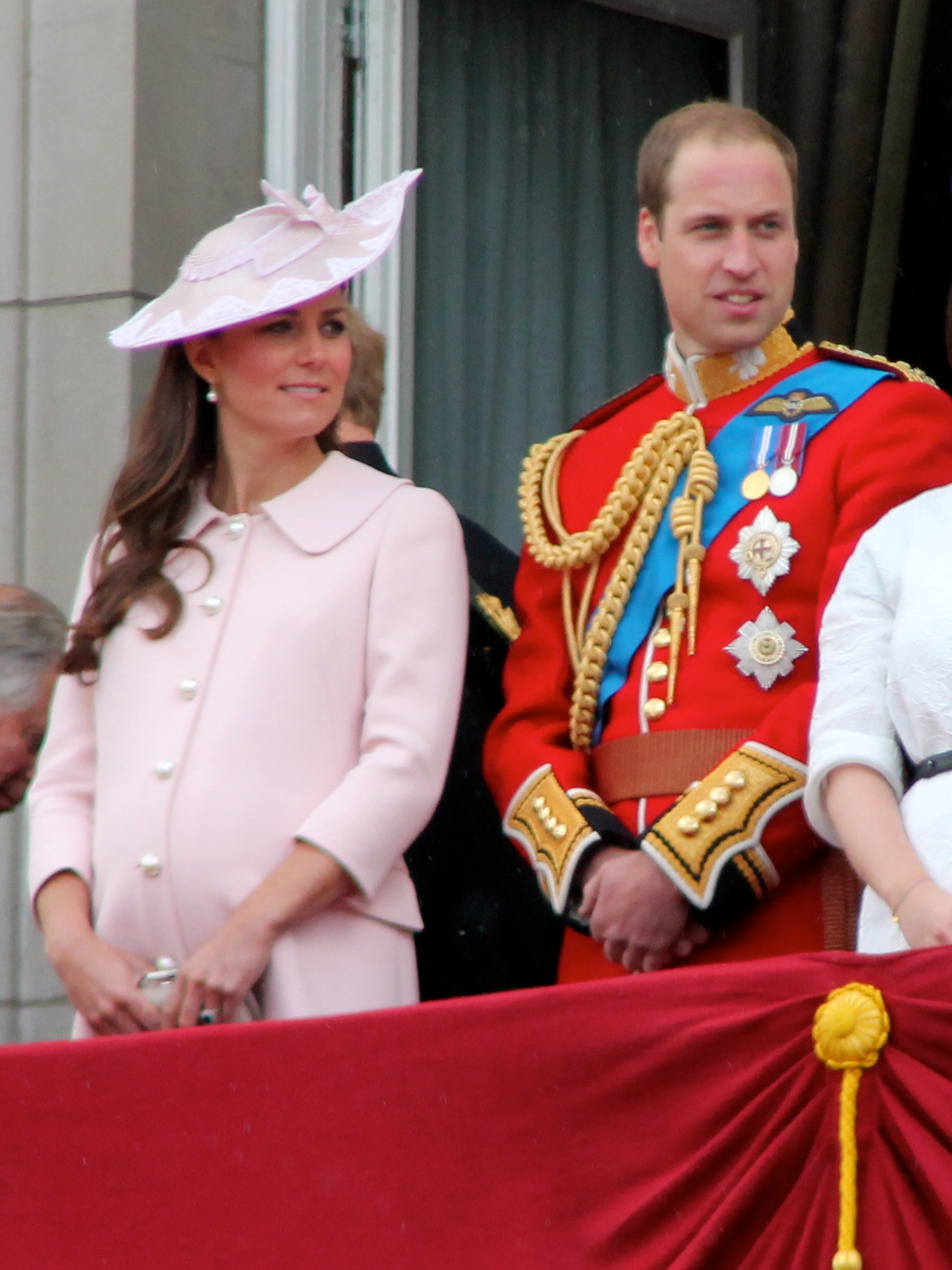
Prince William wearing the insignia (aiguillette over his right shoulder and chest) of a personal aide-de-camp to the sovereign in 2013

Appointments
Country	Date	Appointment	Ribbon	Post-nominal letters
United Kingdom	23 April 2008	Royal Knight Companion of the Most Noble Order of the Garter		KG
United Kingdom	25 May 2012	Extra Knight of the Most Ancient and Most Noble Order of the Thistle		KT
United Kingdom	17 March 2013	Personal Aide-de-Camp to the Queen		ADC(P)
United Kingdom	9 June 2016	Member of His Majesty's Most Honourable Privy Council		PC
Tuvalu	30 October 2017	Tuvalu Order of Merit		
United Kingdom	11 May 2023	Personal Aide-de-Camp to the King		ADC(P)
United Kingdom	23 April 2024	Great Master of the Most Honourable Order of the Bath		GCB

Decorations and medals
Country	Date	Appointment	Ribbon
United Kingdom	6 February 2002	Queen Elizabeth II Golden Jubilee Medal	
United Kingdom	6 February 2012	Queen Elizabeth II Diamond Jubilee Medal	
United Kingdom	6 February 2022	Queen Elizabeth II Platinum Jubilee Medal	
United Kingdom	6 May 2023	King Charles III Coronation Medal	

=== Foreign honours ===
Honours
Country	Date	Appointment	Ribbon
France	8 July 2025	Grand Officer of the National Order of the Legion of Honour	

Decorations
Country	Date	Appointment	Ribbon
United States	6 July 2008	Joint Service Achievement Medal	

== Wear of orders, decorations and medals ==
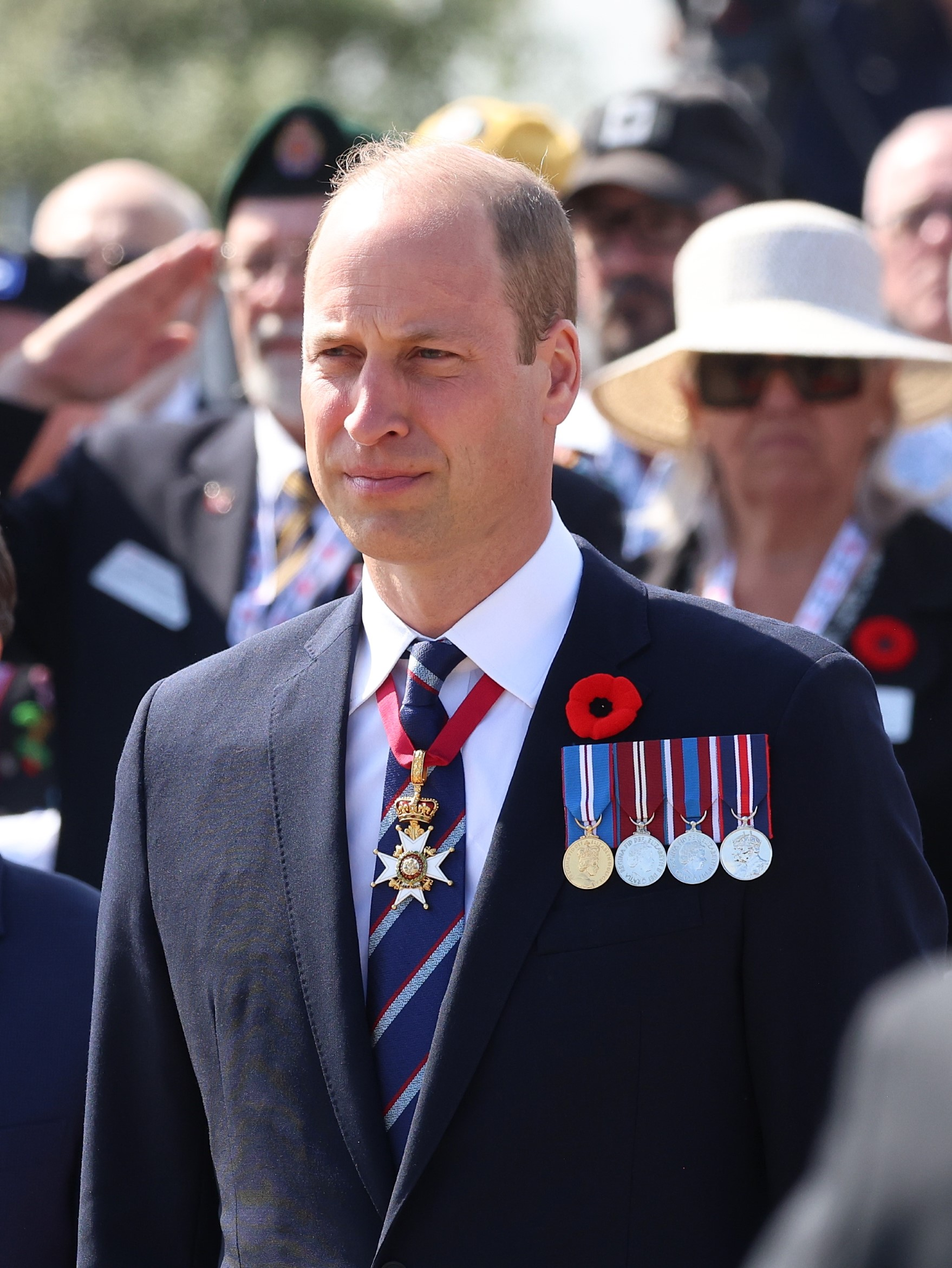
William at D-Day Commemorations in 2024

The ribbons worn regularly by William in undress uniform are as follows:

Ribbons of William, Prince of Wales

	Great Master of the Most Honourable Order of the Bath		
Queen Elizabeth II; Golden Jubilee Medal	Queen Elizabeth II; Diamond Jubilee Medal	Queen Elizabeth II; Platinum Jubilee Medal	King Charles III; Coronation Medal

With medals, William normally wears the breast stars of the Garter, Thistle and Bath. When only one should be worn, he wears the Garter star, except in Scotland where the Thistle star is worn.

== Non-national titles and honours ==
Country	Date	Organisation	Position
United Kingdom	6 July 2009 – present	Honourable Society of the Middle Temple	Royal Bencher
United Kingdom	23 June 2010 – present	Royal Society of London for Improving Natural Knowledge	Royal Fellow (FRS)
Scotland	1 March 2017 – present	Royal Society of Edinburgh	Royal Honorary Fellow (HonFRSE)
United Kingdom	17 January 2018 – present	Royal Society of Medicine	Honorary Fellow (FRSM)
United Kingdom	2018 – present	St John's College, Cambridge	Honorary Fellow
Scotland	25 January 2020 – 28 February 2022	General Assembly of the Church of Scotland	Lord High Commissioner
England		Honourable Company of Air Pilots	Liveryman

== Keys to the City ==
=== Foreign ===
- (Rio de Janeiro (state)) 3 November 2025: Rio de Janeiro

== Honorific eponyms ==
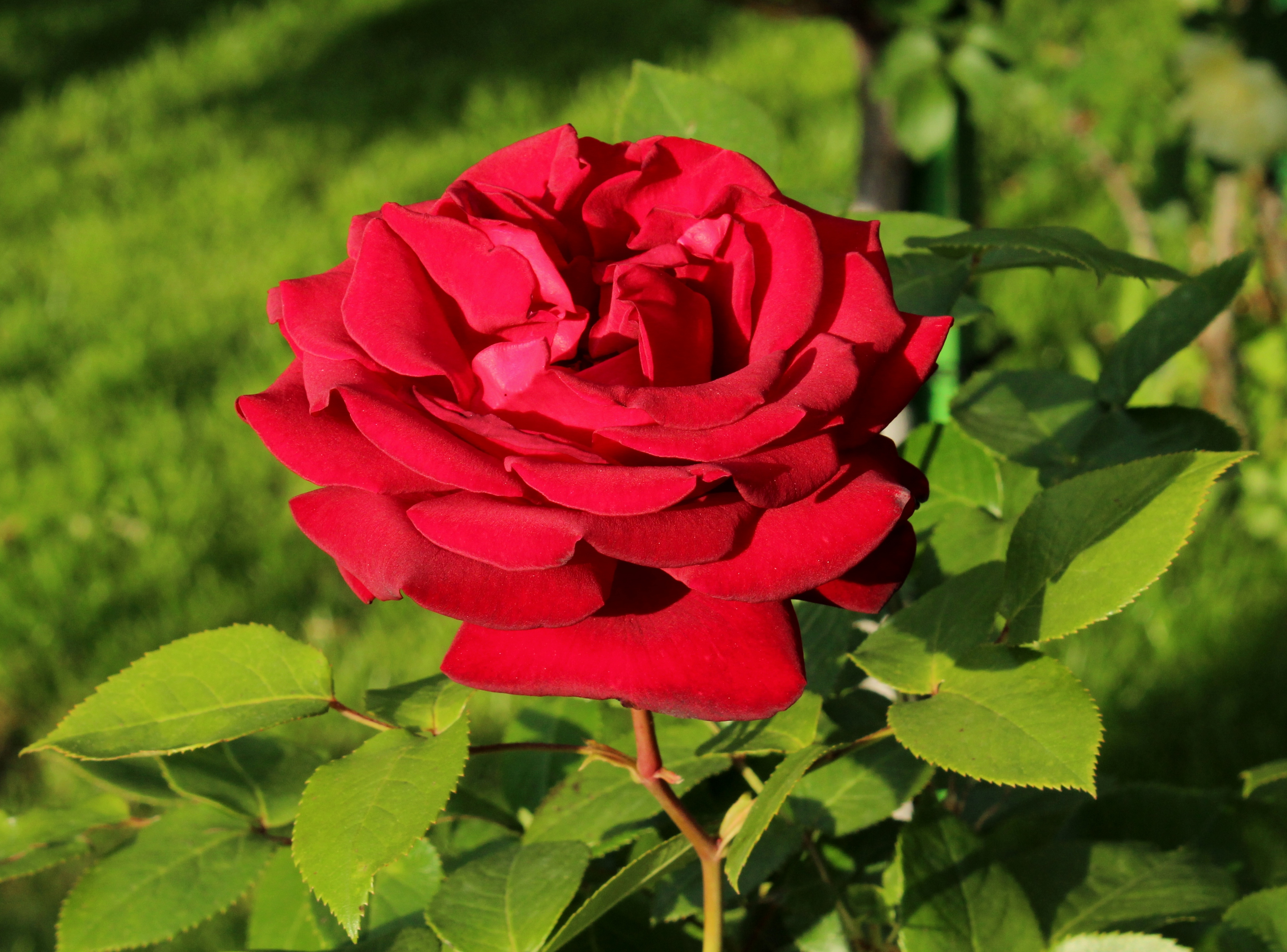
The Royal William rose

=== Awards ===
- Canada: Their Royal Highnesses The Duke and Duchess of Cambridge Award, University of Waterloo, Waterloo, Ontario
- Canada: Duke and Duchess of Cambridge's Parks Canada Youth Ambassadors Program
- United Kingdom: Duke of Cambridge Stakes, Ascot Racecourse

=== Buildings ===
- Canada: Duke of Cambridge Public School, Bowmanville, Ontario

=== Flowers ===
- Royal William rose
- Rosa 'William and Catherine'

=== Scholarships ===
- Canada: HRH Duke and Duchess of Cambridge Legacy Scholarship

== Arms ==
Coat of arms of William, Prince of Wales outside Scotland
Notes The coat of arms of the Prince of Wales, as used outside Scotland, is the royal coat of arms of the United Kingdom with the addition a three-pointed label and an inescutcheon bearing the arms of Wales. For the arms of the Duke of Rothesay in Scotland, see royal coat of arms of Scotland. Escutcheon Quarterly first and fourth Gules three lions passant guardant in pale Or armed and langed Azure second Or a lion rampant Gules armed and langued Azure within a double tressure flory counterflory third Azure a harp Or stringed Argent, with over all a label of three points Argent, and on an inescutcheon quarterly Or and Gules four lions passant guardant counterchanged, ensigned by the coronet of his degree. Symbolism As with the Royal Arms of the United Kingdom. The first and fourth quarters are the arms of England, the second of Scotland, the third of Ireland. The inescutcheon represents Wales. Previous versions Prince William was granted a personal coat of arms on his 18th birthday, differenced by a white (or silver) label with three points, the centre point bearing a red clam shell (an "escallop"), to distinguish it from the arms of other members of the Royal Family. The escallop (seashell) alludes to his late mother Diana, Princess of Wales, whose Spencer coat of arms includes three Escallops Argent. Other versions In February 2013, Queen Elizabeth II approved the conjugal arms of the Duke and Duchess of Cambridge, consisting of their individual arms displayed side by side, beneath a helm and coronet denoting the duke's status as grandson of the sovereign. These were released in September of the same year. In November 2025, a new conjugal arms of William and Catherine as the Prince and Princess of Wales was used officially for the first time.

Coat of arms of William, Duke of Rothesay in Scotland
Notes The coat of arms of the Duke of Rothesay are only used in Scotland. Outside of Scotland the coat of arms of the Prince of Wales is the royal coat of arms of the United Kingdom with the addition of a three-pointed label and an inescutcheon bearing the arms of Wales. Adopted 8 September 2022 Crest Upon the royal helm the coronet of the Prince of Wales, thereon a lion sejant affronté Gules armed and langued Azure, differenced with a label of three points azure, crowned with the coronet of the Prince of Wales holding in his dexter paw a sword and in his sinister a sceptre, both Proper Escutcheon Quarterly first and fourth Or fess chequy argent and azure second and third Argent a galley sable overall an inescutcheon Or a lion rampant gules armed and langued azure within a double tressure flory-counter-flory of the second a label of three points azure Supporters Unicorns Argent, armed, crined and unguled Or imperially crowned proper, gorged with a coronet Or composed of crosses patée and fleurs de lys a chain affixed thereto passing between the forelegs and reflexed over the back also Or, differenced with a label of three points azure. Sinister holding the standard of Saint Andrew, dexter holding the royal arms of Scotland differenced with a label of three points azure. Compartment A compartment underneath from which issue thistles one towards each side of the escutcheon Orders The Order of the Thistle collar Symbolism The first and fourth quarters represent the title of the Lord High Steward of Scotland with the arms of Clan Stewart, the second and third quarters represent the title of Lord of the Isles. The escutcheon honours Stewart of Appin; David Stewart being the first holder of the title. The inescutcheon shows the royal arms of Scotland differenced for the heir apparent with a label of three points azure. Previous versions Coat of arms of Prince William in Scotland prior to becoming Duke of Rothesay.

== Banners, flags, and standards ==
Feathers of the Prince of Wales

=== As heir apparent ===
The banners used by the Prince of Wales vary depending upon location. His personal standard is the Royal Standard of the United Kingdom differenced as in his arms with a label of three points Argent, and the escutcheon of the arms of the Principality of Wales in the centre. It is used outside Wales, Scotland, Cornwall, and Canada, and throughout the entire United Kingdom when the prince is acting in an official capacity associated with the United Kingdom Armed Forces.

The personal flag for use in Wales is based upon the Royal Badge of Wales (the historic arms of the Kingdom of Gwynedd), which consist of four quadrants, the first and fourth with a red lion on a gold field, and the second and third with a gold lion on a red field. Superimposed is an escutcheon Vert bearing the single-arched coronet of the Prince of Wales.

In Scotland, the personal banner used since 1974 is based upon three ancient Scottish titles: Duke of Rothesay (heir apparent to the King of Scots), High Steward of Scotland and Lord of the Isles. The flag is divided into four quadrants like the arms of the Chief of Clan Stewart of Appin; the first and fourth quadrants comprise a gold field with a blue and silver checkered band in the centre; the second and third quadrants display a black galley on a silver field. The arms are differenced from those of Appin by the addition of an inescutcheon bearing the tressured lion rampant of Scotland; defaced by a plain label of three points Azure to indicate the heir apparent.

In Cornwall, the banner is the arms of the Duke of Cornwall: "Sable 15 bezants Or", that is, a black field bearing 15 gold coins.

In Canada, a personal heraldic banner for the Prince of Wales was first issued in 2011, consisting of the shield of the Arms of Canada defaced with both a blue roundel of the Prince of Wales's feathers surrounded by a wreath of gold maple leaves, and a white label of three points.

Banners of arms

Royal standard of the Prince of Wales for the United Kingdom

Personal Banner for Wales

Royal Standard as Duke of Rothesay

Personal Banner for Scotland

Banner of arms for the Duke of Cornwall

Canadian standard for the Prince of Wales

=== Former standards ===
Prior to the accession of his father, William used a banner derived from his arms, for use outside of Scotland and Canada. There was a variation of this used when in Scotland. In 2011, the Canadian Heraldic Authority introduced a personal heraldic flag for the Duke of Cambridge's use in Canada. It is the Royal Arms of Canada in banner form defaced with a blue roundel surrounded with a wreath of gold maple leaves and shells within which is a depiction of a "W" surmounted by a coronet. Above the roundel is a white label of three points, charged with a red shell.

Standard for the Duke of Cambridge

Standard for the Earl of Strathearn

Former Canadian personal Standard for Prince William

== See also ==
- Cadency labels of the British royal family
- List of titles and honours of Catherine, Princess of Wales
- List of titles and honours of Charles III
- List of titles and honours of Queen Camilla
- List of titles and honours of Elizabeth II
- List of titles and honours of Prince Philip, Duke of Edinburgh
- List of titles and honours of Anne, Princess Royal
- List of titles and honours of Prince Edward, Duke of Edinburgh
- List of titles and honours of George VI
- List of titles and honours of Queen Elizabeth the Queen Mother
- List of titles and honours of George V
- List of titles and honours of Mary of Teck
- List of titles and honours of Edward VIII
- List of titles and honours of Prince Arthur, Duke of Connaught and Strathearn
