= List of titles and honours of Catherine, Princess of Wales =

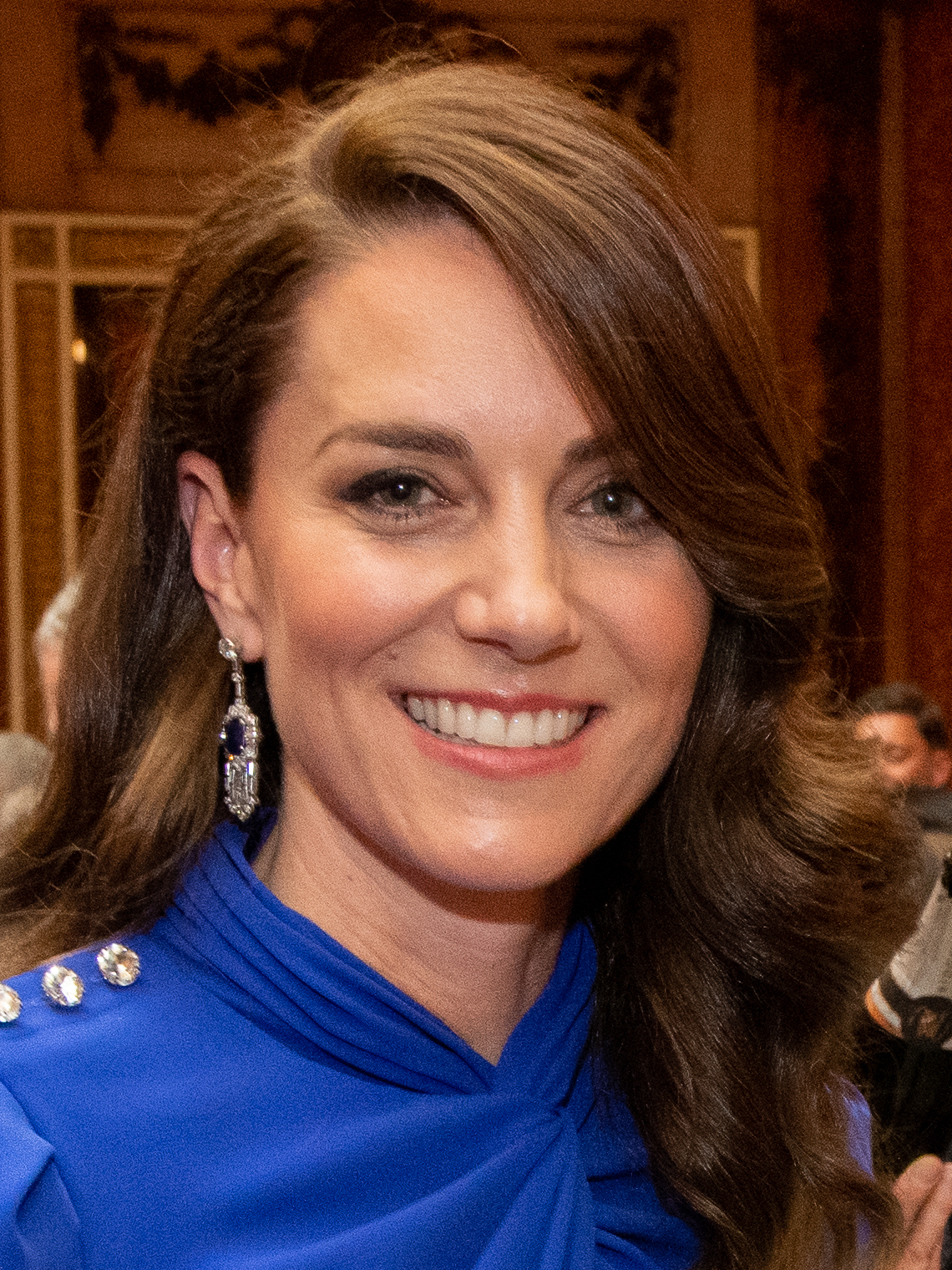
Catherine in 2023

Catherine, Princess of Wales has received several titles, decorations and honorary appointments both during her time as Duchess of Cambridge and Princess of Wales. Each is listed below.

== Royal and noble titles and styles ==
Upon her marriage in 2011, Catherine became a British princess by virtue of marriage and gained the style of Royal Highness. She also gained the titles of Duchess of Cambridge, Countess of Strathearn and Baroness Carrickfergus. She was normally styled as "Her Royal Highness The Duchess of Cambridge" except in Scotland, where she was instead styled "Her Royal Highness The Countess of Strathearn".

Upon her father-in-law's accession to the throne on 8 September 2022, Catherine also became Duchess of Cornwall as well as Duchess of Rothesay, Countess of Carrick, Baroness of Renfrew, and Lady of the Isles (all in Scotland). She was thus briefly called "Her Royal Highness The Duchess of Cornwall and Cambridge". On 9 September 2022, the King announced the appointment of William as Prince of Wales, with Catherine thus becoming Princess of Wales. As the wife of the Earl of Chester, she also bears the title Countess of Chester. Catherine is known as "Her Royal Highness The Princess of Wales", except in Scotland, where she is styled "Her Royal Highness The Duchess of Rothesay".

== Honours and decorations ==
=== Commonwealth realms ===
Orders (shown in order in which appointments were made, not order of precedence)

Country	Date	Appointment	Ribbon	Post-nominal letters
Tuvalu	30 October 2017	Recipient of the Tuvalu Order of Merit		
United Kingdom	5 December 2017	Recipient of the Royal Family Order of Elizabeth II		
United Kingdom	29 April 2019	Dame Grand Cross of the Royal Victorian Order		GCVO
United Kingdom	23 April 2024	Royal Companion of the Order of the Companions of Honour		CH
United Kingdom	8 July 2025	Recipient of the Royal Family Order of Charles III		

Decorations and medals (shown in order in which appointments were made, not order of precedence)

Country	Date	Decoration	Ribbon	Post-nominal letters
United Kingdom	6 February 2012	Recipient of the Queen Elizabeth II Diamond Jubilee Medal		
United Kingdom	6 February 2022	Recipient of the Queen Elizabeth II Platinum Jubilee Medal		
United Kingdom	6 May 2023	Recipient of the King Charles III Coronation Medal		

=== Foreign honours ===
Country	Date	Appointment	Ribbon	Post-nominal letters
France	8 July 2025	Grand Officer of the National Order of Merit		

== Honorary military appointments ==
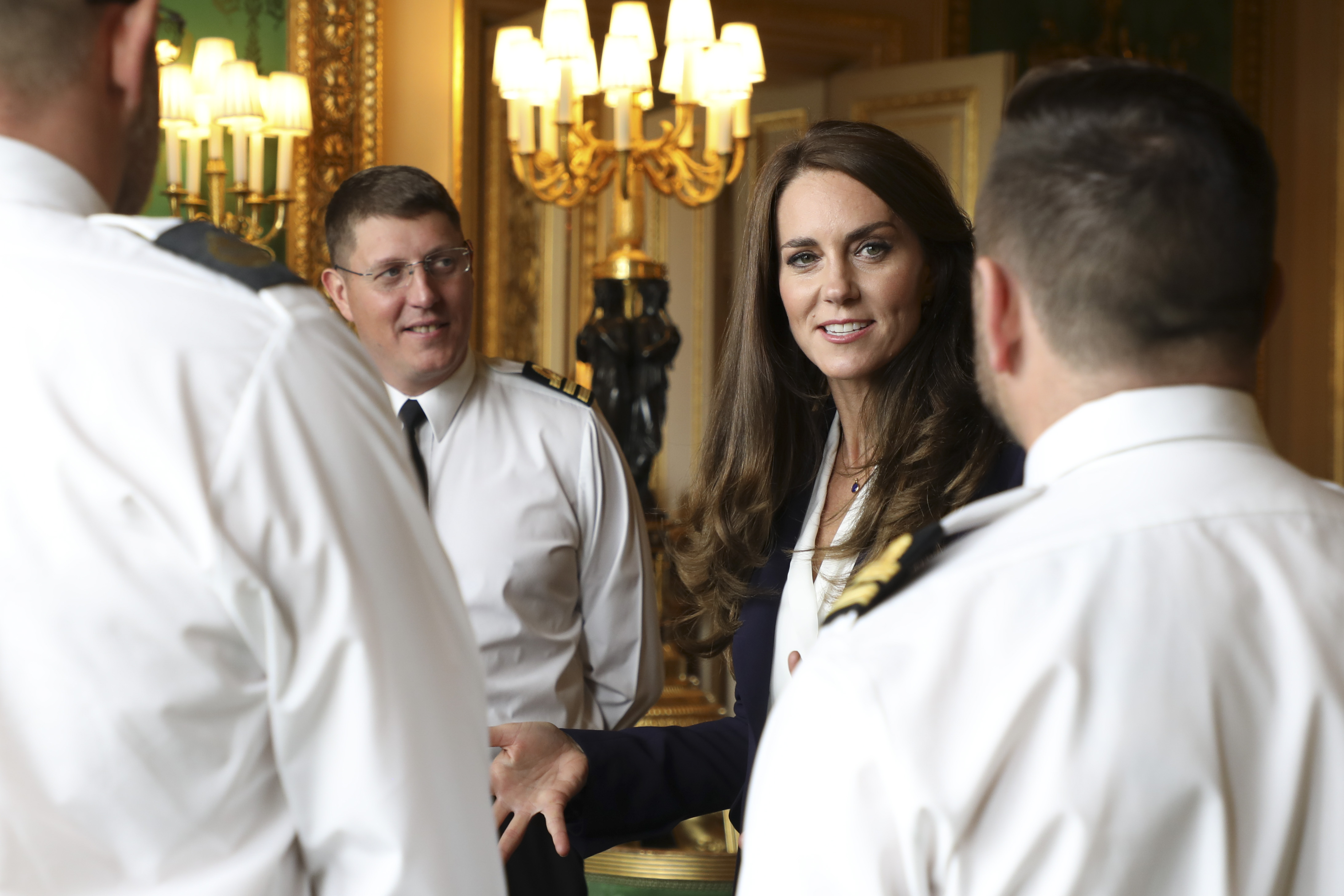
Catherine meeting the ship's company of HMS Glasgow at Windsor Castle, September 2022

Canada

- (Canada) 5 July 2011 – present: Honorary Canadian Ranger

United Kingdom

- (United Kingdom) 16 December 2015 – present: Honorary Air Commandant, Royal Air Force Air Cadets
- (United Kingdom) 11 August 2023 – present: Royal Honorary Air Commodore, RAF Coningsby
- (United Kingdom) 29 June 2021 – present: Lady Sponsor, HMS Glasgow
- (United Kingdom) 11 August 2023 – present: Commodore-in-Chief, Fleet Air Arm
- (United Kingdom) 21 December 2022 – present: Colonel, Irish Guards
- (United Kingdom) 11 August 2023 – present: Colonel-in-Chief, 1st The Queen's Dragoon Guards

== Other appointments ==
- 9 April 2013 – present: Lady Sponsor of Royal Princess
- 26 September 2019 – present: Lady Sponsor of RRS Sir David Attenborough

== University degrees ==
- 23 June 2005, University of St Andrews, Master of Arts (Hons)

== Awards ==
- 13 May 2026, Primo Tricolore award by the City of Reggio Emilia, Italy

== Honorific eponyms ==
- Their Royal Highnesses The Duke and Duchess of Cambridge Award, University of Waterloo in Waterloo, Ontario, Canada
- Duke and Duchess of Cambridge's Parks Canada Youth Ambassadors Program
- HRH Duke and Duchess of Cambridge Legacy Scholarship
- Rosa 'William and Catherine'
- Rosa 'Catherine's Rose'

== Arms ==
Coat of arms of Catherine, Princess of Wales
Notes Catherine bears the arms of her husband impaled with those of her father. The family arms were granted to her father by the College of Arms on 19 April 2011. Thomas Woodcock, then Garter King of Arms, the senior officer of the College of Arms, helped the family with the design. Meanwhile, the princess's entire heraldic achievement was approved by royal warrant by Queen Elizabeth II after the princess's marriage. The newly-approved arms included the addition of a new element specifically for the princess: a hind (female deer) supporter. Coronet Coronet of the heir apparent Escutcheon Quarterly first and fourth Gules three lions passant guardant in pale Or armed and langed Azure second Or a lion rampant Gules armed and langued Azure within a double tressure flory counterflory third Azure a harp Or stringed Argent, with over all a label of three points Argent, and on an inescutcheon ensigned by the coronet of the heir-apparent, quarterly, Or and Gules four lions passant guardant counterchanged, ensigned by the coronet of William's degree; Impaled with a shield per pale Azure and Gules, a chevron Or, cotised Argent, between three acorns slipped and leaved Or. Supporters To the dexter the Lion as borne and used as a Supporter by the Prince of Wales and to the sinister a Hind Argent unguled and gorged with the coronet of the heir apparent Or. The hind is white (argent) and is hooved, unguled and has about its neck (is gorged with) the Prince of Wales's coronet. Both the hooves and coronet are gold (Or). Orders The Royal Victorian Order circlet. VICTORIA Other elements Insignia of GCVO appended Symbolism The dividing line (between two colours) down the centre is a canting of the name 'Middle-ton'. The acorns (from the oak tree) are a traditional symbol of England and a feature of west Berkshire, where the family lived. The three acorns also denote the family's three children. The gold chevron in the centre of the arms is an allusion to Carole Middleton's maiden name of Goldsmith. The two white chevronels (narrow chevrons above and below the gold chevron) symbolise peaks and mountains, and the family's love of the Lake District and skiing. The white hind supporter echoes earlier royal heraldry, such as the white hind heraldic badge of Joan of Kent, Princess of Wales. Previous versions Catherine's coat of arms prior to her marriage depicted the shield from her father Michael Middleton's coat of arms shaped into a lozenge suspended from a ribbon symbolising her unmarried state. Her sister, Philippa, also used the same coat of arms prior to her 2017 marriage. Her brother, James, will in due course inherit his father's coat of arms. The arms granted to her following her marriage were depicted without the Royal Victorian Order circlet, to which she was appointed in 2019. Other versions In February 2013, Queen Elizabeth II approved the conjugal arms of the Duke and Duchess of Cambridge, consisting of their individual arms displayed side by side, beneath a helm and coronet denoting the duke's status as grandson of the sovereign. These were released in September of the same year. In November 2025, a new conjugal arms of William and Catherine as the Prince and Princess of Wales was used officially for the first time.

== See also ==
- Cadency labels of the British royal family
- List of titles and honours of William, Prince of Wales
- List of titles and honours of Charles III
- List of titles and honours of Queen Camilla
- List of titles and honours of Elizabeth II
- List of titles and honours of Prince Philip, Duke of Edinburgh
- List of titles and honours of Anne, Princess Royal
- List of titles and honours of Prince Edward, Duke of Edinburgh
- List of titles and honours of George VI
- List of titles and honours of Queen Elizabeth the Queen Mother
- List of titles and honours of George V
- List of titles and honours of Mary of Teck
- List of titles and honours of Edward VIII
- List of titles and honours of Prince Arthur, Duke of Connaught and Strathearn
