= List of titles and honours of Prince Arthur, Duke of Connaught and Strathearn =

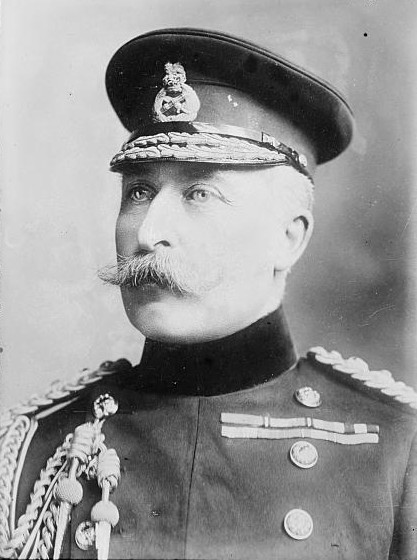
Prince Arthur, Duke of Connaught and Strathearn

This is a list of the titles and honours held by Prince Arthur, Duke of Connaught and Strathearn, a senior officer of the British Army, Governor General of Canada, and member of the British royal family as the seventh child and third son of Queen Victoria.

== Name ==
On 22 June 1850 Prince Arthur was baptised in the Chapel at Buckingham Palace with the Christian names Arthur William Patrick Albert. As a member of the Royal Family, he had no surname until 17 July 1917, when a Royal Proclamation of King George V declared that all British descendants in the male line of Queen Victoria would bear the name of Windsor.

== Titles, styles and honours ==
As a son of the sovereign, Arthur had the title of Prince and the style of Royal Highness from birth. The princely title had been used for sons of the sovereign since Tudor times and was formalised by letters patent of 30 November 1917, while the style of Royal Highness had been used since the Restoration and was confirmed by letters patent of 3 February 1864. Through his father, Prince Albert, he also bore the titles Prince of Saxe-Coburg and Gotha and Duke of Saxony until 17 July 1917, when King George V discontinued the use of German titles.

On 24 May 1874, Prince Arthur was created Duke of Connaught and Strathearn and Earl of Sussex, in the Peerage of the United Kingdom. As a duke of the Blood Royal, he had the formal style of Most High, Most Mighty, and Illustrious Prince Arthur William Patrick Albert, Duke of Connaught and Strathearn and Earl of Sussex.

=== British ===
Country	Date	Appointment	Ribbon	Post-nominal letters	Notes
(England)	31 May 1867	Royal Knight Companion of the Most Noble Order of the Garter		KG	
	30 March 1869	Knight of the Most Illustrious Order of Saint Patrick		KP	
(Scotland)	24 May 1869	Extra Knight of the Most Ancient and Most Noble Order of the Thistle		KT	
(United Kingdom)	16 April 1870	Knight Grand Cross of the Most Distinguished Order of Saint Michael and Saint George		GCMG	
	1870	Canadian General Service Medal			with clasp for Fenian Raid
(United Kingdom)	1882	Egypt Medal			with clasp for Battle of Tel el-Kebir
	1 January 1877	Extra Knight Grand Commander of the Most Exalted Order of the Star of India		GCSI	
(United Kingdom)	17 November 1882	Companion of the Most Honourable Order of the Bath		CB	Military Division
	21 June 1887	Extra Knight Grand Commander of the Most Eminent Order of the Indian Empire		GCIE	
	6 May 1896	Knight Grand Cross of the Royal Victorian Order		GCVO	
	1896	Knight of the Most Venerable Order of the Hospital of Saint John of Jerusalem		KStJ	
(United Kingdom)	8 July 1890	Knight Commander of the Most Honourable Order of the Bath		KCB	Military Division
(United Kingdom)	27 May 1892	Volunteer Officers' Decoration		VD	
(United Kingdom)	21 May 1898	Knight Grand Cross of the Most Honourable Order of the Bath		GCB	Military Division
(United Kingdom)	26 February 1901	Great Master of the Order of the Most Honourable Order of the Bath			
	11 August 1902	Recipient of the Royal Victorian Chain			
	23 June 1910	Grand Prior of the Order of the Most Venerable Order of the Hospital of Saint John of Jerusalem			
(United Kingdom)	4 June 1917	Knight Grand Cross of the Most Excellent Order of the British Empire		GBE	
(United Kingdom)	26 July 1919	British War Medal			
(United Kingdom)	1 September 1919	Victory Medal			
	12 June 1926	Bailiff Grand Cross of the Most Venerable Order of the Hospital of Saint John of Jerusalem		GCStJ	
(United Kingdom)	19 June 1934	Territorial Decoration		TD	

The Duke was Bailiff of Egle from 1894.

=== Foreign ===
Variant of the arms of Prince Arthur as knight of the Spanish branch of the Golden Fleece and the Order of Charles III

- (Duchy of Anhalt) Anhalt: Grand Cross of the Order of Albert the Bear, 1890
- (Austrian Empire) (Kingdom of Hungary) Austria-Hungary: Grand Cross of the Royal Hungarian Order of St. Stephen, 1873
- Baden: Knight of the House Order of Fidelity, 7 September 1906
- Bavaria: Knight of St. Hubert
- Belgium: Grand Cordon of the Order of Leopold (military), 1873
- Brunswick: Grand Cross of the Order of Henry the Lion, 1890
- Denmark: Knight of the Elephant, 2 August 1873
- (Saxe-Coburg and Gotha) (Duchy of Saxe-Altenburg) (Saxe-Meiningen) Ernestine duchies: Grand Cross of the Saxe-Ernestine House Order, May 1868
- Ethiopia: Grand Cross of the Star of Ethiopia, 20 August 1917
- France: Grand Cross of the Legion of Honour, 20 December 1898
- Greece: Grand Cross of the Redeemer, 5 May 1879
- Hesse and by Rhine:
  - Grand Cross of the Ludwig Order, 4 February 1872
  - Grand Cross of the Merit Order of Philip the Magnanimous, with Swords, 18 February 1878
- Italy:
  - Knight of the Annunziata, 18 November 1903
  - Grand Cross of Saints Maurice and Lazarus, 18 November 1903
  - Grand Cross of the Military Order of Savoy, 20 August 1917
- Japan: Grand Cordon of the Order of the Chrysanthemum, 8 May 1890
- Mecklenburg: Grand Cross of the Wendish Crown, with Crown in Ore, 27 July 1879
- Monaco: Grand Cross of St. Charles, 20 August 1917
- Montenegro: Grand Cross of the Order of Prince Danilo I, 26 March 1897
- Netherlands: Grand Cross of the Netherlands Lion, 23 August 1878
- Norway: Grand Cross of St. Olav, with Collar, 13 November 1906
- Ottoman Empire:
  - Order of Osmanieh, 1st Class in Diamonds, 17 July 1867
  - Order of the Medjidie, 2nd Class, November 1882
- Tunisia: Grand Cordon of the Order of Glory, 1 June 1865
- Portugal: Grand Cross of the Tower and Sword, 3 April 1879
- Prussia:
  - Knight of the Black Eagle, with Collar, 17 February 1872
  - Grand Commander's Cross of the Royal House Order of Hohenzollern, 11 March 1878
  - Pour le Mérite (military), 17 November 1882
- Romania: Grand Cross of the Crown of Romania, 20 August 1917
- Spain:
  - Grand Cross of the Order of Charles III, with Collar, 16 April 1876
  - Grand Cross of Military Merit, November 1882
  - Knight of the Golden Fleece, 15 May 1902 (during his attendance of the enthronement ceremonies for King Alfonso XIII)
- Sweden:
  - Knight of the Seraphim, 18 July 1873
  - Commander Grand Cross of the Sword, 15 December 1902
  - Knight of the Order of Charles XIII, 1905
- Württemberg: Grand Cross of the Württemberg Crown, 1904

== Military ==
=== Ranks ===
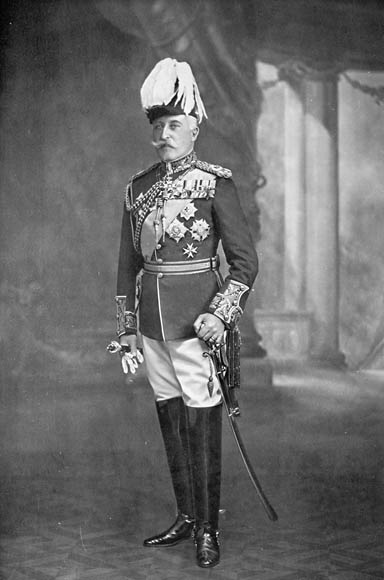
The Duke of Connaught in Field Marshal's uniform, 1915

- 1866: Cadet, RMA Woolwich
- 19 June 1868: Lieutenant, Royal Engineers
- 2 November 1868: Lieutenant, Royal Regiment of Artillery
- 3 August 1869: Lieutenant, Rifle Brigade
- 1 May 1871: Captain, Rifle Brigade
- 14 April 1874: Captain, 7th Hussars
- 7 August 1875: Major, 7th Hussars
- 27 September 1876: Lieutenant-Colonel, Rifle Brigade
- 29 May 1880: Brevet Colonel, British Army
- 29 May 1880: Major-General, British Army
- 14 December 1886: Lieutenant-General, British Army (local rank while commanding the troops in Bombay)
- 1 April 1889: Lieutenant-General, British Army (supernumerary)
- 1 April 1893: General, British Army (supernumerary)
- 26 June 1902: Field Marshal, British Army
- 18 October 1920: Honorary Captain, Royal Naval Reserve

=== Honorary appointments ===
==== Personal Aide-de-Camp ====
- 26 May 1876: to Queen Victoria
- 1901: to King Edward VII
- 3 June 1910: to King George V
- 1936: to King Edward VIII
- 1937: to King George VI

==== Colonel of the Regiment ====
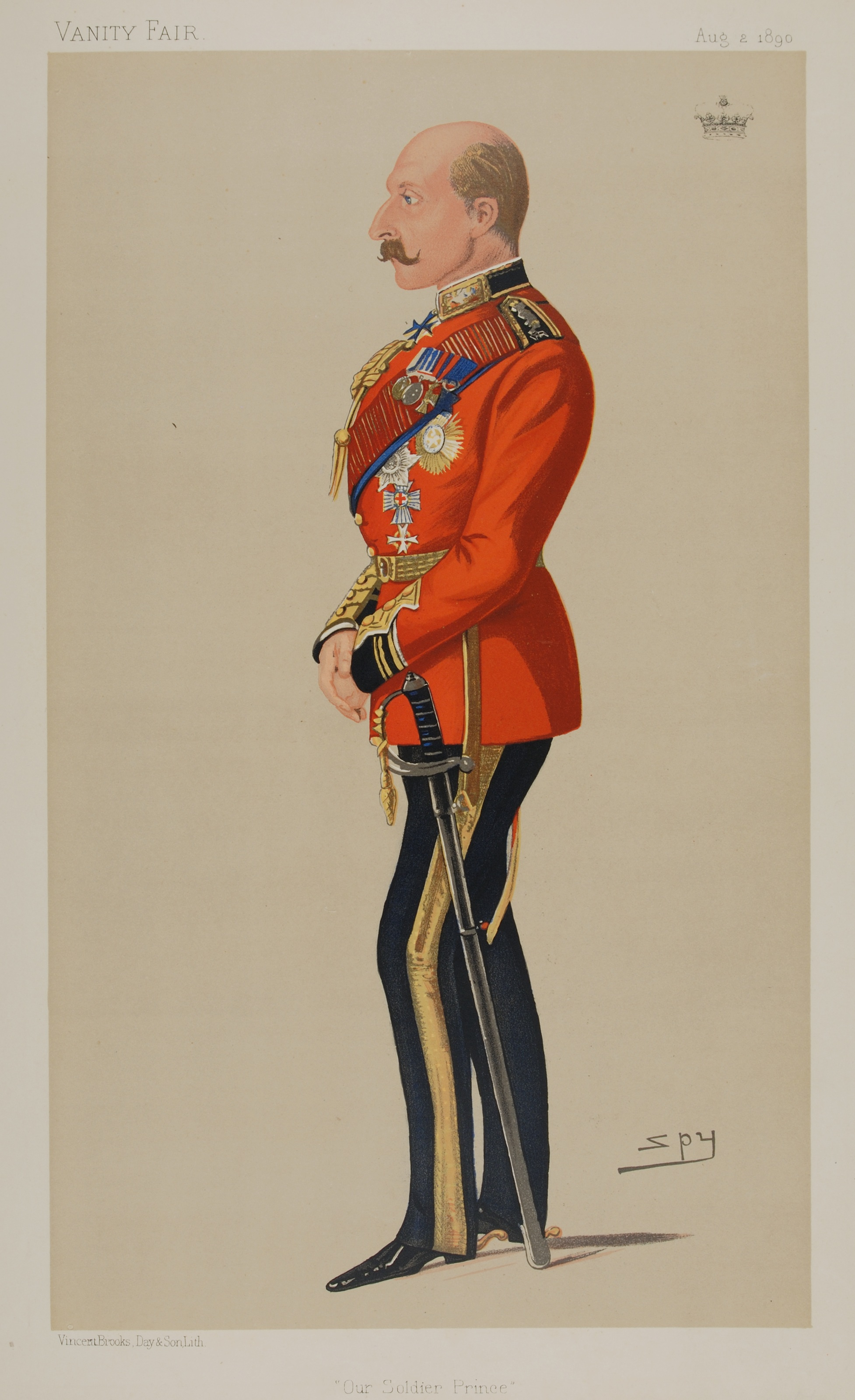
The Duke of Connaught as Colonel of the Scots Guards, 1890

- 24 June 1883: Scots Guards (until 1 May 1904)
- 2 September 1902: Army Service Corps
- 1 May 1904: Grenadier Guards
- 13 October 1911 – 11 November 1916: Colonel of the Governor General's Body Guard
- 13 October 1911 – 11 November 1916: Colonel of the Governor General's Foot Guards
- 13 October 1911 – 11 November 1916: Colonel of the 1st Regiment Canadian Grenadier Guards

==== Honorary Colonel ====
- 30 June 1871: 28th Middlesex Rifle Volunteer Corps
- 26 April 1873: Royal East Kent Yeomanry (until 16 January 1878)
- 24 July 1875: Hampshire and Isle of Wight Artillery
- 1 September 1883: 7th Bengal Native Infantry (until 13 May 1904)
- 1 September 1883: 29th Bombay Native Infantry (2nd Biluch Regiment) (until 13 May 1904)
- 27 February 1886: Royal East Kent Yeomanry
- 12 February 1896: 3rd and 4th Battalions, Highland Light Infantry
- 1 May 1900: 6th Regiment "The Duke of Connaught's Own Rifles"
- 19 March 1904: South of Ireland Imperial Yeomanry

==== Colonel-in-Chief ====
- 29 May 1880: Rifle Brigade
- 22 June 1897: 6th Dragoons
- 4 September 1901: Highland Light Infantry
- 13 May 1904: 13th Duke of Connaught's Lancers (Watson's Horse)
- 13 May 1904: 31st Duke of Connaught's Own Lancers
- 13 May 1904: 7th (Duke of Connaught's Own) Rajputs
- 13 May 1904: 129th Duke of Connaught's Own Baluchis
- 1929: The Royal Canadian Regiment

==== Foreign military appointments ====
- 1890s: Colonel à la suite 27th (Kiev) Regiment of Dragoons, Russian Army
- June 1905: Honorary General, Swedish Army
- 12 September 1906: Field Marshal, Prussian Army
- 21 May 1908: Honorary Lieutenant-Colonel, 9th (Arapiles) Battalion of Light Infantry, Spanish Army
- 24 May 1910: Honorary Admiral, Royal Danish Navy

== Civil ==
=== Privy Counsellor ===
- Member of the Privy Council of the United Kingdom, 16 May 1871
- Member of the Privy Council of Ireland, 10 January 1900

=== Others ===
- Ranger of Epping Forest, 1879
- Bencher of Gray's Inn, 4 July 1881
- Elder Brother of the Corporation of Trinity House, 1898; Master, 1910–1942
- High Steward of Wokingham

=== Freedom of the City ===
The Duke of Connaught and Strathearn received the Freedom of several locations during his life. These include

- (England) 1921: Portsmouth.

== See also ==
- List of titles and honours of George V
- List of titles and honours of Mary of Teck
- List of titles and honours of Edward VIII
- List of titles and honours of George VI
- List of titles and honours of Queen Elizabeth the Queen Mother
- List of titles and honours of Elizabeth II
- List of titles and honours of Prince Philip, Duke of Edinburgh
- List of titles and honours of Charles III
- List of titles and honours of Queen Camilla
- List of titles and honours of William, Prince of Wales
- List of titles and honours of Catherine, Princess of Wales
- List of titles and honours of Anne, Princess Royal
- List of titles and honours of Prince Edward, Duke of Edinburgh
