= List of titles and honours of Prince Edward, Duke of Edinburgh =

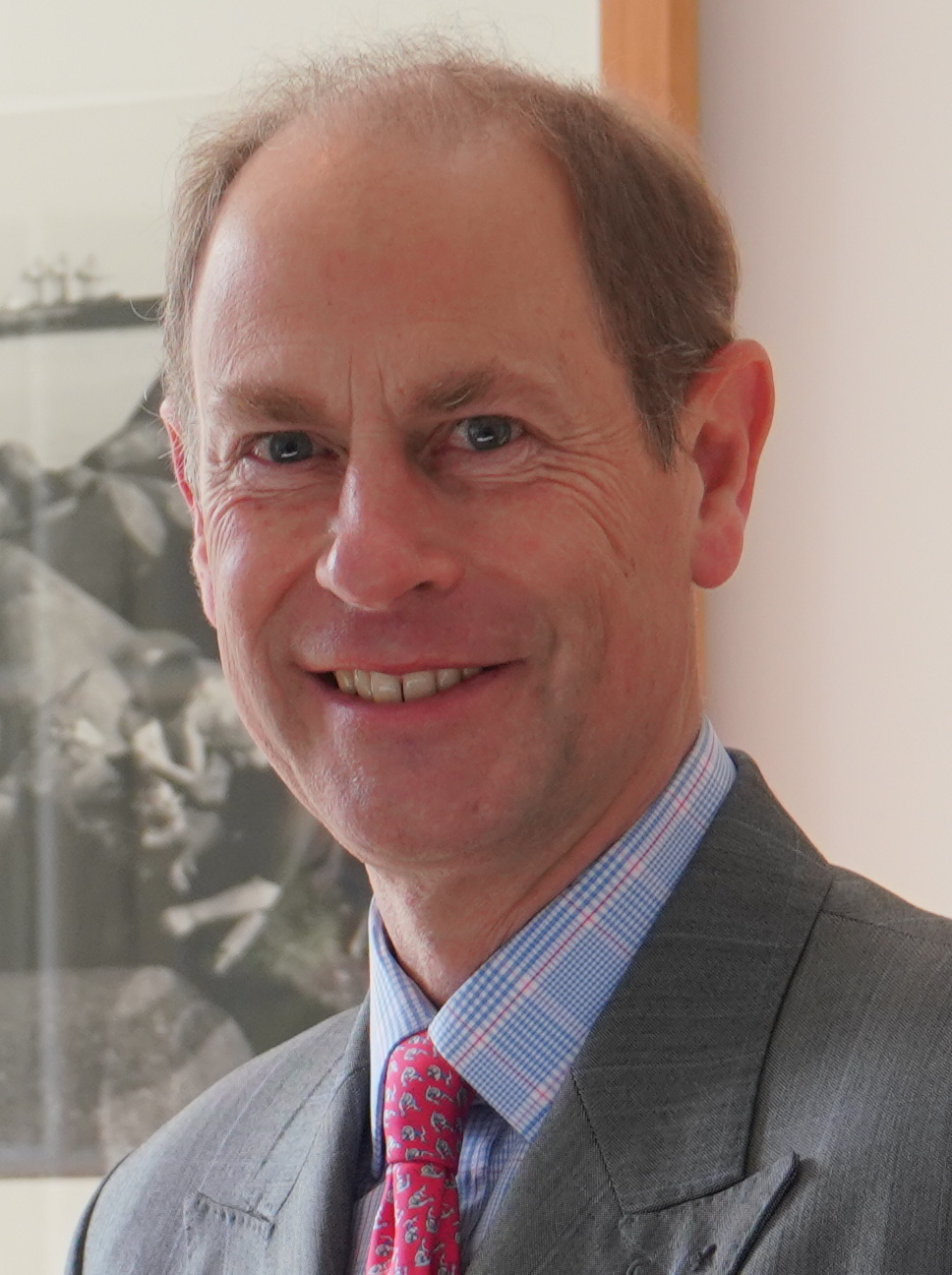
Edward in 2022

Prince Edward, Duke of Edinburgh has received numerous titles, decorations, and honorary appointments as a member of the British royal family and the brother of King Charles III of the United Kingdom and the other Commonwealth realms. Each is listed below; where two dates are shown, the first indicates the date of receiving the title or award (the title as Prince Edward being given as from his birth) and the second indicates the date of its loss or renunciation.

== Royal and noble titles and styles ==
Styles of Prince Edward, Duke of Edinburgh
- Reference style: His Royal Highness
- Spoken style: Your Royal Highness

- 10 March 1964 – 19 June 1999: His Royal Highness The Prince Edward
- 19 June 1999 – 10 March 2019: His Royal Highness The Earl of Wessex
- 10 March 2019 – 10 March 2023: His Royal Highness The Earl of Wessex and Forfar
- 10 March 2023 – present: His Royal Highness The Duke of Edinburgh

From birth until his marriage, Edward was known as "His Royal Highness The Prince Edward". Royal commentators conjectured that he – in line with standing tradition – might be granted a former royal dukedom upon marriage, e.g. that of Cambridge or Sussex. Instead, on 19 June 1999, he was created Earl of Wessex, and thus became "His Royal Highness Prince Edward, The Earl of Wessex". He was the first prince since the Tudors to be created an earl (thus reserving future advancement to a dukedom). The Sunday Telegraph reported that he was drawn to the earldom of Wessex after watching the 1998 film Shakespeare in Love, in which a minor character with that title was played by Colin Firth. Edward was also granted the subsidiary title of Viscount Severn. Buckingham Palace announced the intention that Edward would eventually be created Duke of Edinburgh, a title then held by his father, Prince Philip, once it had merged in the Crown upon the death of both his parents.

On 10 March 2019, his 55th birthday, Edward was granted the additional title of Earl of Forfar for use in Scotland. He was at times referred to as the "Earl of Wessex and Forfar", such as at the funeral of his father and the state funeral of his mother.

On his 59th birthday, 10 March 2023, Edward was created Duke of Edinburgh, thus becoming "His Royal Highness The Duke of Edinburgh". All his peerage titles contain the standard remainder to 'heirs male of his body', except for his ducal title, which is not hereditary and will revert to the crown upon his death.

== Military ranks ==
United Kingdom

- (United Kingdom) Royal Marines
  - October 1986 – January 1987: Second Lieutenant

== Commonwealth honours ==
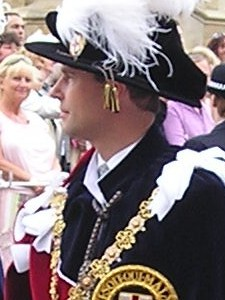
Edward in the robes of the Most Noble Order of the Garter

=== Commonwealth realms ===
Appointments (Shown in order in which appointments were made, not order of precedence)

Appointments from Commonwealth realms
Country	Date	Appointment	Ribbon	Post-nominal letters
United Kingdom	10 March 1989	Commander of the Royal Victorian Order		CVO
United Kingdom	2 June 2003	Knight Commander of the Royal Victorian Order		KCVO
United Kingdom	10 March 2011	Knight Grand Cross of the Royal Victorian Order		GCVO
Canada	11 May 2005	Member of the Saskatchewan Order of Merit		SOM
United Kingdom	1 August 2004	Personal Aide-de-Camp to the Sovereign		ADC
England and Wales	23 April 2006	Royal Knight Companion of the Most Noble Order of the Garter		KG
Scotland	10 March 2024	Extra Knight of the Most Ancient and Most Noble Order of the Thistle		KT

Decorations and medals (Shown in order in which appointments were made, not order of precedence)

Country	Date	Appointment	Ribbon	Post-nominal letters
United Kingdom	6 February 1977	Queen Elizabeth II Silver Jubilee Medal		
New Zealand	9 February 1990	New Zealand 1990 Commemoration Medal		
United Kingdom	6 February 2002	Queen Elizabeth II Golden Jubilee Medal		
Canada	27 May 2005	Commemorative Medal for the Centennial of Saskatchewan		
United Kingdom	6 February 2012	Queen Elizabeth II Diamond Jubilee Medal		
Canada	29 October 2015	Canadian Forces' Decoration		CD
United Kingdom	6 February 2022	Queen Elizabeth II Platinum Jubilee Medal		
United Kingdom	6 May 2023	King Charles III Coronation Medal		
Canada	13 June 2026	Royal Canadian Mounted Police Long Service Medal		

=== Other Commonwealth countries ===
Decorations and medals (Shown in order in which appointments were made, not order of precedence)

Country	Date	Appointment	Ribbon
Brunei	5 October 1992	Sultan of Brunei Silver Jubilee Medal	
Brunei	5 October 2017	Sultan of Brunei Golden Jubilee Medal	

== Foreign honours ==
Appointments (Shown in order in which appointments were made, not order of precedence)

Appointments from non-Commonwealth countries
Country	Date	Appointment	Ribbon	Post-nominal letters
Bahrain	16 December 2024	Member First Class of the King Hamad Order of the Renaissance		

Decorations and medals (Shown in order in which appointments were made, not order of precedence)

Country	Date	Appointment	Ribbon
Netherlands	2 February 2002	Prince Willem-Alexander and Máxima Zorreguieta Wedding Medal	
Monaco	12 July 2005	Prince Albert II Investiture Medal	
Sweden	19 June 2010	Crown Princess Victoria and Prince Daniel Wedding Medal	

== Wear of orders, decorations and medals ==
The ribbons worn regularly by Edward in undress uniform are as follows:

Ribbons of Prince Edward, Duke of Edinburgh

	Knight Grand Cross of the Royal Victorian Order		
Queen Elizabeth II; Silver Jubilee Medal	Queen Elizabeth II; Golden Jubilee Medal	Queen Elizabeth II; Diamond Jubilee Medal	Queen Elizabeth II; Platinum Jubilee Medal
King Charles III; Coronation Medal	Canadian Forces' Decoration with one clasp	New Zealand 1990; Commemoration Medal	Royal Canadian Mounted Police; Long Service Medal

With medals, Edward normally wears the breast stars of the Garter, Thistle, and Royal Victorian Order. When only one should be worn, he wears the Order of the Garter star, except in Scotland where the Order of the Thistle star is worn.

== Honorary military and police appointments ==
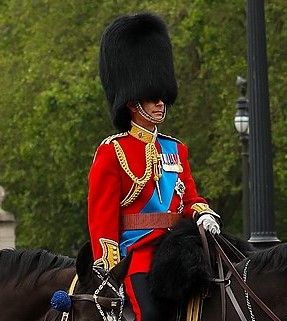
Edward, as colonel of the London Guards, riding in the 2023 Trooping the Colour

Canada

- (Canada) 2002–: Colonel-in-Chief of the Hastings and Prince Edward Regiment
- (Canada) 2003–: Colonel-in-Chief of the Saskatchewan Dragoons
- (Canada) 2005–: Colonel-in-Chief of the Prince Edward Island Regiment
- 2007–: Honorary Deputy Commissioner of the Royal Canadian Mounted Police

United Kingdom

- (United Kingdom) 19 August 2003–: Royal Honorary Colonel of the Royal Wessex Yeomanry
- (United Kingdom) 2006–: Commodore-in-Chief of the Royal Fleet Auxiliary
- (United Kingdom) 2007–: Royal Colonel of the 2nd Battalion, The Rifles
- (United Kingdom) 2008–: Honorary Air Commodore of Royal Air Force Waddington
- (United Kingdom) 1 May 2011 – 1 May 2022: Colonel of the London Regiment
- (United Kingdom) 1 May 2022–: Colonel of the London Guards
- (United Kingdom) 11 August 2023–: Colonel-in-Chief of the Queen's Royal Hussars
- (United Kingdom) 11 August 2023–: Colonel-in-Chief of the Royal Dragoon Guards
- (United Kingdom) 14 April 2024–: Colonel of the Scots Guards

== Non-national titles and honours ==
=== Civic ===
Country	Date	Organisation	Position
England	2008	Worshipful Company of Haberdashers	Honorary Liveryman
England	2008	Worshipful Company of Gardeners	Honorary Liveryman
England	2011	City of London	Freeman
England	2011	Worshipful Company of Haberdashers	Member, Court of Assistants
England	2011	Worshipful Company of Gardeners	Member, Court of Assistants
England	2011	Worshipful Company of Fuellers	Honorary Liveryman
England	2013–2014	Worshipful Company of Gardeners	Master
England	2017	Worshipful Company of Fuellers	Member, Court of Assistants
England	2017–2021	Worshipful Company of Fuellers	Master
Scotland	2025	Royal Society of Edinburgh	Honorary Fellow
England	2025	Honourable Company of Master Mariners	Master
England		Worshipful Company of Coopers	Honorary Liveryman
England		Company of Cutlers in Hallamshire	Honorary Member
Portugal	2026	Key to the City of Porto	

=== Religious ===
Country	Date	Organisation	Position
Scotland	2014	General Assembly of the Church of Scotland	Lord High Commissioner
Scotland	2024	General Assembly of the Church of Scotland	Lord High Commissioner

=== Academic ===
Country	Date	Institution	Position
England	2013	University of Bath	Chancellor

=== Honorary academic degrees ===
Country	Date	Institution	Degree
Canada	August 1994	University of Victoria	Doctor of Laws (LLD)
Canada	2007	University of Prince Edward Island	Doctor of Laws (LLD)
England	2013	University of Bath	Doctor of Laws (LLD)

== Honorific eponyms ==
=== Buildings ===
- Canada: Prince Edward Building, Regina, Saskatchewan

=== Geographical locations ===
- Canada: Prince Edward Park, Melfort, Saskatchewan

== See also ==
- List of titles and honours of Charles III
- List of titles and honours of Queen Camilla
- List of titles and honours of William, Prince of Wales
- List of titles and honours of Catherine, Princess of Wales
- List of titles and honours of Anne, Princess Royal
- List of titles and honours of Elizabeth II
- List of titles and honours of Prince Philip, Duke of Edinburgh
- List of titles and honours of George VI
- List of titles and honours of Queen Elizabeth the Queen Mother
- List of titles and honours of George V
- List of titles and honours of Mary of Teck
- List of titles and honours of Edward VIII
- List of titles and honours of Prince Arthur, Duke of Connaught and Strathearn
