= List of titles and honours of George V =

Titles of British monarch

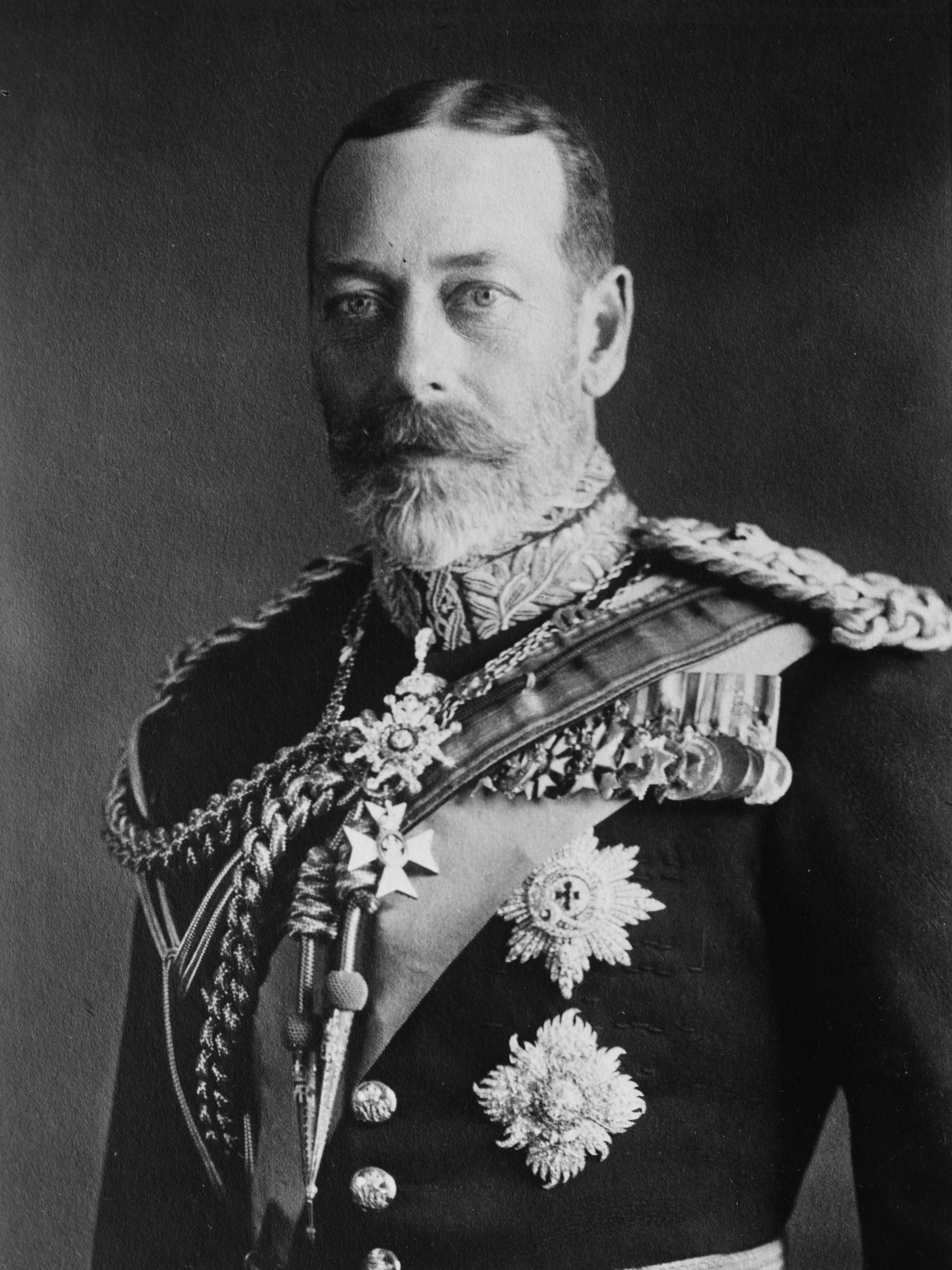
George in 1923

George V received numerous decorations and honorary appointments, both during and before his time as monarch of the United Kingdom and the dominions.

== Titles and styles ==
Styles of King George V
- Reference style: His Majesty
- Spoken style: Your Majesty

- 3 June 1865 – 24 May 1892: His Royal Highness Prince George of Wales
- 24 May 1892 – 22 January 1901: His Royal Highness The Duke of York
- 22 January – 9 November 1901: His Royal Highness The Duke of Cornwall and York
- 9 November 1901 – 6 May 1910: His Royal Highness The Prince of Wales
- 6 May 1910 – 20 January 1936: His Majesty The King

His full style as king was "George the Fifth, by the Grace of God, of the United Kingdom of Great Britain and Ireland and of the British Dominions beyond the Seas, King, Defender of the Faith, Emperor of India" until the Royal and Parliamentary Titles Act 1927, when it changed to "George V, by the Grace of God, of Great Britain, Ireland and the British Dominions beyond the Seas, King, Defender of the Faith, Emperor of India".

== British honours ==
- KG: Royal Knight Companion of the Most Noble Order of the Garter, 4 August 1884
- ADC: Personal aide-de-camp, 21 June 1887
- KT: Extra Knight of the Most Ancient and Most Noble Order of the Thistle, 5 July 1893
- Sub-Prior of the Venerable Order of Saint John of Jerusalem, 1893
- PC: Privy Counsellor, 18 July 1894
  - Privy Counsellor (Ireland), 20 August 1897
- GCVO: Knight Grand Cross of the Royal Victorian Order, 30 June 1897
- KP: Extra Knight of the Most Illustrious Order of St Patrick, 20 August 1897
- GCMG: Extra Knight Grand Cross of the Most Distinguished Order of St Michael and St George, 9 March 1901
- Recipient of the Royal Victorian Chain, 9 August 1902
- ISO: Companion of the Imperial Service Order, 31 March 1903
- GCSI: Extra Knight Grand Commander of the Most Exalted Order of the Star of India, 28 September 1905
- GCIE: Extra Knight Grand Commander of the Most Eminent Order of the Indian Empire, 28 September 1905
- Queen Victoria Golden Jubilee Medal, with 1897 bar
- King Edward VII Coronation Medal, 9 August 1902
- Lord Warden of the Cinque Ports, 1905–1907

On 4 June 1917, he founded the Most Excellent Order of the British Empire.

== Military appointments ==
=== Military ranks and naval appointments ===
- September 1877: Cadet, HMS Britannia
- 8 January 1880: Midshipman, HMS Bacchante and the corvette HMS Canada
- 3 June 1884: Sub-Lieutenant, Royal Navy
- 8 October 1885: Lieutenant, HMS Thunderer; HMS Dreadnought; HMS Alexandra; HMS Northumberland
- July 1889 I/C HMS Torpedo Boat 79
- By May 1890 I/C the gunboat HMS Thrush
- 24 August 1891: Commander, I/C HMS Melampus
- 2 January 1893: Captain, Royal Navy
- 1 January 1901: Rear-Admiral, Royal Navy
- 26 June 1903: Vice-Admiral, Royal Navy
- 1 March 1907: Admiral, Royal Navy
- 1910: Admiral of the Fleet, Royal Navy
- 1910: Field Marshal, British Army
- 1919: Chief of the Royal Air Force (title not rank, thus he did have the right to wear the uniform of MRAF in this capacity but never held the rank of MRAF)

=== Honorary military appointments ===
- 18 July 1900: Colonel-in-Chief of the Royal Fusiliers (City of London Regiment)
- 1 January 1901: Colonel-in-Chief of the Royal Marine Forces
- 25 February 1901: Personal Naval Aide-de-Camp to the King
- 29 November 1901: Honorary Colonel of the 4th County of London Yeomanry Regiment (King's Colonials)
- 21 December 1901: Colonel-in-Chief of the Royal Welch Fusiliers
- 12 November 1902: Colonel-in-Chief of the Queen's Own Cameron Highlanders
- 8 March 1912: Colonel-in-Chief of the 3rd (Auckland) Mounted Rifles
- 8 March 1912: Colonel-in-Chief of the 1st (Canterbury) Regiment
- April 1917: Colonel-in-Chief of the Royal Flying Corps (Naval and Military Wings)

== Foreign honours ==
- (Grand Duchy of Hesse) Grand Cross of the Ludwig Order, 22 July 1885
- (Denmark) Knight of the Order of the Elephant, 11 October 1885
- (Saxe-Coburg and Gotha) (Saxe-Meiningen) (Duchy of Saxe-Altenburg) Grand Cross of the Saxe-Ernestine House Order (Ernestine duchies), 1885
- (Kingdom of Portugal) Grand Cross of the Sash of the Two Orders, 20 May 1886
- Grand Cross of the Order of Charles III, 20 May 1888
  - Grand Cross with Collar, 30 May 1906
- (Kingdom of Prussia) Knight with Collar of the Order of the Black Eagle, 8 August 1889
- (Kingdom of Prussia) Grand Cross of the Order of the Red Eagle, 8 August 1889
- (Kingdom of Württemberg) Grand Cross of the Order of the Württemberg Crown, 1890
- (Denmark) Cross of Honour of the Order of the Dannebrog, 9 September 1891
- (Kingdom of Italy) Knight of the Supreme Order of the Most Holy Annunciation, 28 April 1892
- (Saxe-Weimar-Eisenach) Grand Cross of the Order of the White Falcon, 1892
- (Mecklenburg) Grand Cross with Crown in Ore of the House Order of the Wendish Crown, 22 June 1893
- Knight of the Order of the Golden Fleece, 17 July 1893
- (Russian Empire) Knight of the Order of St. Andrew, 1893
- (Russian Empire) Knight of the Order of St. Alexander Nevsky, 1893
- (Russian Empire) Knight of the Order of the White Eagle, 1893
- (Russian Empire) Knight 1st Class of the Order of St. Anna, 1893
- (Russian Empire) Knight 1st Class of the Order of St. Stanislaus, 1893
- (Thailand) Knight of the Order of the Royal House of Chakri, 30 July 1897
- (Kingdom of Prussia) Grand Commander's Cross of the Royal House Order of Hohenzollern, 8 May 1901
- (Empire of Japan) Grand Cordon of the Supreme Order of the Chrysanthemum, 13 April 1902
  - Collar, 30 March 1911
- (Kingdom of Saxony) Knight of the Order of the Rue Crown, October 1902
- (Austria-Hungary) Grand Cross of the Order of St. Stephen, 1902
- (French Third Republic) Grand Cross of the Legion of Honour, July 1903
- (Sweden) Knight of the Order of the Seraphim, 14 June 1905
- (Norway) Grand Cross with Collar of the Order of St. Olav, 22 June 1906
- (Grand Duchy of Hesse) Knight with Collar of the Order of the Golden Lion, 17 July 1910
- (Kingdom of Romania) Grand Cross with Collar of the Order of Carol I, 1910
- (Kingdom of Bavaria) Knight of the Order of St. Hubert, 1911
- (Denmark) Grand Commander of the Order of the Dannebrog, 18 April 1913
  - Grand Commander with Diamonds, 9 May 1914
- (Ottoman Empire) Member 1st Class with Diamonds of the Order of Osmanieh
- (Kingdom of Greece) Grand Cross of the Order of the Redeemer
- (Denmark) King Christian IX Jubilee Medal
- (Denmark) King Christian IX Centenary Medal
- King Christian IX and Queen Louise of Denmark Golden Wedding Commemorative Medal
- (Russian Empire) Knight 3rd Class of the Order of St. George, 14 March 1918
- (Portugal) Grand Cross of the Sash of the Three Orders, 1919
- Knight with Collar of the Order of Muhammad Ali, 1920
- (Estonia) Cross of Liberty, Grade I Class I, 17 June 1925
- (Portugal) Grand Cross of the Order of the Colonial Empire, 19 February 1934
- Grand Cross of the Order of San Marino
- (Ethiopian Empire) Knight with Collar of the Order of Solomon, 1935

=== Honorary foreign military appointments ===
- 1 February 1901: À la suite of the Imperial German Navy
- 26 January 1902: Colonel-in-Chief of the Rhenish Cuirassier Regiment "Count Geßler" No. 8 (Prussia)
- 24 May 1910: Admiral of the Royal Danish Navy
- Honorary Colonel of the Infantry Regiment "Zamora" No. 8 (Spain)
- 23 September 1915: Special General of the Royal Thai Army
- 29 October 1918: Gensui of the Imperial Japanese Army
- 1923: Honorary Admiral of the Swedish Navy

== Honorary degrees and offices ==
- 8 June 1893: Royal Fellow of the Royal Society, installed 6 February 1902
- 1899: Doctor of Laws (LLD), University of the Cape of Good Hope
- 1901: Doctor of Laws (LLD), University of Sydney
- 1901: Doctor of Laws (LLD), University of Toronto
- 1901: Doctor of Civil Law (DCL), Queen's University, Ontario
- 1902: Doctor of Laws (LLD), University of Wales
- 1901: Chancellor of the University of Cape Town
- 1903: Honorary degree, University of London
- 1907: Honorary degree, University of Glasgow
- 1901–1912: Chancellor of the University of the Cape of Good Hope
- 1902–1910: Chancellor of the University of Wales

== See also ==
- Style of the British Sovereign
- Title and style of the Canadian monarch
- List of titles and honours of Mary of Teck
- List of titles and honours of Edward VIII
- List of titles and honours of George VI
- List of titles and honours of Queen Elizabeth the Queen Mother
- List of titles and honours of Elizabeth II
- List of titles and honours of Prince Philip, Duke of Edinburgh
- List of titles and honours of Charles III
- List of titles and honours of Queen Camilla
- List of titles and honours of William, Prince of Wales
- List of titles and honours of Catherine, Princess of Wales
- List of titles and honours of Anne, Princess Royal
- List of titles and honours of Prince Edward, Duke of Edinburgh
- List of titles and honours of Prince Arthur, Duke of Connaught and Strathearn
