= List of titles and honours of Mary of Teck =

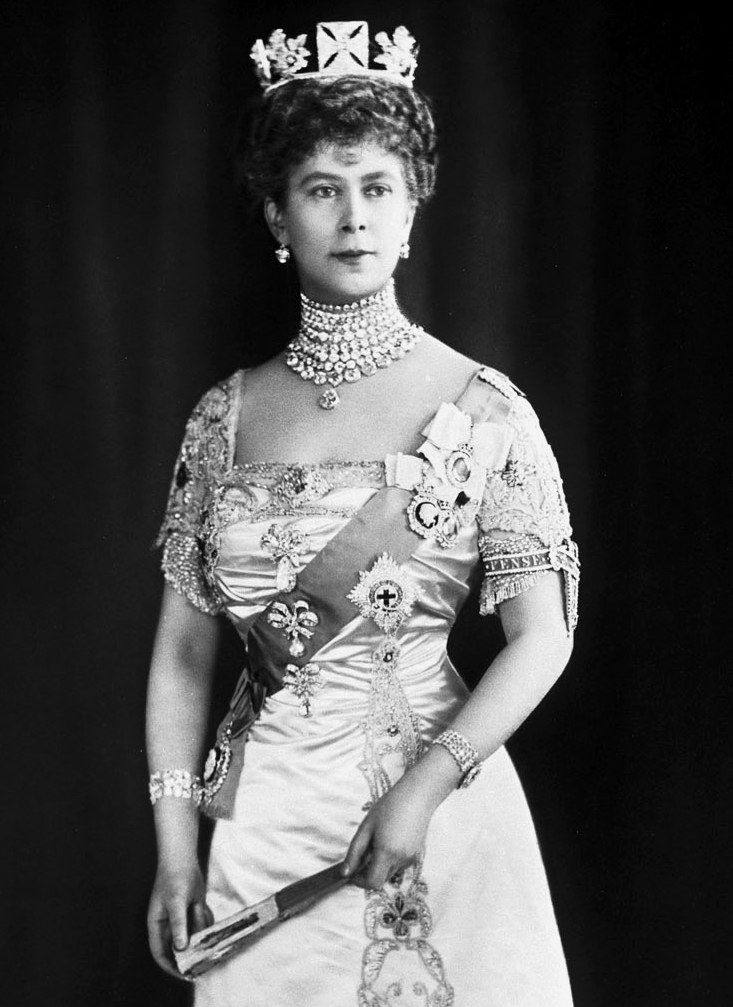
Queen Mary wearing the Garter Star, Victoria and Albert Order and the Royal Family Orders, 1912

This is a list of awards, decorations, honours, orders and titles belonging to Mary of Teck, queen consort of the United Kingdom. Where two dates are listed, then the first indicates the date of the attaining of the award or title, and the second indicates the date of its loss.

== Royal and noble titles and styles ==
Styles of Queen Mary
- Reference style: Her Majesty
- Spoken style: Your Majesty

- 26 May 1867 – 6 July 1893: Her Serene Highness Princess Victoria Mary of Teck
- 6 July 1893 – 22 January 1901: Her Royal Highness The Duchess of York
- 22 January 1901 – 9 November 1901: Her Royal Highness The Duchess of Cornwall and York
- 9 November 1901 – 6 May 1910: Her Royal Highness The Princess of Wales
- 6 May 1910 – 20 January 1936: Her Majesty The Queen
- 20 January 1936 – 24 March 1953: Her Majesty Queen Mary

=== Other ===
- 20 October 1919: Ga-no-ron-gwa ("She Loves") of the Iroquois Confederacy

== British and Commonwealth honours ==
Country	Date	Appointment	Ribbon	Post-nominal letters
British India	25 May 1889 – 24 March 1953	Companion of the Imperial Order of the Crown of India		CI
United Kingdom	6 July 1893 – 24 March 1953	Member First Class of the Royal Order of Victoria and Albert		VA
United Kingdom	May 1902 – 24 March 1953	Member of the Royal Family Order of Edward VII		
United Kingdom	9 August 1902	Recipient of the King Edward VII Coronation Medal		
United Kingdom	6 May 1910 – 24 March 1953	Member of the Royal Red Cross		RRC
England	3 June 1910 – 24 March 1953	Royal Lady of the Most Noble Order of the Garter		LG
United Kingdom	3 June 1911 – 24 March 1953	Member of the Royal Family Order of George V		
British India	14 December 1911 – 24 March 1953	Knight Grand Commander of the Most Exalted Order of the Star of India		GCSI
United Kingdom	24 August 1917 – 1936	Dame Grand Cross of the Most Excellent Order of the British Empire		GBE
United Kingdom	27 March 1936 – 24 March 1953	Grand Master and First and Principal Dame Grand Cross		GBE
United Kingdom	10 June 1927 – 24 March 1953	Dame Grand Cross of the Most Venerable Order of the Hospital of St John of Jerusalem		GCStJ
United Kingdom	23 June 1936 – 24 March 1953	Dame Grand Cross of the Royal Victorian Order		GCVO
United Kingdom	9 May 1937 – 24 March 1953	Member of the Royal Family Order of George VI		
United Kingdom	11 May 1937 – 24 March 1953	Recipient of the Royal Victorian Chain		
United Kingdom	12 May 1937 – 24 March 1953	Recipient of the King George VI Coronation Medal		
United Kingdom	25 December 1952 – 24 March 1953	Member of the Royal Family Order of Elizabeth II		
Canada	22 March 1951	Recipient of the Canadian Forces' Decoration		CD

== Foreign honours ==
Country	Award or order	Class or position	Ribbon	Year
Grand Duchy of Hesse	Grand Ducal Hessian Order of the Golden Lion	Dame		6 July 1893
Portugal	Order of Queen Saint Isabel	Dame		August 1893
Ethiopia	Order of the Star of Ethiopia	Grand Cross		8 August 1902
Austrian Empire	Imperial Austrian Order of Elizabeth	Grand Cross		1904
Persia	Imperial Order of the Sun for Ladies	2nd Class		1904
Japan	Order of the Precious Crown	Grand Cordon		28 March 1905
Denmark	Golden Wedding Badge			1906
Kingdom of Prussia	Order of Louise	1st Division		12 November 1907
Russian Empire	Imperial Order of Saint Catherine	Grand Cross		5 August 1909
Kingdom of Yugoslavia	Order of the Star of Karađorđe	Grand Cross		1916
Kingdom of Italy	Red Cross Medal			1919
Kingdom of Romania	Red Cross Medal			1919
France	National Order of the Legion of Honour	Grand Cross		16 May 1927
Egypt	Decoration of al-Kamal	In Brilliants		4 July 1927
Afghanistan	Order of the Supreme Sun	Collar		13 March 1928
Ethiopia	Order of the Queen of Sheba	Grand Cross		13 January 1932
Kingdom of Yugoslavia	Order of Saint Sava	Grand Cross		1935
Greece	Royal Family Order of Saints Olga and Sophia	Grand Cross		7 November 1938
Romania	Order of the Crown of Rumania	Grand Cross		15 November 1938

== Honorary military positions ==
Military Force	Unit	Position	Year
(German Empire) German Army	Husaren-Regiment Fürst Blücher von Wahlstatt	Chief	1913
(United Kingdom) British Army	18th Royal Hussars (Queen Mary's Own)	Colonel-in-Chief	1914–1922
(United Kingdom) British Army	Queen's Own Oxfordshire Hussars	Colonel-in-Chief	1920–1922
(United Kingdom) British Army	13th/18th Royal Hussars (Queen Mary's Own)	Colonel-in-Chief	1922
(United Kingdom) British Army	100th (Worcestershire and Oxfordshire Yeomanry) Brigade, RFA (TA)	Colonel-in-Chief	1922–1939
(United Kingdom) British Army	Queen Alexandra's Imperial Military Nursing Service	President	1926–1949
(Canada) Canadian Army	The Queen's Own Rifles of Canada	Colonel-in-Chief	1928
(United Kingdom) British Army	Queen's Royal Regiment (West Surrey)	Colonel-in-Chief	1937
(United Kingdom) British Army	63rd (Worcestershire and Oxfordshire Yeomanry) Anti-Tank Regiment, RA (TA)	Colonel-in-Chief	1939–1942
(United Kingdom) British Army	387th Field Regiment, RA (Queen's Own Oxford Hussars)	Colonel-in-Chief	1942–1950
(United Kingdom) British Army	Queen Alexandra's Royal Army Nursing Corps	Colonel-in-Chief	1949
(United Kingdom) British Army	299th (Royal Buckinghamshire Yeomanry and Queen's Own Oxford Hussars) Field Regiment, RA (TA)	Colonel-in-Chief	1950

== Honorary civil appointments ==
Degrees

Country	Date	School	Degree
Wales	1902	University of Wales	Doctor of Music (DMus)
England	1903	University of London	
Scotland	1907	University of Glasgow	
England	1921	University of Oxford	Doctor of Civil Law (DCL)
Scotland	1922	University of Aberdeen	Doctor of Laws (LLD)

Memberships and fellowships

Memberships and fellowships
Country	Date	Organisation	Position
England	1937	Worshipful Company of Basketmakers	Honorary Freeman

Freedom of the city

== Honorific eponyms ==
=== Academic institutions ===
- Queen Mary University of London
- Queen Mary College, Lahore

=== Structures ===
==== Roads, highways, and bridges ====
- England: Queensway Tunnel, between Liverpool and Birkenhead
- Canada: Queen Mary Road, in Montreal, Quebec, Canada

==== Hospitals ====
- Queen Mary Hospital (Hong Kong), Pok Fu Lam, Hong Kong
- Queen Mary Hospital (Hanmer Springs), Hanmer Springs, South Island, New Zealand
- Queen Mary Hospital, Dunedin, defunct hospital in Dunedin, South Island, New Zealand
- Queen Mary's Hospital, Roehampton, London, United Kingdom
- Queen Mary's Hospital, Sidcup, South East London, United Kingdom
- Queen Mary's Hospital, Carshalton, London, United Kingdom
- Queen Mary's Hospital for the East End, Stratford, London, United Kingdom

=== Ships ===
- HMS Queen Mary (1913): Royal Navy battlecruiser
- TS Queen Mary (1933): Clyde steamer
- RMS Queen Mary (1936): Cunard-White Star liner
- RMS Queen Mary 2 (2003): Cunard ocean liner

=== Other ===
- Queen Mary Reservoir in Surrey
- Queen Mary Land in Antarctica

== See also ==
- List of titles and honours of George V
- List of titles and honours of Edward VIII
- List of titles and honours of George VI
- List of titles and honours of Queen Elizabeth the Queen Mother
- List of titles and honours of Elizabeth II
- List of titles and honours of Prince Philip, Duke of Edinburgh
- List of titles and honours of Charles III
- List of titles and honours of Queen Camilla
- List of titles and honours of William, Prince of Wales
- List of titles and honours of Catherine, Princess of Wales
- List of titles and honours of Anne, Princess Royal
- List of titles and honours of Prince Edward, Duke of Edinburgh
- List of titles and honours of Prince Arthur, Duke of Connaught and Strathearn
