= List of titles and honours of Edward VIII =

Edward VIII received numerous decorations and honorary appointments, both during and before his time as monarch of the United Kingdom and the dominions. Of those listed below; where two dates are shown, the first indicates the date of receiving the award or title, and the second indicates the date of its loss or renunciation.

== Titles and styles ==
Styles of King Edward VIII
- Reference style: His Majesty
- Spoken style: Your Majesty

Royal standard of the Duke of Windsor

- 23 June 1894 – 28 May 1898: His Highness Prince Edward of York
- 28 May 1898 – 22 January 1901: His Royal Highness Prince Edward of York
- 22 January 1901 – 9 November 1901: His Royal Highness Prince Edward of Cornwall and York
- 9 November 1901 – 6 May 1910: His Royal Highness Prince Edward of Wales
- 6 May 1910 – 23 June 1910: His Royal Highness The Duke of Cornwall
- 23 June 1910 – 20 January 1936: His Royal Highness The Prince of Wales
  - in Scotland: His Royal Highness The Duke of Rothesay
- 20 January 1936 – 11 December 1936: His Majesty The King
- 12 December 1936 – 27 May 1937: His Royal Highness The Prince Edward
  - Edward immediately began using the title upon abdication, in accordance with George VI's declaration to his Accession Council, but the title was not formalized by Letters Patent until 27 May 1937.
- 27 May 1937 – 28 May 1972: His Royal Highness The Duke of Windsor

His full style as king was "His Majesty, Edward the Eighth, by the Grace of God, of Great Britain, Ireland, and of the British Dominions beyond the Seas, King, Defender of the Faith, Emperor of India".

== Honours ==
=== British Commonwealth and Empire honours ===
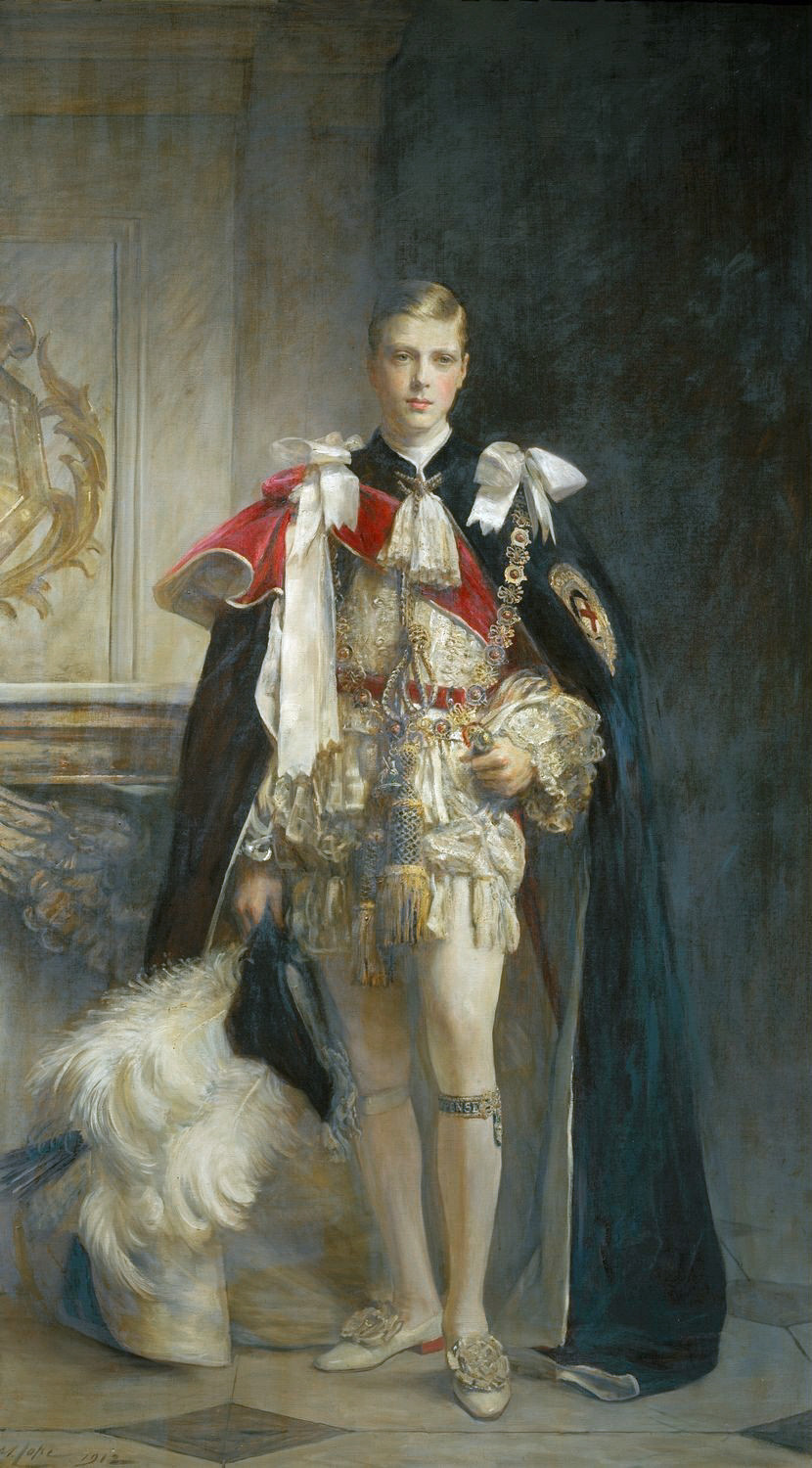
Portrait of Edward in the robes of the Order of the Garter by Arthur Stockdale Cope, 1912

- KG: Royal Knight Companion of the Most Noble Order of the Garter, 23 June 1910
- KT: Extra Knight of the Most Ancient and Most Noble Order of the Thistle, 23 June 1922
- KP: Additional Knight of the Most Illustrious Order of St Patrick, 3 June 1927
- GCB: Knight Grand Cross of the Most Honourable Order of the Bath, 1936
- GCSI: Extra Knight Grand Commander of the Most Exalted Order of the Star of India, 10 October 1921
- GCMG: Grand Master and Knight Grand Cross of the Most Distinguished Order of St Michael and St George, 24 October 1917
- GCIE: Extra Knight Grand Commander of the Most Eminent Order of the Indian Empire, 10 October 1921
- GCVO: Knight Grand Cross of the Royal Victorian Order, 13 March 1920
  - Recipient of the Royal Victorian Chain, 1921
- GBE: Grand Master and Knight Grand Cross of the Most Excellent Order of the British Empire, 4 June 1917
- ISO: Companion of the Imperial Service Order, 23 June 1910
- MC: Military Cross, 3 June 1916
- GCStJ: Bailiff Grand Cross of the Most Venerable Order of St John, 12 June 1926
  - Knight of Justice of the Most Venerable Order of St John, 2 June 1917
- PC: Privy Counsellor of the United Kingdom, 2 March 1920
- ADC(P): Personal aide-de-camp, 3 June 1919
- PC: Privy Councillor of Canada, 2 August 1927
- FRS: Royal Fellow of the Royal Society

=== Foreign honours ===
- (Grand Duchy of Mecklenburg-Strelitz) Grand Cross of the House Order of the Wendish Crown, with Crown in Ore, 1 May 1911
- (Grand Duchy of Hesse) Knight of the Grand Ducal Hessian Order of the Golden Lion, 23 June 1911
- (Spain) Knight of the Order of the Golden Fleece, 22 June 1912
- (French Third Republic) Grand Cross of the National Order of the Legion of Honour, August 1912
- (Denmark) Knight of the Order of the Elephant, 17 March 1914
- (Norway) Grand Cross of the Royal Norwegian Order of St Olav, with Collar, 6 April 1914
- (Kingdom of Italy) Knight of the Supreme Order of the Most Holy Annunciation, 21 June 1915
- (French Third Republic) Croix de Guerre, 1915
- (Russian Empire) Knight of the Order of St George, 3rd Class, 16 May 1916
- (Thailand) Knight of the Order of the Royal House of Chakri, 16 August 1917
- (Kingdom of Romania) Order of Michael the Brave, 1st Class, 1918
- (Kingdom of Italy) War Merit Cross, 1919
- (Kingdom of Egypt) Grand Cordon of the Royal Order of Muhammad Ali, 1922
- (Sweden) Knight of the Royal Order of the Seraphim, 12 November 1923
- (Kingdom of Romania) Collar of the Order of Carol I, 1924
- (Chile) Order of Merit, 1st Class, 1925
- (Bolivia) Grand Cross of the Order of the Condor of the Andes, 1931
- Grand Cross of the Order of the Sun of Peru, 1931
- (Portugal) Grand Cross of the Sash of the Two Orders, 25 April 1931 – during his visit to Lisbon
- (Brazil) Grand Cross of the National Order of the Southern Cross, 1933
- (San Marino) Grand Cross of the Order of St Agatha, 1935

=== Honorary degrees and offices ===
- 1918–1936: Chancellor of the University of Cape Town
- 1920: Doctor of Laws, University of Sydney
- 1921: Doctor of Law, University of Cambridge
- 1921: Honorary degree, University of London
- 1922: Doctor of Laws, University of Hong Kong
- 1928–1936: Master, Honourable Company of Master Mariners

== Military ranks ==
=== British Commonwealth and Empire ===
- 22 June 1911: Midshipman, Royal Navy
- 17 March 1913: Lieutenant, Royal Navy
- 8 August 1914: Second Lieutenant, 1st Battalion, Grenadier Guards, British Army
- 15 November 1914: Temporary Lieutenant, Grenadier Guards, later antedated to 11 November 1914
- 19 November 1914: Lieutenant, Grenadier Guards
- 10 March 1916: Supernumerary Captain, Grenadier Guards
- 25 February 1918: Temporary Major, British Army
- 15 April 1919: Colonel, British Army
- 8 July 1919: Captain, Royal Navy
- 5 December 1922: Group Captain, Royal Air Force
- 1 September 1930: Vice-Admiral, Royal Navy; Lieutenant-General, British Army; Air Marshal, Royal Air Force
- 1 January 1935: Admiral, Royal Navy; General, British Army; Air Chief Marshal, Royal Air Force
- 21 January 1936: Admiral of the Fleet, Royal Navy; Field Marshal, British Army; Marshal of the Royal Air Force
  - 3 September 1939: Major-General, British Military Mission in France

=== Foreign ===
- 29 January 1936: Admiral, Royal Danish Navy

== See also ==
- Style of the British Sovereign
- Title and style of the Canadian monarch
- List of titles and honours of Mary of Teck
- List of titles and honours of George V
- List of titles and honours of George VI
- List of titles and honours of Queen Elizabeth the Queen Mother
- List of titles and honours of Elizabeth II
- List of titles and honours of Prince Philip, Duke of Edinburgh
- List of titles and honours of Charles III
- List of titles and honours of Queen Camilla
- List of titles and honours of William, Prince of Wales
- List of titles and honours of Catherine, Princess of Wales
- List of titles and honours of Anne, Princess Royal
- List of titles and honours of Prince Edward, Duke of Edinburgh
- List of titles and honours of Prince Arthur, Duke of Connaught and Strathearn
