= List of titles and honours of George VI =

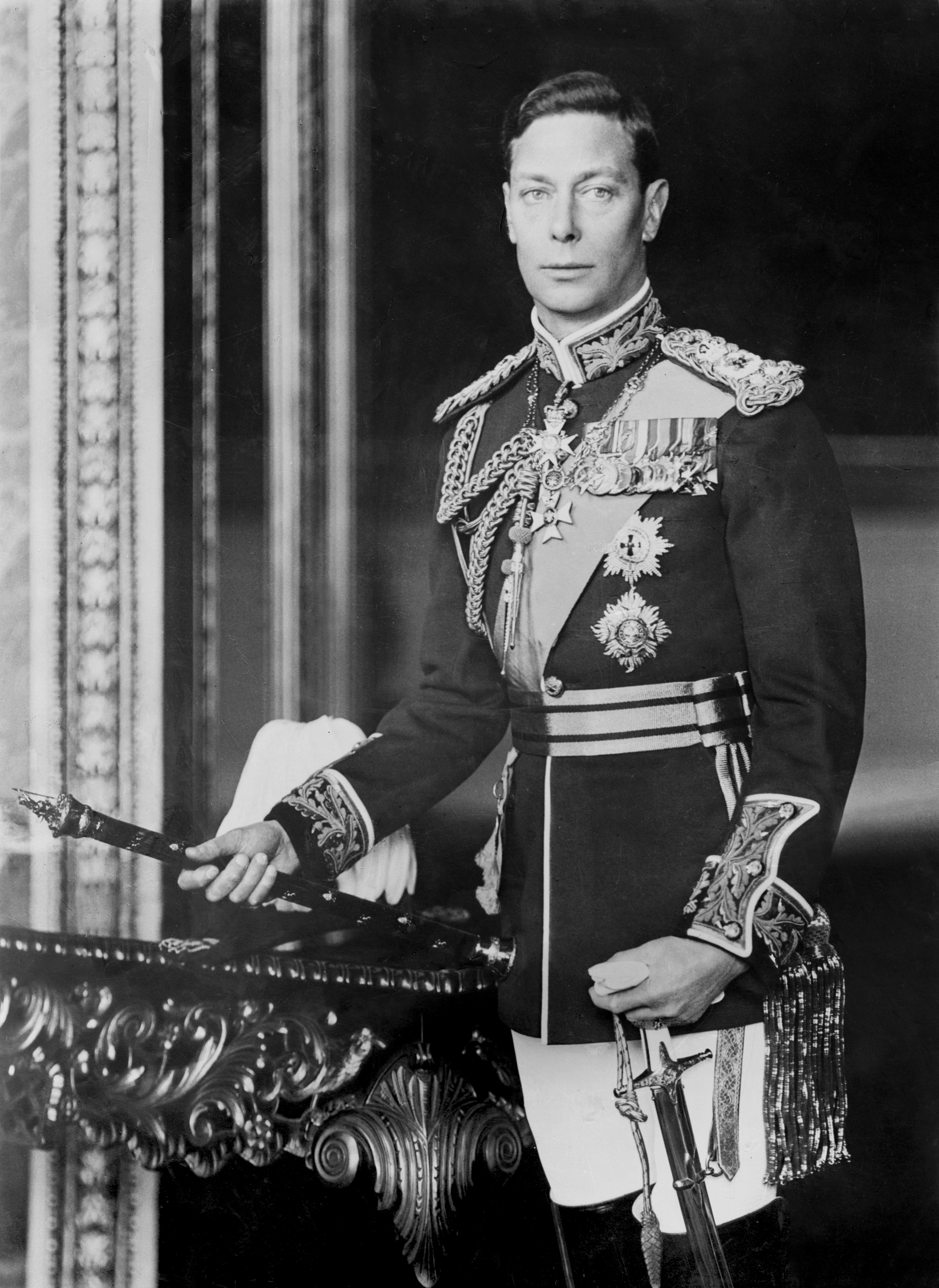
George VI in 1938

George VI received numerous decorations and honorary appointments, both during and before his time as monarch of the United Kingdom and the dominions. Of those listed below; where two dates are shown, the first indicates the date of receiving the award or title, and the second indicates the date of its loss or renunciation.

== Titles, styles, and honours ==
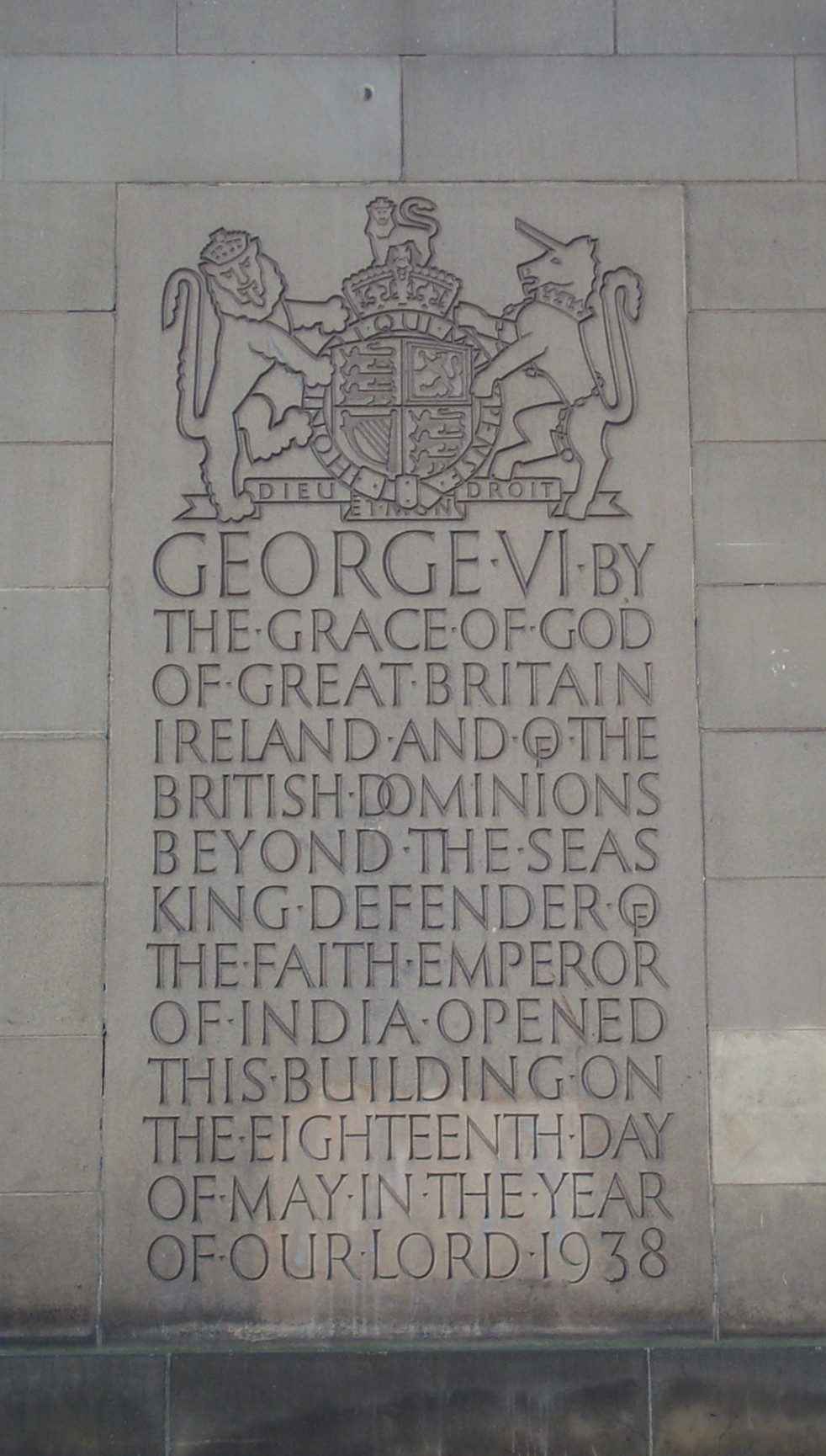
A foundation plaque at Manchester Town Hall records the titles of George VI as King-Emperor

Styles of King George VI
- Reference style: His Majesty
- Spoken style: Your Majesty

=== Titles and styles ===
George VI was from birth a Prince of the United Kingdom, and was subsequently created a royal duke. It was as a duke that he succeeded his brother, King Edward VIII, to the throne.

- 14 December 1895 – 28 May 1898: His Highness Prince Albert of York
- 28 May 1898 – 22 January 1901: His Royal Highness Prince Albert of York
- 22 January 1901 – 9 November 1901: His Royal Highness Prince Albert of Cornwall and York
- 9 November 1901 – 6 May 1910: His Royal Highness Prince Albert of Wales
- 6 May 1910 – 3 June 1920: His Royal Highness The Prince Albert
- 3 June 1920 – 11 December 1936: His Royal Highness The Duke of York
  - Subsidiary titles: Earl of Inverness and Baron Killarney
- 11 December 1936 – 6 February 1952: His Majesty The King

=== Titles vested in the Crown ===
Certain titles are borne and held by the reigning sovereign.

Isle of Man

- 11 December 1936 – 6 February 1952: His Majesty The King, Lord of Mann

Church of England

- 11 December 1936 – 6 February 1952: Defender of the Faith and Supreme Governor of the Church of England

Other titles traditionally attributed to the reigning sovereign are Duke of Lancaster, to reflect that the Duchy of Lancaster is a private estate of the sovereign, (Note: The legal basis for the sovereign's use of the title has been disputed. George VI's father, George V was given legal advice that it was "extremely unlikely" that he was, in fact, the Duke of Lancaster.) and Duke of Normandy in the sovereign's capacity as head of state of the Bailiwicks of Jersey and Guernsey. (Note: There is no basis in law for the title and the legal basis of the monarch's sovereignty is as successor to the Dukes of Normandy. Jersey and Guernsey and the other Channel Islands were part of the Duchy of Normandy when the Duke of Normandy was also the king of England. Under the Treaty of Paris (1259) the king of England renounced his claims to the Duchy but retained possession of the islands.)

=== Titles held personally ===
George VI held certain titles in a personal capacity, either by virtue of birth, or otherwise.

House of Saxe-Coburg and Gotha

- 14 December 1895 – 17 July 1917: Prince of Saxe-Coburg and Gotha, Duke of Saxony (Note: George VI held his German titles by virtue of being a descendant of the Prince Consort. All German degrees, styles, dignities, titles, honors, and appellations were renounced on 17 July 1917 by George V for himself, his descendants, and all other descendants of Queen Victoria. An amendment to the House laws of Saxe-Coburg and Gotha barred any descendant of a member of the ducal house who was in 1917 a national of a country which waged war against the German Empire from succeeding to the ducal throne, effectively removing any remote succession rights that the British royalty still held by virtue of the partial renunciation by Edward VII when he was Prince of Wales.)

Commonwealth of Nations

- Late-April 1949 – 6 February 1952: Head of the Commonwealth

=== Title in the dominions and India ===
The Dominions were self-governing entities which had the as their respective head of state the same person as was the British sovereign. These Dominions typically used the style and title of the sovereign as proclaimed in the United Kingdom, which, from the reign of Edward VII came to include the phrase, “and of the British Dominions beyond the Seas”, (Note: Later dropped in its entirety in favour of “and of Her other Realms and Territories” during the reign of Elizabeth II.) signifying their reign over said Dominions. However, the sovereign reigned in these Dominions in a capacity independent from their position as monarch of the United Kingdom, similar in meaning and usage to, but not the same as modern-day Commonwealth realms, in that they lacked a separate title for each Dominion, until the reign of Elizabeth II. George VI's reign in the Dominions does not completely match his reign in the United Kingdom and his role as monarch in the Irish Free State is debated.

With reference to the British Raj, George VI as sovereign was formally styled His Imperial Majesty the King, Emperor of India, in official Government of India publications. This style, along with the general style of His Majesty the King Emperor, was used until the independence and partition of India in 1947. Per the terms of the Indian Independence Act, the imperial title was to be abolished. However, George VI issued a royal proclamation for that purpose and to that effect only on 22 June 1948, effectively reigning as king in the newly created Dominions of India and Pakistan whilst still bearing the imperial title for himself and his consort.

The title of Kaisar-i-Hind was coined in 1876 by the orientalist G. W. Leitner as the imperial title for the sovereign and was also employed in an official capacity, most notably to denote Crown property in India. This title continues to persist as a placeholder to the modern day in official records dating to the British era, despite the prohibition and deprecation of the use of the said title and all its variants for any and all purposes. Its usage is to be so understood as to denote the Government of India per the relevant provisions of the Government Grants Act, read alongside and in the context of the Transfer of Property Act and the Repealing and Amending (Second) Act.

== Military ranks ==
Flag	Date	Rank	Branch	Ref
Australia
(United Kingdom)	2 June 1938	Admiral of the Fleet	Royal Australian Navy	
(Australia)	2 June 1938	Field Marshal	Australian Army	
	2 June 1938	Marshal of the Royal Australian Air Force	Royal Australian Air Force	
United Kingdom
(United Kingdom)	15 May 1916	Sub-Lieutenant	Royal Navy	
(United Kingdom)	29 December 1918	Temporary Captain and Staff Officer (3rd Class, Air)	Royal Air Force	
(United Kingdom)	1 August 1919	Flight Lieutenant	Royal Air Force	
(United Kingdom)	1 November 1919	Squadron Leader	Royal Air Force	
(United Kingdom)	31 December 1920	Commander	Royal Navy	
(United Kingdom)	1 June 1920	Wing Commander	Royal Air Force	
(United Kingdom)	30 June 1921	Group Captain	Royal Air Force	
(United Kingdom)	3 June 1932	Rear Admiral	Royal Navy	
(United Kingdom)	3 June 1932	Major General	British Army	
(United Kingdom)	3 June 1932	Air Vice-Marshal	Royal Air Force	
(United Kingdom)	1 January 1936	Vice Admiral	Royal Navy	
(United Kingdom)	1 January 1936	Lieutenant General	British Army	
(United Kingdom)	1 January 1936	Air Marshal	Royal Air Force	
(United Kingdom)	21 January 1936	Admiral	Royal Navy	
(United Kingdom)	21 January 1936	General	British Army	
(United Kingdom)	11 December 1936	Admiral of the Fleet	Royal Navy	
(United Kingdom)	11 December 1936	Field Marshal	British Army	
(United Kingdom)	11 December 1936	Marshal of the Royal Air Force	Royal Air Force	
(United Kingdom)	8 October 1948	Captain General Royal Marines	Royal Marines	

== Orders and decorations ==
=== British ===
==== Orders of Chivalry ====
- (England) KG: Royal Knight Companion of the Most Noble Order of the Garter, 14 December 1916
- (Scotland) KT: Extra Knight of the Most Ancient and Most Noble Order of the Thistle, 1 May 1923
- KP: Knight of the Most Illustrious Order of Saint Patrick, 17 March 1936
- (United Kingdom) GCMG: Knight Grand Cross of the Most Distinguished Order of Saint Michael and Saint George
- GCVO: Knight Grand Cross of the Royal Victorian Order, 1 January 1921

==== Campaign Medals ====
- (United Kingdom) 1914–15 Star, December 1918
- (United Kingdom) British War Medal, 26 July 1919
- (United Kingdom) Victory Medal with Mention in Despatches, 1 September 1919
- (United Kingdom) 1939-1945 Star, 8 July 1943
- (United Kingdom) Italy Star, May 1945
- (United Kingdom) France and Germany Star, May 1945
- (United Kingdom) Defence Medal, May 1945
- (United Kingdom) War Medal 1939-1945, 16 August 1945

==== Coronation/Jubilee medals ====
- (United Kingdom) Queen Victoria Diamond Jubilee Medal, 20 June 1897
- (United Kingdom) King Edward VII Coronation Medal, 9 August 1902
- (United Kingdom) King George V Coronation Medal, 22 June 1911
- (United Kingdom) King George V Silver Jubilee Medal, 6 May 1935

=== Foreign ===
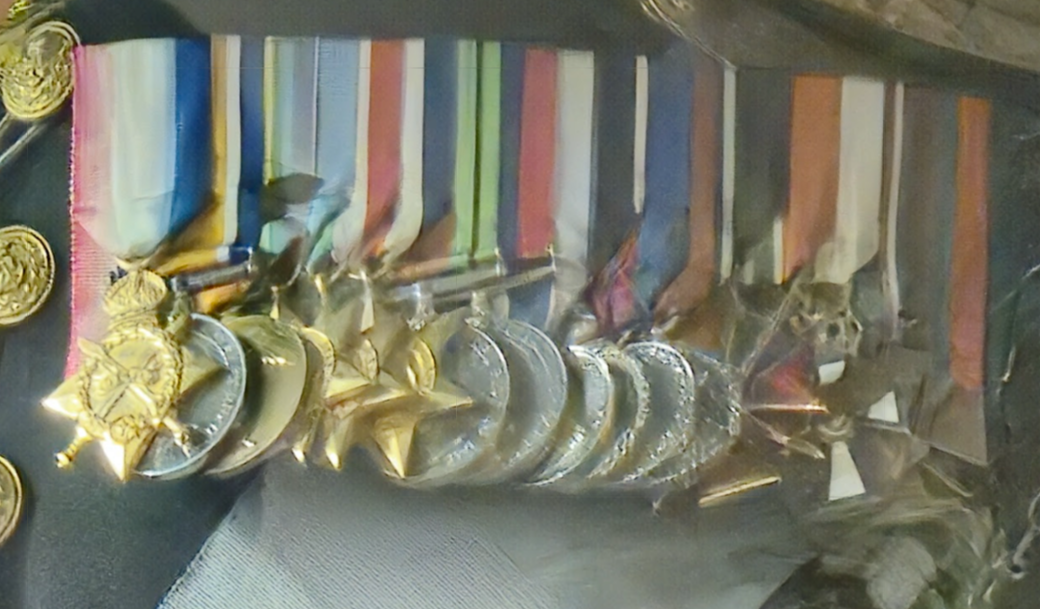
The decorations of George VI on display at BRNC Dartmouth.

==== Appointments ====
- (Russian Empire) Knight 4th Class with Swords of the Imperial Order of Saint Prince Vladimir, 5 June 1917
- (Kingdom of Italy) Knight of the Military Order of Savoy, 11 August 1917
- (Kingdom of Yugoslavia) Grand Cross of the Royal Order of the White Eagle, 1918
- (France) Grand Cross of the National Order of the Legion of Honour, 1919
- (Denmark) RE: Knight of the Order of the Elephant, 30 November 1920
- (Kingdom of Romania) Grand Cross with Collar of the Order of Carol I, 18 October 1922
- (Norway) StkStOO m kjede: Grand Cross with Collar of the Royal Norwegian Order of Saint Olav, 26 April 1923
- (San Marino) Grand Cross of the Civil and Military Equestrian Order of Saint Marinus, 20 February 1937
- (Sweden) RSerafO: Knight of the Royal Order of the Seraphim, 10 May 1937
- (Thailand) MCK: Knight of the Most Illustrious Order of the Royal House of Chakri, 2 July 1938
- (Portugal) BTO: Grand Cross of the Riband of the Three Military Orders, 2 May 1939
- (Kingdom of Yugoslavia) Grand Cross of the Order of the Star of Karađorđe, 19 July 1939
- (Netherlands) MWO: Grand Cross of the Military William Order, 1 July 1946
- (Nepal) Commanding General of Nepali Army, 24 September 1946
- (Monaco) Grand Cross of the Order of Saint-Charles, 13 November 1947
- (Denmark) SKmd: Grand Commander of the Order of the Dannebrog, 8 May 1951
- (France) Member of the Order of Liberation, 2 April 1960 (posthumous)

==== Decorations ====
- (Norway) War Cross
- (Kingdom of Greece) Cross of Valour
- (United States) European–African–Middle Eastern Campaign Medal
- (France) Croix de Guerre 1939–1945 with bronze palm

=== Undress ribbons ===
The undress ribbons worn by George VI in undress uniform were as follows:

Order of the Bath		Order of the Star of India	Order of St Michael and St George
Order of the Indian Empire	Royal Victorian Order	Order of the British Empire	1914–15 Star
British War Medal	Victory Medal with Mention in Despatches	1939-1945 Star	Italy Star
France and Germany Star	Defence Medal	War Medal 1939-1945	Queen Victoria Diamond Jubilee Medal
King Edward VII Coronation Medal	King George V Coronation Medal	King George V Silver Jubilee Medal	Norwegian War Cross
Greek Cross of Valour	American European–African–Middle Eastern Campaign Medal	Croix de Guerre 1939–1945 with bronze palm	Russian Imperial Order of Saint Prince Vladimir

=== Honorary appointments ===
==== Personal Aide-de-Camp ====
- King George V, 5 June 1919
- King Edward VIII, 26 June 1936

== Civil ==
=== Privy Counsellor ===
- Member of the His Majesty's Most Honourable Privy Council, 25 June 1925

=== Freedom of the City ===
- (City of London) London, 28 October 1919
- Londonderry, 1924
- (Scotland) Glasgow, 26 October 1926
- (Scotland) Stirling, 29 October 1928
- (England) Ilford, 1929
- (Scotland) Perth, 10 August 1935

== Honorary degrees ==
- Doctor of Laws, University of Sydney, 1927
- Doctor of Laws, University of Glasgow, 1932

== Honorific eponyms ==
A number of geographical features, roads, and institutions are named after George VI. These include King George Hospital in London; King George VI Reservoir in Surrey, United Kingdom; King George Highway and King George Boulevard in Surrey, British Columbia; Kingsway in Edmonton; George VI Sound in Antarctica; and the King George VI Chase, a horse race in the United Kingdom.

The fourth future Dreadnought-class submarine will be named HMS King George VI.

== See also ==
- Style of the British Sovereign
- Title and style of the Canadian monarch
- List of titles and honours of Queen Elizabeth the Queen Mother
- List of titles and honours of Elizabeth II
- List of titles and honours of Prince Philip, Duke of Edinburgh
- List of titles and honours of George V
- List of titles and honours of Mary of Teck
- List of titles and honours of Edward VIII
- List of titles and honours of Charles III
- List of titles and honours of Queen Camilla
- List of titles and honours of William, Prince of Wales
- List of titles and honours of Catherine, Princess of Wales
- List of titles and honours of Anne, Princess Royal
- List of titles and honours of Prince Edward, Duke of Edinburgh
- List of titles and honours of Prince Arthur, Duke of Connaught and Strathearn
