= Rosa 'William and Catherine' =

Rose cultivar

Rosa William and Catherine
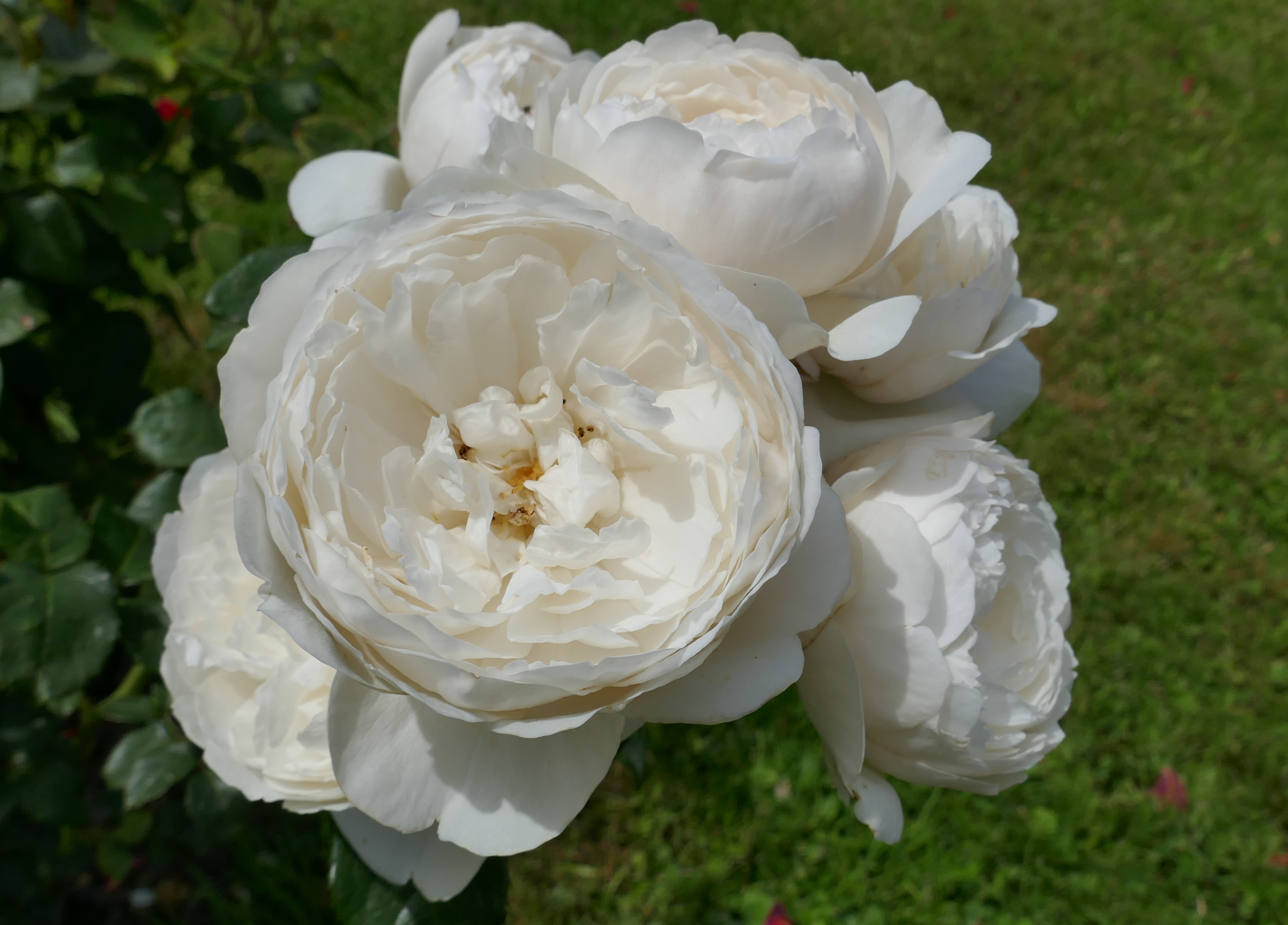
- Cultivar group: Modern shrub / English rose
- Cultivar: 'William and Catherine'
- Marketing names: 'AUSrapper'
- Breeder: David C. H. Austin
- Origin: United Kingdom, 2011

Rosa 'William and Catherine' is a white shrub rose introduced into the United Kingdom in 2011. It is a cultivar developed by the British rose breeder, David C. H. Austin. 'William and Catherine' was named in celebration of the wedding of Prince William and Catherine Middleton. The rose is described as having "white, shallowly cupped, full petalled" blooms and a moderate to strong fragrance of pure myrrh. The flowers develop from creamy orange buds and reach an average diameter of 8 centimetres (3.1 in), while the shrub reaches a height of 125 centimetres (49 in) at a width of 90 centimetres (35 in).
