= Military service by British royalty =

Many members of the British royal family have seen service in the British Armed Forces or other Commonwealth militaries, and others hold honorary ranks or positions. This is a list detailing formal military service by members of the British royal family.

There is also a list of military titles, service appointments, and various job titles within the royal family, which is listed below. These roles are honorary and may, or may not, also be held by Royals who are ex-military or serving military persons.

For example, Princess Anne, whilst not having any military service, holds many ranks and roles within the British Armed Forces.

== List ==
The honorary ranks and titles are included in a separate column. The "rank whilst active" column dictates the rank worn and held whilst the person was serving with the armed forces and the "current rank worn" column denotes any rank worn currently (including honorary rank and promotions). Members of the royal family receive regular promotions even after their active service has ended.

=== Key ===
A number of abbreviations, acronyms, and initialisms are used, to save space:

- RN - Royal Navy
- RNR - Royal Navy Reserve
- RNVR - Royal Naval Volunteer Reserve
- RM - Royal Marines
- RAF - Royal Air Force
- MC - Military Cross

=== Living members of the royal family ===
Individuals are sorted by the earliest year of service.

Name of royal	Branch of service	Rank whilst active	Years of service	Current rank worn	Wartime service	Unit	Military training and qualifications	Medals	Appointments and other roles
Prince Edward, Duke of Kent as Colonel of the Scots Guards (2013)	British Army	(United Kingdom) Lieutenant-Colonel	1955–1976 (Ret'd)	(United Kingdom) Field Marshal and	None	Royal Scots Greys	Royal Military Academy Sandhurst RAF pilot's flying badge/brevet (wings)		Personal Aide-de-Camp to The Queen, Colonel of the Scots Guards, Colonel-in-Chief of the Royal Regiment of Fusiliers, Royal Colonel of 1st Battalion The Rifles, Colonel-in-Chief of the Lorne Scots Regiment, Canada, Deputy Colonel-in-Chief of the Royal Scots Dragoon Guards, Honorary Air Chief Marshal and Honorary Air Commodore of RAF Leuchars.
Prince Edward, Duke of Kent as Colonel of the Scots Guards (2013)	British Army	(United Kingdom) Lieutenant-Colonel	1955–1976 (Ret'd)	(United Kingdom) Air Chief Marshal	None	Royal Scots Greys	Royal Military Academy Sandhurst RAF pilot's flying badge/brevet (wings)		Personal Aide-de-Camp to The Queen, Colonel of the Scots Guards, Colonel-in-Chief of the Royal Regiment of Fusiliers, Royal Colonel of 1st Battalion The Rifles, Colonel-in-Chief of the Lorne Scots Regiment, Canada, Deputy Colonel-in-Chief of the Royal Scots Dragoon Guards, Honorary Air Chief Marshal and Honorary Air Commodore of RAF Leuchars.
Prince Michael of Kent as an Honorary Vice-Admiral, Royal Naval Reserve	British Army	(United Kingdom) Major (Ret'd)	1963–1981	(United Kingdom) Vice-Admiral	None	11th Hussars (Prince Albert's Own)	Royal Military Academy Sandhurst Prince Michael is a qualified military pilot and wears the respective service's pilot badge with their uniform, i.e. when he is in RN uniform, he wears the Fleet Air Arm badge, likewise with Army - Army Air Corps wings and RAF - RAF wings		Honorary Vice Admiral, Royal Naval Reserve, Colonel-in-Chief of The Essex and Kent Scottish (Canadian Forces), Senior Colonel of the King's Royal Hussars, Royal Honorary Colonel of the Honourable Artillery Company
Prince Michael of Kent as an Honorary Vice-Admiral, Royal Naval Reserve	British Army	(United Kingdom) Major (Ret'd)	1963–1981	(United Kingdom) Colonel	None	11th Hussars (Prince Albert's Own)	Royal Military Academy Sandhurst Prince Michael is a qualified military pilot and wears the respective service's pilot badge with their uniform, i.e. when he is in RN uniform, he wears the Fleet Air Arm badge, likewise with Army - Army Air Corps wings and RAF - RAF wings		Honorary Vice Admiral, Royal Naval Reserve, Colonel-in-Chief of The Essex and Kent Scottish (Canadian Forces), Senior Colonel of the King's Royal Hussars, Royal Honorary Colonel of the Honourable Artillery Company
Prince Michael of Kent as an Honorary Vice-Admiral, Royal Naval Reserve	British Army	(United Kingdom) Major (Ret'd)	1963–1981	(United Kingdom) Air Marshal	None	11th Hussars (Prince Albert's Own)	Royal Military Academy Sandhurst Prince Michael is a qualified military pilot and wears the respective service's pilot badge with their uniform, i.e. when he is in RN uniform, he wears the Fleet Air Arm badge, likewise with Army - Army Air Corps wings and RAF - RAF wings		Honorary Vice Admiral, Royal Naval Reserve, Colonel-in-Chief of The Essex and Kent Scottish (Canadian Forces), Senior Colonel of the King's Royal Hussars, Royal Honorary Colonel of the Honourable Artillery Company
Charles III of the United Kingdom as Field marshal of the British Army (2024)	British Army	(United Kingdom) Commander	1971–1976	(United Kingdom) Field Marshal	None	845 Naval Air Squadron	Royal Naval College, Dartmouth Commando Training Centre Royal Marines Royal Air Force College, Cranwell Parachutist Badge RAF pilot's flying badge/brevet (wings)		Field Marshal, Colonel-in-Chief, Colonel, Honorary Air Commodore, Air Commodore-in-Chief, Deputy Colonel-in-Chief, Royal Honorary Colonel, Royal Colonel, and Honorary Commodore of at least 32 military formations throughout the Commonwealth of Nations
Charles III of the United Kingdom as Field marshal of the British Army (2024)	RN, and RAF	(United Kingdom) Commander	1971–1976	(United Kingdom) Admiral of the Fleet,	None	845 Naval Air Squadron	Royal Naval College, Dartmouth Commando Training Centre Royal Marines Royal Air Force College, Cranwell Parachutist Badge RAF pilot's flying badge/brevet (wings)		Field Marshal, Colonel-in-Chief, Colonel, Honorary Air Commodore, Air Commodore-in-Chief, Deputy Colonel-in-Chief, Royal Honorary Colonel, Royal Colonel, and Honorary Commodore of at least 32 military formations throughout the Commonwealth of Nations
Charles III of the United Kingdom as Field marshal of the British Army (2024)	RN, and RAF	(United Kingdom) Flight Lieutenant	1971–1976	(United Kingdom) Marshal of the Royal Air Force	None	845 Naval Air Squadron	Royal Naval College, Dartmouth Commando Training Centre Royal Marines Royal Air Force College, Cranwell Parachutist Badge RAF pilot's flying badge/brevet (wings)		Field Marshal, Colonel-in-Chief, Colonel, Honorary Air Commodore, Air Commodore-in-Chief, Deputy Colonel-in-Chief, Royal Honorary Colonel, Royal Colonel, and Honorary Commodore of at least 32 military formations throughout the Commonwealth of Nations
Andrew Mountbatten-Windsor as Colonel-in-Chief of the Yorkshire Regiment	RN, and RAF	(United Kingdom) Commander (Ret'd)	1980–2001	(United Kingdom) Commander (Ret'd)	Falklands War	815 Naval Air Squadron	Royal Naval College, Dartmouth Commando Training Centre Royal Marines Fleet Air Arm pilot's wings Parachutist Badge		(these titles have been returned to the monarch) Admiral of the Sea Cadet Corps, Commodore in Chief of the Fleet Air Arm, Honorary Air Commodore Royal Air Force Lossiemouth, Honorary Vice Admiral, Colonel-in-Chief of various units in the Canadian Forces, Colonel-in-Chief and Royal Colonel of various regiments in the British Armed Forces and Colonel of the Grenadier Guards. Personal Aide-de-Camp
Andrew Mountbatten-Windsor as Colonel-in-Chief of the Yorkshire Regiment	RN, and RAF	(United Kingdom) Commander (Ret'd)	1980–2001	(United Kingdom) Air Commodore	Falklands War	815 Naval Air Squadron	Royal Naval College, Dartmouth Commando Training Centre Royal Marines Fleet Air Arm pilot's wings Parachutist Badge		(these titles have been returned to the monarch) Admiral of the Sea Cadet Corps, Commodore in Chief of the Fleet Air Arm, Honorary Air Commodore Royal Air Force Lossiemouth, Honorary Vice Admiral, Colonel-in-Chief of various units in the Canadian Forces, Colonel-in-Chief and Royal Colonel of various regiments in the British Armed Forces and Colonel of the Grenadier Guards. Personal Aide-de-Camp
Prince Edward, Duke of Edinburgh as Commodore-in-Chief of the Royal Fleet Auxiliary	RM	(United Kingdom) Acting Lieutenant (withdrew from training)	1986–1987	See appointments	None	N/A	Commando Training Centre Royal Marines (did not finish)		Royal Honorary Colonel, of the Royal Wessex Yeomanry; Royal Colonel, of the 2nd Battalion, The Rifles; Commodore-in-Chief, of the Royal Fleet Auxiliary; Honorary Air Commodore Royal Air Force Waddington; Colonel-in-Chief, of (Canada); The Hastings and Prince Edward Regiment; Colonel-in-Chief, of (Canada) The Prince Edward Island Regiment; Colonel-in-Chief, of (Canada) the Saskatchewan Dragoons
Alexander Windsor, Earl of Ulster	British Army	(United Kingdom) Major	1998–2008	Major (Ret'd)	Kosovo War, Iraq War	King's Royal Hussars	Royal Military College Sandhurst		None
William, Prince of Wales as Colonel of the Welsh Guards (2023)	British Army	(United Kingdom) Lieutenant Colonel	2005–2013	(United Kingdom) Lieutenant Colonel	None	Blues and Royals, No. 22 Squadron (RAF Search and Rescue Force)	Royal Military Academy Sandhurst; RAF Cranwell and shorter training course at Britannia Royal Naval College RAF pilot's flying badge/brevet (wings)		Commodore-in-Chief of HMNB Clyde; Commodore-in-Chief of the Royal Navy Submarine Service; Commodore-in-Chief of Scotland; Honorary Air Commandant of RAF Valley; Colonel of the Welsh Guards; Colonel-in-Chief of Army Air Corps; Colonel-in-Chief of The Mercian Regiment
William, Prince of Wales as Colonel of the Welsh Guards (2023)	RN	(United Kingdom) Commander RN	2005–2013	(United Kingdom) Commander	None	Blues and Royals, No. 22 Squadron (RAF Search and Rescue Force)	Royal Military Academy Sandhurst; RAF Cranwell and shorter training course at Britannia Royal Naval College RAF pilot's flying badge/brevet (wings)		Commodore-in-Chief of HMNB Clyde; Commodore-in-Chief of the Royal Navy Submarine Service; Commodore-in-Chief of Scotland; Honorary Air Commandant of RAF Valley; Colonel of the Welsh Guards; Colonel-in-Chief of Army Air Corps; Colonel-in-Chief of The Mercian Regiment
William, Prince of Wales as Colonel of the Welsh Guards (2023)	RAF	(United Kingdom) Wing Commander	2005–2013	(United Kingdom) Wing Commander	None	Blues and Royals, No. 22 Squadron (RAF Search and Rescue Force)	Royal Military Academy Sandhurst; RAF Cranwell and shorter training course at Britannia Royal Naval College RAF pilot's flying badge/brevet (wings)		Commodore-in-Chief of HMNB Clyde; Commodore-in-Chief of the Royal Navy Submarine Service; Commodore-in-Chief of Scotland; Honorary Air Commandant of RAF Valley; Colonel of the Welsh Guards; Colonel-in-Chief of Army Air Corps; Colonel-in-Chief of The Mercian Regiment
Prince Harry, Duke of Sussex as a Captain in Household Cavalry Regiment (Blues and Royals) (2013)	British Army	(United Kingdom) Captain	2005–2015	(United Kingdom) Major, (United Kingdom) Squadron Leader	Afghanistan	Blues and Royals, Household Cavalry, 1st Mechanised Brigade of the 3rd Mechanised Division, Army Air Corps, 662 Squadron of 3 Regiment	Royal Military Academy Sandhurst, Forward Air Controller Army Air Corps Pilot brevet RAF Regiment Shoulder Flash		(these titles have been returned to the monarch) Canadian Ranger; Captain General Royal Marines; Honorary Air Commandant of RAF Honington; Commodore-in-Chief of Small Ships and Diving

=== Deceased members of the royal family ===
Individuals are sorted by their earliest year of service.

Name of royal
Branch of service
Rank whilst active
Years of service
Last rank worn
Wartime service
Unit
Military training and qualifications
Medals
Appointments and other roles
William IV of the United Kingdom†

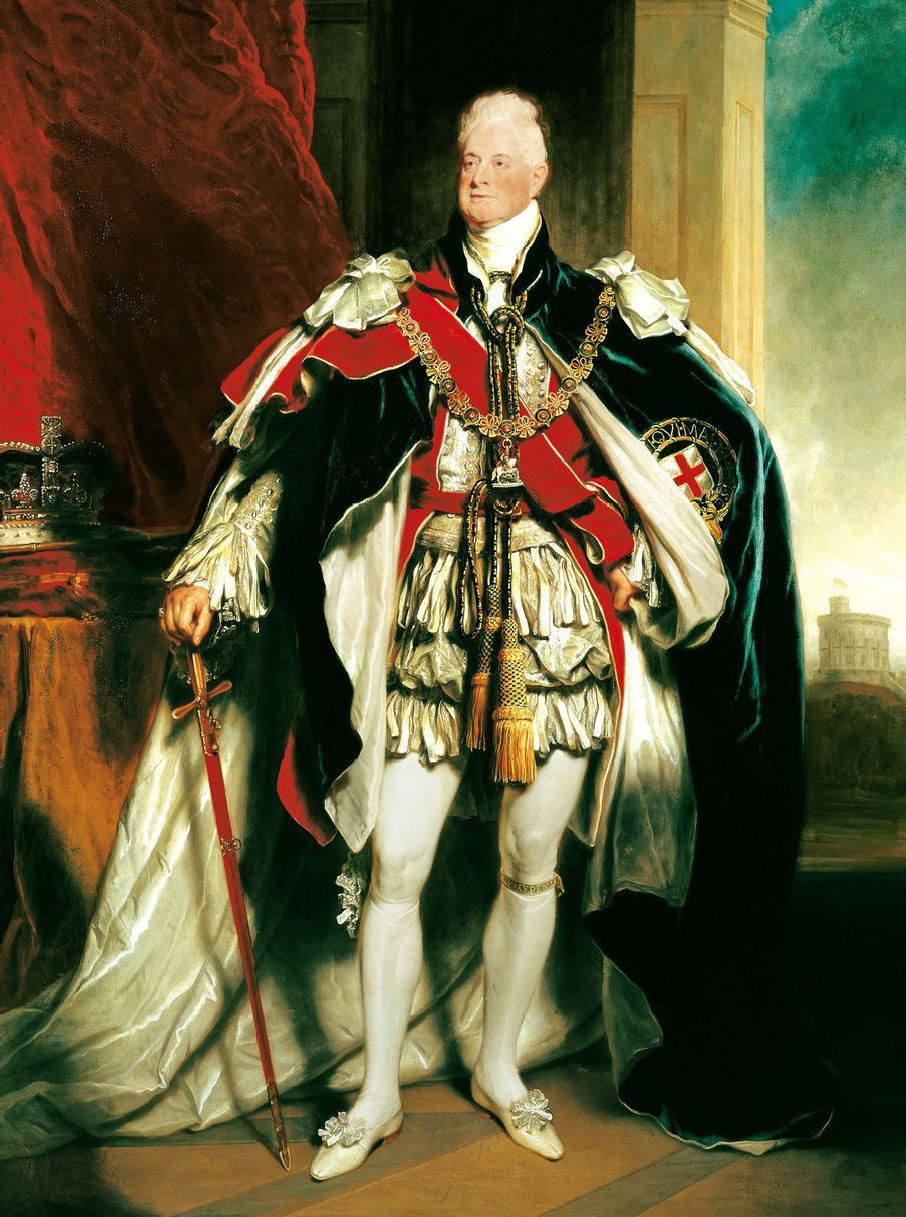

RN
(United Kingdom) Rear-Admiral
1780–1789
N/A
American War of Independence
HMS Andromeda, HMS Pegasus
None
None
General of the British Army/Admiral of the Royal Navy
Louis Mountbatten, 1st Marquess of Milford Haven†

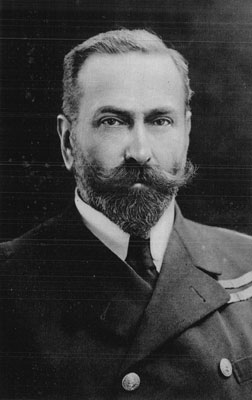
The Marquess of Milford Haven

(United Kingdom) Admiral of the Fleet
1868–1914

Anglo-Egyptian War, First World War

HMS Royal Alfred
Knight Grand Cross of the Order of the Bath, Knight Grand Cross of the Royal Victorian Order, Knight Commander of the Order of St Michael and St George
First Sea Lord
George V of the United Kingdom†

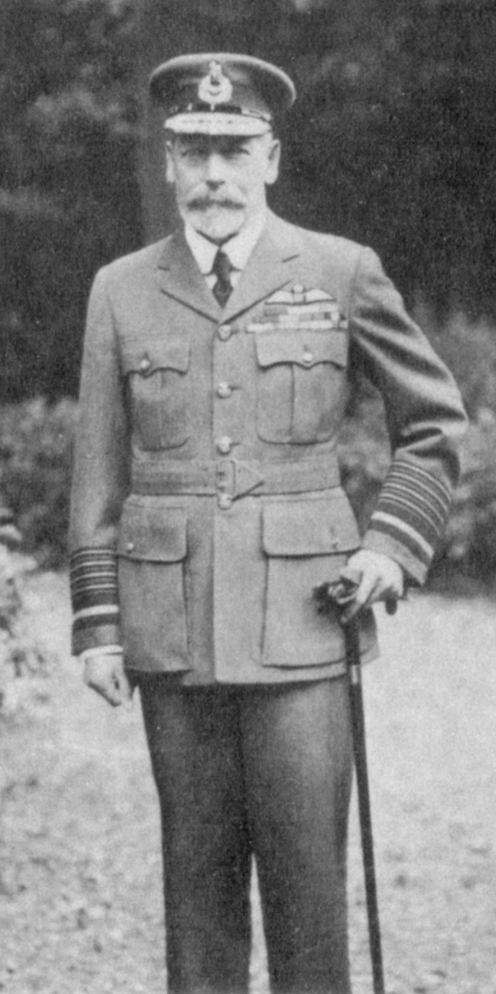
as Marshal of the Royal Air Force (1935)

(United Kingdom) Commander
1877–1891
N/A
None
HMS Bacchante
None
None
Admiral of the Fleet of the Royal Navy, Field Marshal of the British Army and Marshal of the Royal Air Force
George Mountbatten, 2nd Marquess of Milford Haven†

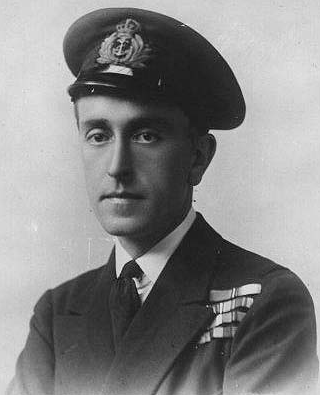
The Marquess of Milford Haven

(United Kingdom) Captain
1904–1937

First World War

Royal Naval College, Dartmouth
Knight Commander of the Royal Victorian Order Order of St Vladimir, 4th class, with Swords, Knight of the Military Order of Savoy,

Knight Grand Cross of the Royal Victorian Order

George VI of the United Kingdom†

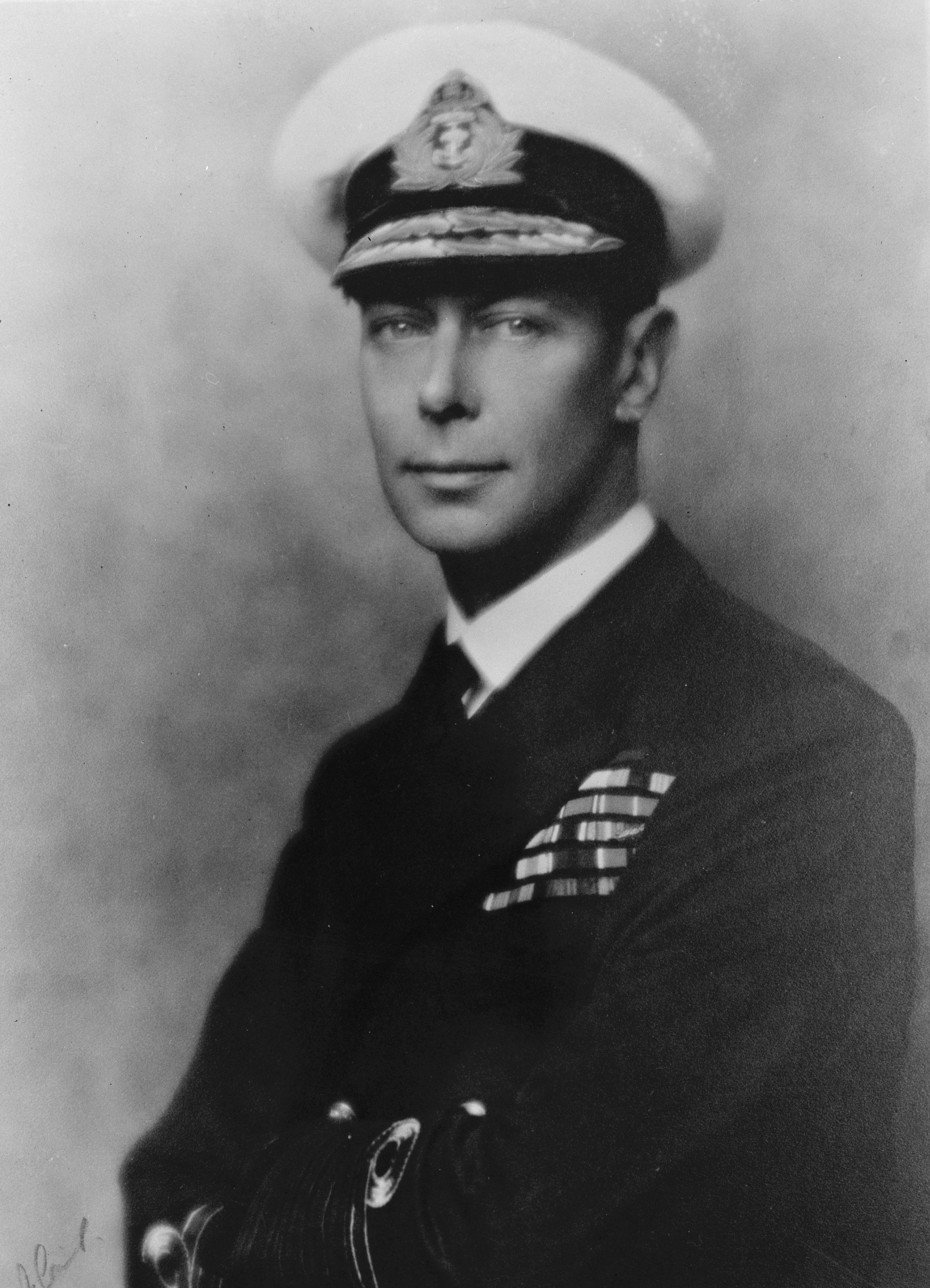
as Admiral of the Fleet during the Second World War

RN, RAF
(United Kingdom) Lieutenant (RN), (United Kingdom) Squadron Leader
1909–1919
(as monarch)
(United Kingdom) Admiral of the Fleet,
(United Kingdom) Field Marshal
(United Kingdom) Marshal of the Royal Air Force
HMS Collingwood
Royal Naval Air Service
RAF Cranwell
Independent Air Force
Britannia Royal Naval College

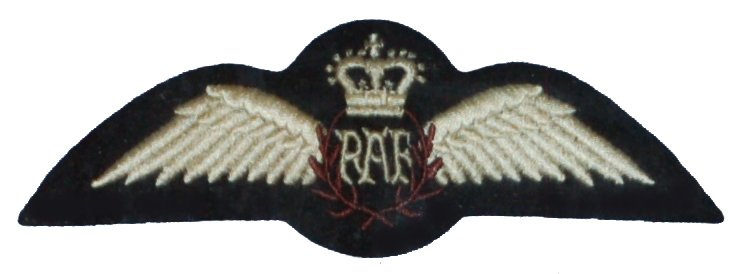

RAF pilot's flying badge/brevet (wings)

Royal Victorian Chain, 1914 Star, British War Medal, Victory Medal with Mention in Despatches, Queen Victoria Diamond Jubilee Medal, King Edward VII Coronation Medal, King George V Coronation Medal, King George V Silver Jubilee Medal, 1939-45 Star, Italy Star, France and Germany Star, Defence Medal (United Kingdom), War Medal 1939–1945, Canadian Forces' Decoration
Colonel-in-Chief – Commonwealth armies (Canadian Army, Australian Imperial Force/Australian Army Reserve, New Zealand Expeditionary Force) and Air Commodore-in-Chief of Commonwealth air forces (RCAF, RAAF, RNZAF); Field Marshal of the British Army/Admiral of the Fleet of the Royal Navy/Marshal of the Royal Air Force
Louis Mountbatten, 1st Earl Mountbatten of Burma†

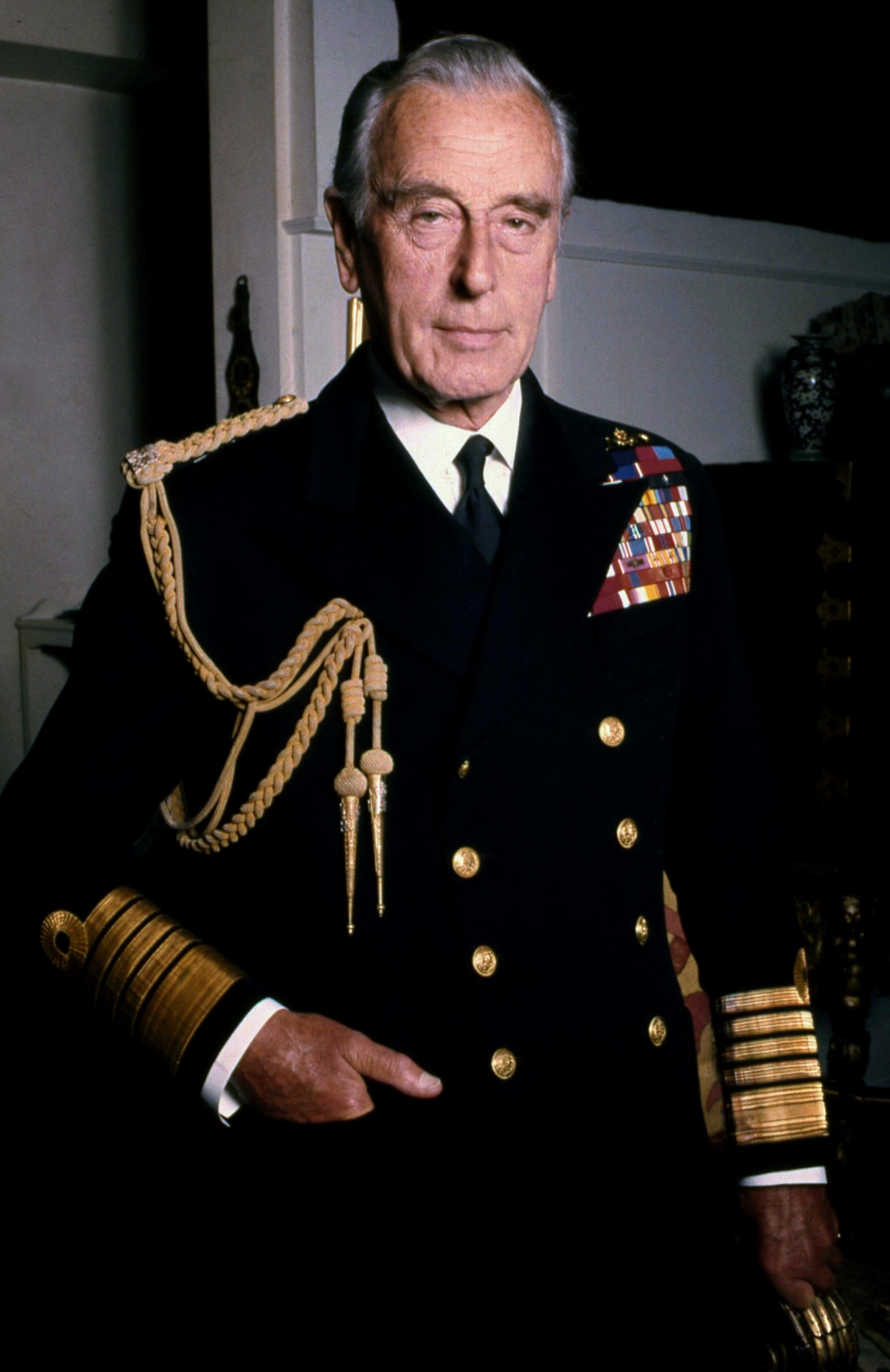
as Admiral of the Fleet of the Royal Navy (1976)

RN
(United Kingdom) Admiral of the Fleet
1913–1965

First World War, Second World War
Supreme Allied Commander South East Asia (SACSEA) 1943–1945
Royal Naval College, Dartmouth
Knight of the Garter, Knight Grand Cross of the Order of the Bath, Member of the Order of Merit, Knight Grand Commander of the Most Exalted Order of the Star of India, Knight Grand Commander of the Most Eminent Order of the Indian Empire, Knight Grand Cross of the Royal Victorian Order, Companion of the Distinguished Service Order, British War Medal, See list
Chief of the Defence Staff, First Sea Lord, Supreme Allied Commander South East Asia Command, Chief of Combined Operations, Colonel of the Life Guards, Colonel Commandant of the Royal Marines
Edward VIII of the United Kingdom†

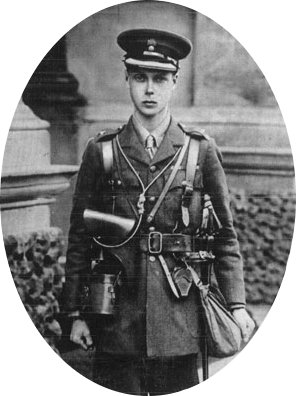
as a Second Lieutenant during the First World War

British Army, RAF
(United Kingdom) Lieutenant
1914–1918
N/A
World War I
Grenadier Guards
Osborne Naval College, Royal Naval College at Dartmouth

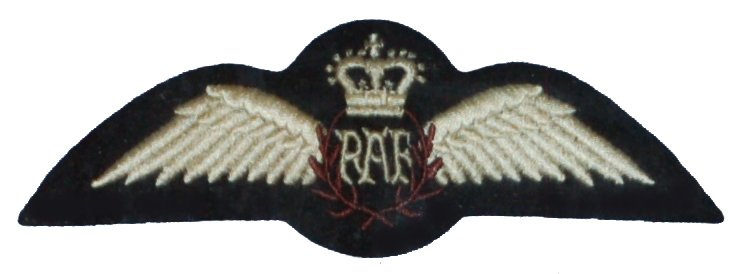

RAF pilot's flying badge/brevet (wings)

Military Cross
Colonel-in-Chief – Commonwealth armies (Canadian Army, Australian Imperial Force/Australian Army Reserve, New Zealand Expeditionary Force) and Air Commodore-in-Chief of Commonwealth air forces (Royal Canadian Air Force, RAAF, RNZAF); Field Marshal of the British Army/Admiral of the Fleet of the Royal Navy/Marshal of the Royal Air Force
Prince Henry, Duke of Gloucester†

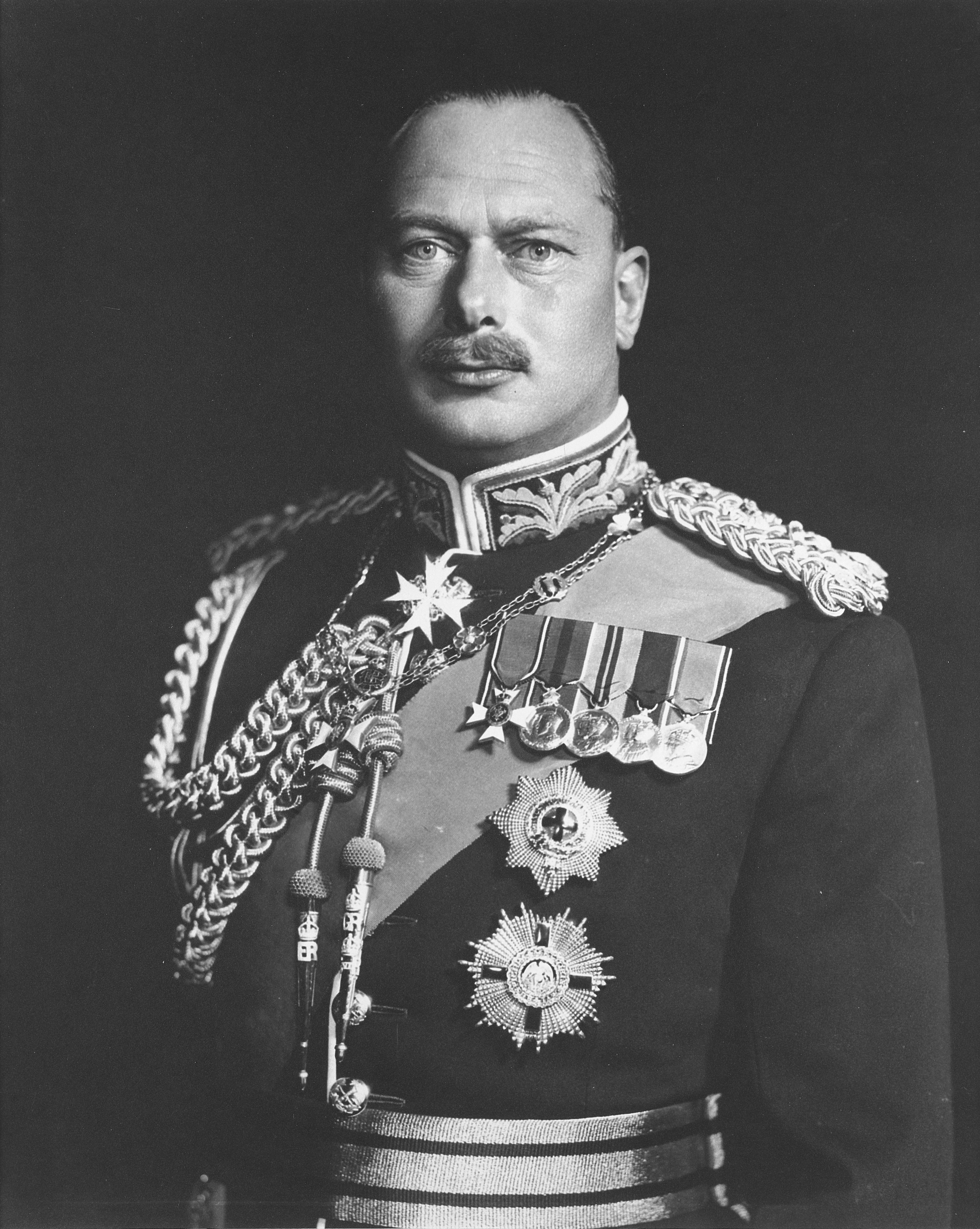
as Governor General of Australia (c. 1945)

British Army
(United Kingdom) Major (last active service rank)
1919-1937 (active service) and 1940-1945 (war service)
Honorary Captain of the RNVR, (United Kingdom) Field Marshal and Marshal of the Royal Air Force (after retiring from Army)
World War II, Battle of France
King's Royal Rifle Corps, 10th Royal Hussars, British Expeditionary Force
Royal Military College Sandhurst
None
Colonel in Chief-Gloucestershire Regiment, Colonel in Chief-Royal Inniskilling Fusiliers, Colonel-Ceylon Light Infantry, Colonel-Scots Guards, Marshal of the Royal Air Force
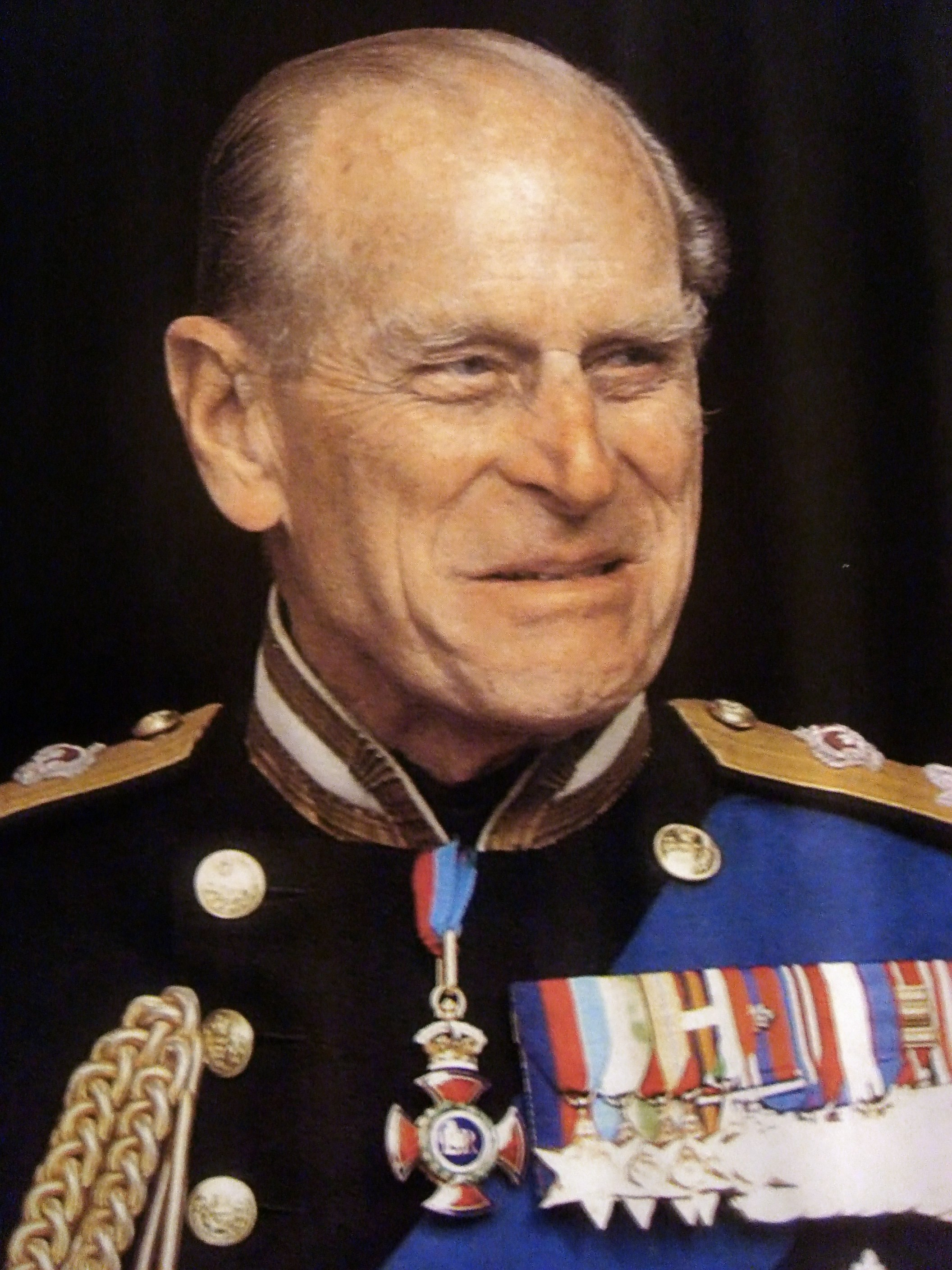
Prince Philip, Duke of Edinburgh† as Admiral of the Fleet
RN,
British Army and RAF
(United Kingdom) Commander
1940–1952
(United Kingdom) Admiral of the Fleet,
(United Kingdom) Field Marshal,
(United Kingdom) Marshal of the Royal Air Force
World War II – Allied invasion of Sicily, Battle of Crete, Battle of Cape Matapan
British Pacific Fleet
Royal Naval College, Greenwich, Britannia Royal Naval College

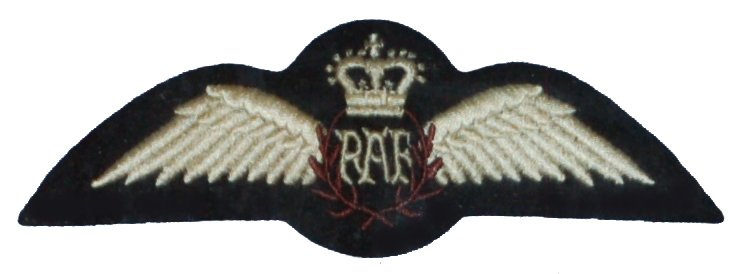

RAF pilot's flying badge/brevet (wings)

War Medal 1939-1945 with Oak Leaf,
Atlantic Star,
Africa Star,
Burma Star with Rosette,
Italy Star,
Greek War Cross,
Croix de Guerre 1939-1945 with Palm

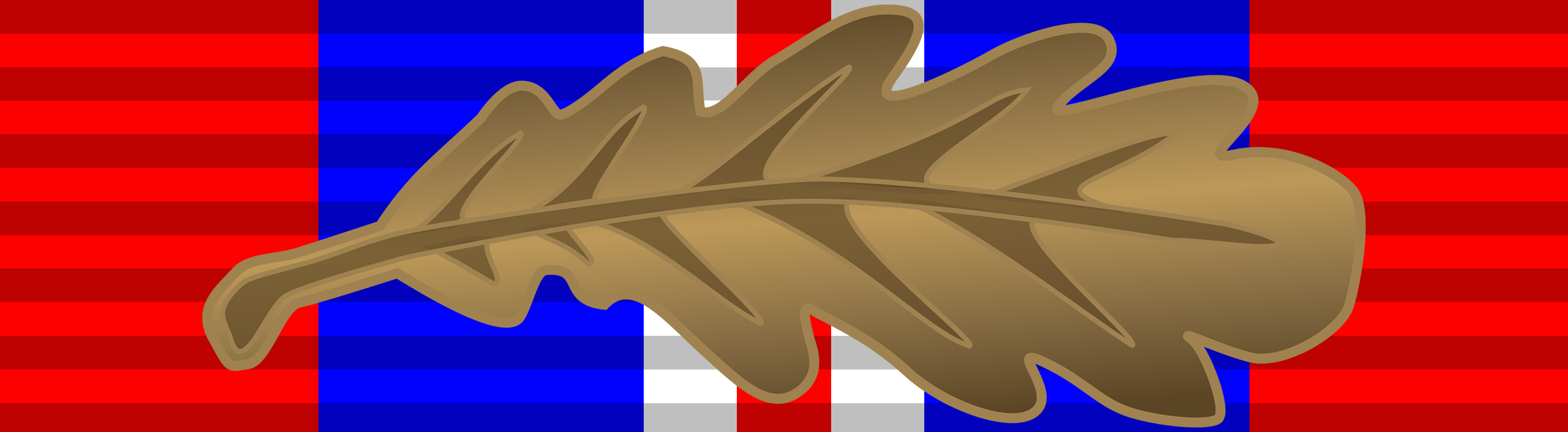

(The above are the current ribbons worn).

Lord High Admiral of the United Kingdom and Field Marshal of the United Kingdom, Australia and New Zealand, Marshal of the Royal Air Force, Marshal of the Royal Australian Air Force, Marshal of the Royal New Zealand Air Force, Colonel-in-Chief-The Royal Canadian Regiment, Colonel-in-Chief - Army Cadet Force.
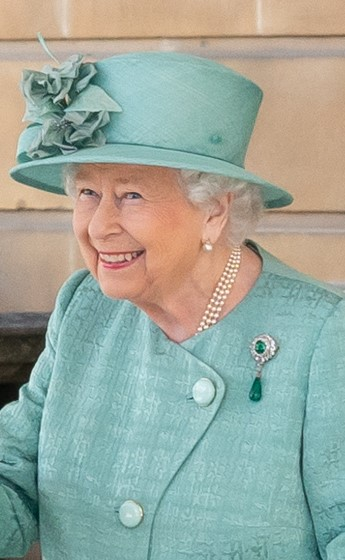
Elizabeth II of the United Kingdom†
Auxiliary Territorial Service, British Army
(United Kingdom) Subaltern (equivalent to Army Lieutenant),
(United Kingdom) Junior Commander (equivalent to Army Captain)
1945–1949

World War II ATS Service
None
None
War Medal 1939-1945 ,
Defence Medal
Ceremonial Colonel-in-Chief of Commonwealth armies and Air Commodore-in-Chief of Commonwealth air forces

Notes

1. Medals that are shown in the "Medals" column, generally only include awards that include a medal ribbon that is worn in uniform, as opposed to some decorations which may be represented by other means. Click or tap on the ribbon to see the name and details.
2. Ranks that are shown in the "Rank whilst active" column are generally the highest rank achieved by the royal. Rank achieved later (i.e. after retirement from active service and movement to reserve list) is displayed in the "Current rank worn" column.
3. Rank is received and awarded by members of the Royal Family in generally two ways:
- They receive a regular commission after undergoing officer training with one of the Armed Services at their respective establishments; (Britannia Royal Naval College, Royal Military Academy Sandhurst and Royal Air Force College Cranwell).
- They are appointed to an honorary rank, either in addition to their regular rank or instead of, if they are not actively serving officers.

N.B. Upon leaving active service, royal members are generally promoted to the rank they would have received, if they had stayed in the Armed Services.

== Ranks and roles held by members of the royal family with no military service (honorary ranks) ==
These members of the royal family hold various honorary ranks within the British Armed Forces although having not served in the military before. Listed below are only those of the British military, but there are many more held throughout the Commonwealth.

These may include:

- Royal Colonel - an appointment made by the Monarch, to appointment of Colonel-in-Chief or Colonel of a regiment
- Honorary Air Commodore-in-Chief and Honorary Air Commodores for the Royal Air Force
- Honorary Commodore-in-Chief for the Royal Navy.

Photograph of Royal
Name of royal
Rank
Naval Roles
Army Roles
Air Force Roles
Uniform
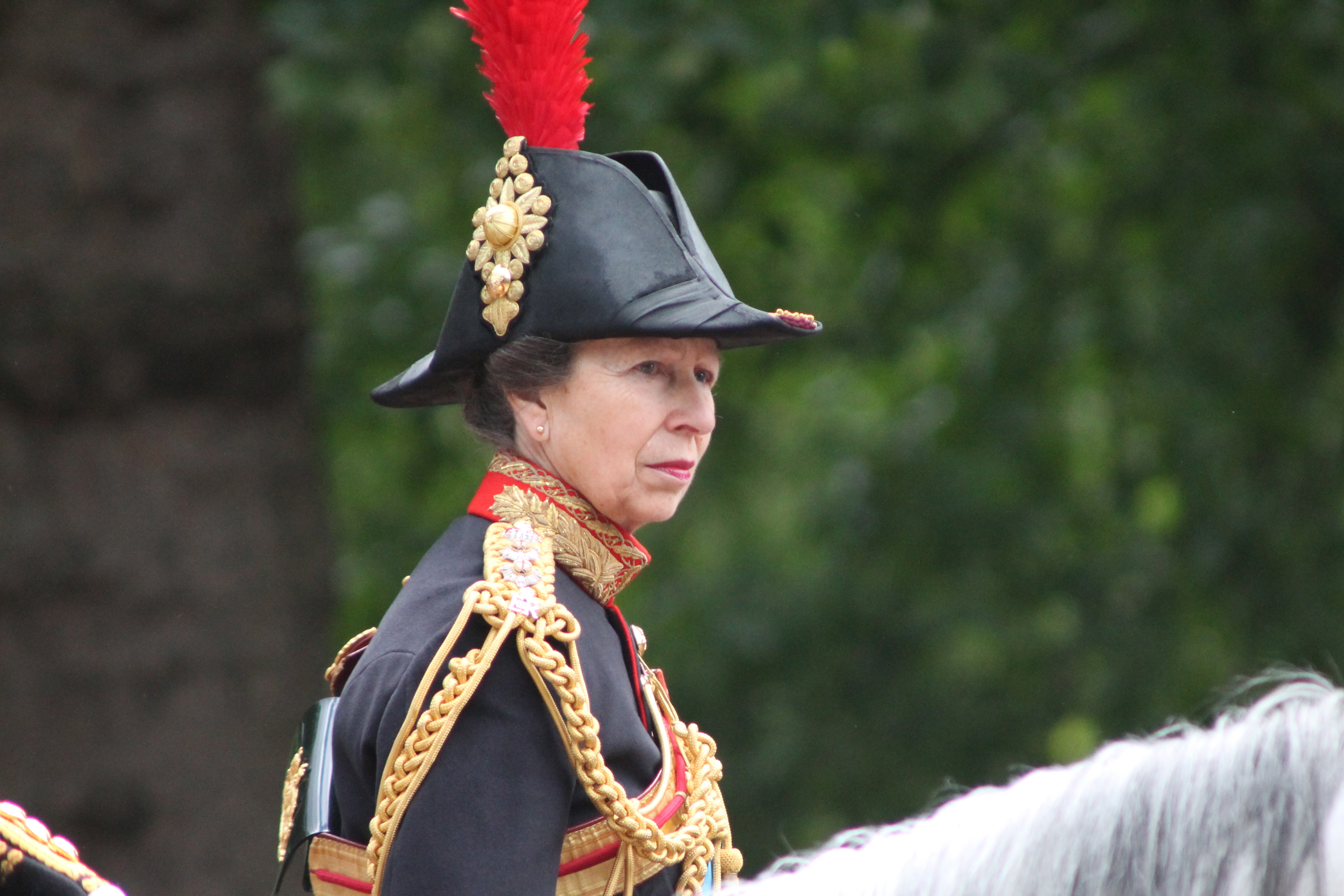

In Household Cavalry uniform, as Colonel of Blues and Royals

Anne, Princess Royal
Admiral (2012), General, Air Chief Marshal
Chief Commandant for Women in the Royal Navy, Commodore-in-Chief of HMNB Portsmouth,

Admiral of the SCC

Colonel-in-Chief of the following:
- 2nd Btn, Mercian Regt,
- Royal Corps of Signals,
- KRH,
- RLC,
- RAVC,
- the Royal Scots Borderers, 1st Battalion & 52nd Lowland, 6th Battalion, Royal Regiment of Scotland,
- Intelligence Corps

Affiliated Colonel-in-Chief of:

- the Queen's Gurkha Signals,
- Queen's Own Gurkha Logistic Regiment,

Colonel of the Blues and Royals, Royal Honorary Colonel of the University of London OTC, Commandant-in-Chief of the FANY,

Honorary Air Commodore of:
- the University of London Air Squadron,
- RAF Brize Norton,
Uniform for all three services, the uniform worn is dependent upon the occasion (e.g. parade visit, working visit (e.g. to a ship), evening dinner, etc.) Plus any medals, qualification or trade badge may also be worn.
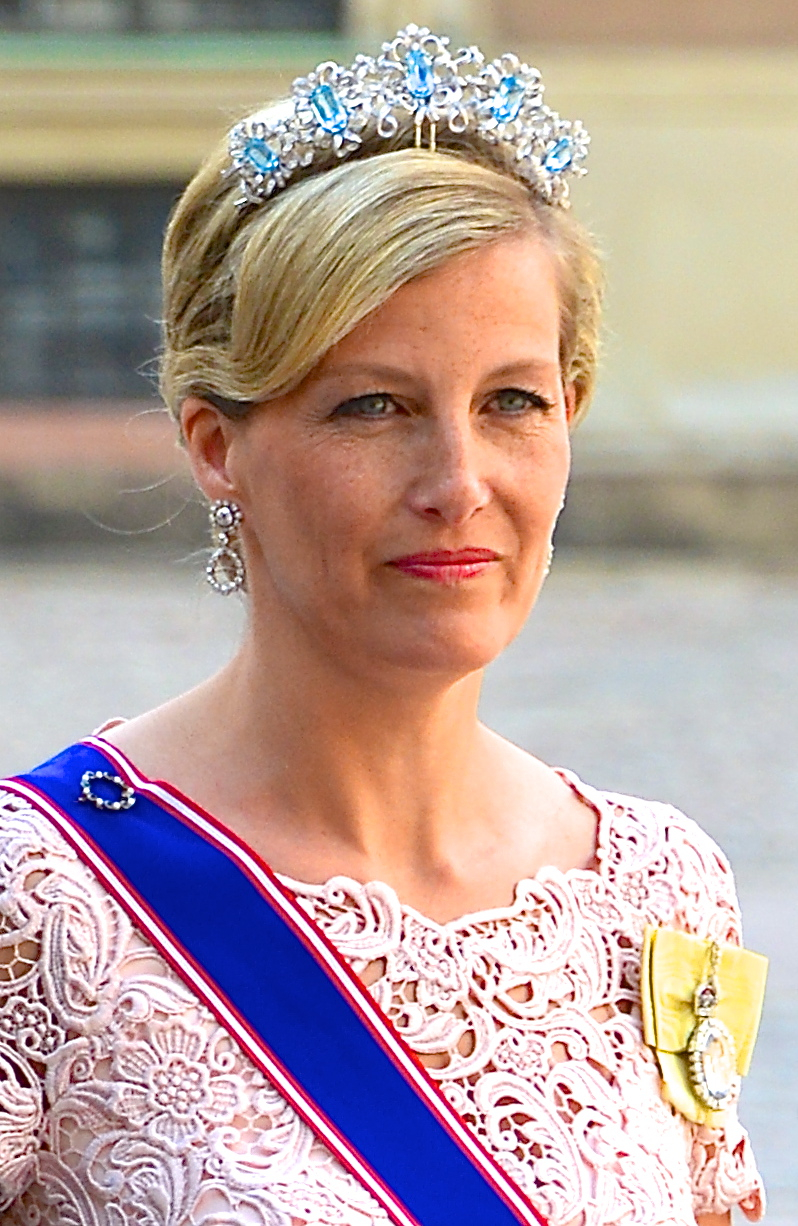
Sophie, Duchess of Edinburgh
None in own right, rank worn on occasion when acting in capacity as honorary rank (see right)
None
Colonel-in-Chief of the QARANC, RCAM/CAMUS, REME,

Royal Colonel of 5th Battalion, The Rifles

Honorary Air Commodore, RAF Wittering

== Military service of English monarchs ==
A few English monarchs came to the throne from other countries and served in the armies of their home country. A few served in other armies during their exile.

Service information
Name of royal	Service	Wartime service
George I of Great Britain	Army of the Dutch Republic	Franco-Dutch War
William III of England	Army of the Dutch Republic	Glorious Revolution
James II of England	Imperial French and Spanish Empire armies; he later served as Lord High Admiral of the Royal Navy	1652–1656
Charles II of England	English Army – Commander of West Country 1640s and the Engagers	English Civil War
Charles I of England	English Army	English Civil War
Henry V of England	English Army	Hundred Years' War
William II of England	English Army
William I of England	Army of the Normans	Norman invasion of England

== See also ==
- British royal family
- The Canadian Crown and the Canadian Armed Forces
- British Armed Forces
- United Kingdom
