= Henry Ardern Lewis =

English minister and bard (1879–1957)

Henry Ardern Lewis (September 1879 – 28 March 1957) was a Church of England minister and Cornish Bard. He was known for several publications during the 1930s dealing with the legends of Joseph of Arimathea and Glastonbury Abbey.

== Early life ==
Henry Ardern Lewis was born in September 1879 at Worcester His father, Henry Ardern Lewis, M.A., (Snr.) was Vicar of St Nicholas Parish Church, Trelleck, Monmouthshire. Lewis was educated at the King's School, Worcester, an independent boarding school founded by Henry VIII in 1541. After passing the public examinations known as Moderations, he studied at Hertford College, Oxford, graduating with a third-class degree in the Greats on 2 August 1902. After graduation Lewis enrolled as a student at the Leeds Clergy School, Yorkshire, a residential theological college of the Church of England established in 1876.

== Career ==
After graduating from the Leeds Clergy School, Lewis was ordained as a deacon at St Asaph's Cathedral Church on Saturday 26 September 1903. A year later on Wednesday 21 September 1904, in accordance with Anglican practice, Lewis was ordained a priest at Bangor Cathedral. Under the sponsorship of the Dean of Oxford University, Lewis was awarded his Master of Arts degree on 25 May 1905.

=== South Africa ===
In 1905 Lewis was appointed as an assistant chaplain to the South African Church Railway Mission (SACRM), a philanthropic and religious organisation focusing on the moral and spiritual well-being of railway workers and their families.

=== Tewkesbury, England ===
Lewis returned to England in August 1908 taking up the position of curate at the Tewkesbury Abbey Church of St Mary the Virgin, Gloucestershire. The following month, on 22 September, Lewis married Dorothy Lewis (née Lewis), only child of the Rev. George Lewis, rector of Icomb, near Stow-on-the-Wold.

=== Canada ===
In October 1910 Lewis was appointed missionary priest to the diocese of Fort Qu'Appelle, Saskatchewan province, Canada. The diocese of Qu'Appelle was established in 1884 to serve a network of commercial trails leading across the Canadian prairies.

=== World War I ===
On 19 May 1915, Lewis entered service as a temporary chaplain Royal Navy (T.C.R.N.) aboard HMS Sutlej, a 12,000-ton Cressy-class armoured cruiser built around 1899. As part of the 9th Cruiser Squadron, Sutlej's main duties were escorting convoy ships from the South Atlantic seaboard of West Africa. In addition to divine service, Lewis provided emotional and spiritual support for the 250 Church of England sailors aboard ship. On 24 March 1917, Lewis was transferred to HMS Bacchante, flagship of the 9th Cruiser Squadron, where he remained until June 1919.

=== Sierra Leone ===
After his discharge from the Navy, Lewis went to Sierra Leone as chaplain to Bishop John Walmsley. The two men had first met aboard HMS Bacchante, when the bishop took Divine Service and confirmations. In a written tribute to Walmsley after the bishop's death on 9 December 1922, Lewis described him as 'our Bishop and our best friend.'

=== Oxford, England ===
Lewis returned to England in 1920, taking up the position of organising secretary for the Society for the Propagation of the Gospel in Foreign Parts, in the diocese of Oxford. The S.P.G. was founded by royal charter in London by the Rev. Dr. Thomas Bray in 1701. The aim of the society was to promote the Gospel message in colonies of North America, but quickly expanded its operations to include Canada, New Zealand, Australia and West Africa. Bishop Walmsley occasionally visited 'when he was up in Oxford for a gaudy at his old college.' Sometimes he would stay with them at their 'little Cornish cottage on the moors.'

=== Lagos, Nigeria ===
In December 1922, Lewis was appointed colonial chaplain at Lagos, Nigeria. Three years into his service at Lagos, Lewis approached the wealthy industrialist and philanthropist, Lord William Leverhulme, for a donation towards Church funds. In the early 1900s, Lever was using palm oil for its Sunlight Soap products, produced in the British West African colonies. The letter from Lord Leverhulme's secretary, dated 27 January 1925, expressed his regret that he was unable to donate funds to the Church.

== Cornwall ==
=== St Cleer ===
In 1929 Lewis returned to England to take up the position of vicar of the parish church of St Cleer. It was here that he met the archaeologist Charles Kenneth Croft Andrew, a founder member of the Looe Old Cornwall Society in 1927. Due to their mutual interest in antiquarian subjects, the two men struck up a close personal friendship.

=== Talland Church ===
In 1933 Lewis took up the residence at Talland Church. In a letter to W.H. Paynter, recorder of the Looe O.C.S., Croft Andrew states that: 'When he [Lewis] took up the living at Talland, I told him the story of the legend of Lammana, which he afterwards developed into his booklets The Child Christ . . . Ab Antiquo &c.' The Medieval Priory of St Michael of Lammana was owned by the Benedictine monks of Glastonbury Abbey, from c. 1144 to 1290. A local legend of unknown antiquity stated that 'in ancient times, Joseph of Arimathea, the rich mam of the Gospels, was a tin merchant who used to visit Britain in order to purchase tin. On one such visit, he brought his young nephew with him. Whilst Joseph went ashore to the mainland to trade with the Cornish tinners, the boy Jesus played on the beach of Looe Island until his uncles return.'

=== Looe Old Cornwall Society ===
On Saturday 20 January 1934, Lewis gave a talk on the legend of Lammana at the monthly meeting of the Looe Old Cornwall Society. The talk was printed in The Cornish Times on Friday 26 January 1934, as Did Christ Visit Cornwall?, and printed as a booklet the same year entitled The Child Christ at Lammana, distributed by W.H. Smith & Son.

== Archaeology ==
Lewis was involved in two campaigns of excavations at Lammana in October 1935 and September 1936. The three day excavation in 1935 was personally financed by Lewis, C.B. Willcocks, F.R.I.B.A, F.S.A., and Croft Andrew, and confirmed the exact location of the mainland chapel of the Priory of Lammana. Excavations carried out the following year in 1936 were conducted over three weeks, and recovered a wide range of pottery finds, including Samian ware, ridge tiles and roof slates, wall plaster, animal bones and human remains.

=== Ab Antiquo ===
Eighteen months after the publication of The Child Christ at Lammana, Lewis published Ab Antiquo, subtitled 'The Story of Lammana (Looe Island),' dedicated to Prior Helyas, the first documented incumbent of the priory in c. 1200, 'and All His Predecessors.' Using a wide range of historical documents, from Episcopal Registers, Close and Pipe Rolls, Deeds, Feudal Aids, and Charters, Lewis traced the medieval history of Lammana from the mid-12th century to the Dissolution of the Monasteries. The title was taken from the charter of Hasculf de Soleigny, c. 1200, in which he gives the island of St Michael of Lammana and all its lands 'as a gift of my predecessors ab antiquo (from ancient times) to the Church of St Mary of Glastonbury.'

=== Diocese of Truro ===
In December 1943, Lewis was given permission to officiate in the diocese of Truro. By the beginning of 1944, he had taken up the residence of the Parsonage, St Martin's Church on the Isles of Scilly. During this period, Lewis began a series of archaeological investigations at Knackyboy and Yellow Rock Cairn, at Middle Town, St Martin's, publishing a booklet in 1945 entitled St Martin's, St Helen's and Tean (Iseles of Scilly) in legend and history, and an article in the Antiquities Journal, volume 29, 1949.

== Final years ==
=== Cornish Bard ===
On Saturday, 4 September 1948, at the Gorsedh Kernow held at Carwynnen Quoit, near Camborne, Lewis was made a Cornish Bard for his services to archaeology at St Martin's. His bardic name was Dyskybel Malgan, 'Disciple of Maelgwin,' after a 6th-century King of Gwynedd.

=== Retirement ===
Following the death of Dorothy in October 1951, Lewis returned to the mainland and retired to No. 4, Regent Terrace, Penzance. On 28 March 1957, after suffering from a bronchial illness, Lewis died aged 77, at the West Cornwall Hospital. He is buried at Paul Parish Church, Penzance.

== Biographical sources ==
Crockford's Clerical Directory, 1957–58, p. 703

College register, 1875–1927, ref. 28/1/1, and Register of Degrees awarded 1876–1971, ref. 28/9/1a; courtesy of Hertford College, Oxford University

Stow Deanery Magazine, issues July 1904; August and September 1908

Tewkesbury Parochial Magazine, September 1910, No. 381

Bushley & Longdon Almanack and Yearbook, 1910

E.G. Walmsley, John Walmsley, Ninth Bishop of Sierra Leone, A Memoir for His Friends, Society for Promoting Christian Knowledge, London, 1923

Recorder Notebook 1933-36, Looe Old Cornwall Society

Personal correspondence: Charles Kenneth Croft Andrew, 1934, 1972; J. Lightowler, Aug-Sept 1934, Lammana Archive, Looe Old Cornwall Society

Ann Trevenen Jenkin, Gorsedh Kernow returns to Carwynnen, 1948-2015, Gorsedh Kernow, 2015
