= Lammana Priory =

Priory in Looe, Cornwall, England

Coordinates: 50°20′13″N 4°26′57″W

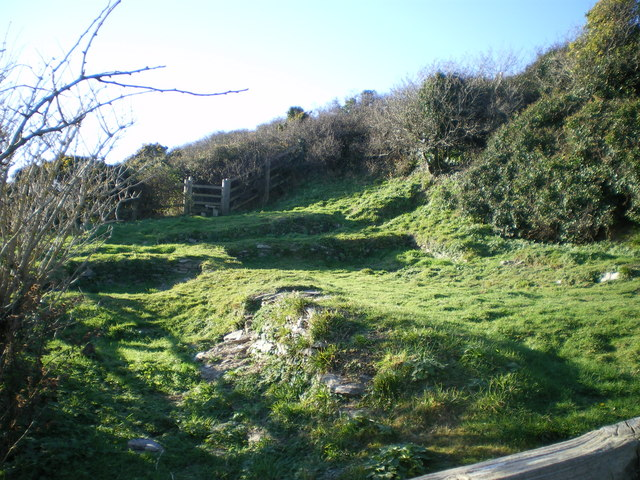
Ruins of St Michael's chapel, Lammana (on the mainland)

Lammana Priory was a priory on Looe Island in Cornwall, UK, consisting of two Benedictine monks until 1289. It was owned by Glastonbury Abbey and the property was sold in 1289 to a local landowner.

== History ==
The Priory of St Michael of Lammana was a possession of the Benedictine monastery of Glastonbury Abbey during the Middle Ages. It consisted of two chapels; one on the top of Looe Island, and another chapel directly opposite on the mainland. A third building known as the Monk's House, located 150 yards down the hill from the mainland chapel, was the monks living quarters. It also had a refectory for pilgrims who came to visit the island for Michaelmas.

The earliest documentary evidence for the existence of the priory is a papal confirmation of Pope Lucius II in 1144. The confirmation (Privilegium) was made during the abbacy of Bishop Henry of Blois, the brother of King Stephen.

Some sixty years later, (c. 1200) we have the charter of Hasculf de Soleigny, the lord of the manor of Portlooe, granting to the Church of the Blessed Virgin Mary of Glastonbury ... the Island of St Michael of Lammana, with all its appurtenances, lands, and tithes which they have held ab antiquo, 'from of old.'

Although not strictly a parish, it consisted of approximately 297 acres of tithe lands which ran from the edge of St Nicholas Church in West Looe, up West Looe Hill as far as the junction of Talland Road and then southwards to the manor of Portlooe, and downstream to a field known as Old Mills.

The ownership of tithes were the matter of a long-standing dispute with the Augustinian canons of Launceston Priory, who acquired the parish of Talland early in the 13th century.

In about 1240–50, Earl Richard of Cornwall granted permission for Glastonbury to lease out the manor of Lammana, and on the 24 June 1289, the patronage of the island chapel was sold to Walter of Treverbyn, lord of Portlooe.

The dispute over ownership once again returned, and Walter was forced to sue Launceston Priory for damages amounting to £40. In October 1290, the Sheriff of Cornwall was instructed to form a jury of twelve local men, who returned a verdict at the Court of Common Pleas, Westminster, in favour of Walter.

The chapels remained in use up until the Dissolution of the Monasteries in the reign of Henry VIII in mid-sixteenth century. Eventually they fell into disrepair, and by the mid-nineteenth century, apart from a few visible walls, became ruins.

== Archaeology ==
The mainland chapel was excavated in 1935 and 1936, by Charles Kenneth Croft Andrew, antiquarian and archaeologist, with the support of his friend the Rev. Henry Ardern Lewis, M.A., then Vicar of Talland, and Mr C.B. Willcocks, F.R.I.B.A., F.S.A.

Croft Andrew's excavations were re-evaluated in 1994 by Dr Lynette Olson, senior lecturer of History at Sydney University, along with Cathy O'Mahoney, Ann Preston-Jones and Peter Rose.

In 2008 Channel 4's archaeology series Time Team carried out excavations on Looe Island and the mainland. Wessex Archaeology were commissioned to record finds and evaluate the archaeological context.

Post archaeological assessment

Looe Island

The evaluation concluded that there was 'no definitive evidence for prehistoric activity on either site.' A large stone buried in the grounds of Island House may have been prehistoric, but the absence of a socket indicated that it had been removed from another location on the island. Romano-British (AD 43-410) pottery was found in two ditches, and a small hoard of eight Roman coins dating between AD 253–330. The latest of these coins was a 'camp gate' issue of the House of Constantine the Great (d. 337). There was a single phase of construction of the chapel with the addition of a buttress to the south west corner of the nave in the 13th century. An inhumation burial was found underneath the area of the chancel arch, with a second burial outside the southern wall of the chapel. Neither burials could be securely dated. Pottery in the upper fill of the chancel burial was dated as 15th or 16th century.

Mainland Chapel

Wessex Archaeology confirmed the 1930s ground plan consisting of a nave and chancel with a south facing porch, and a second entrance to the north of the building. There was evidence of a rood screen in front of the chancel arch. The rood screen separated the nave from the chancel. Access to the chancel was restricted to the priest or chaplain in charge, for marriages, and for lords of the manor who usually held the advowson. One inhumation burial in situ was found in the south east corner of the chancel. A stone lined reliquary was found in the central area of the chancel. Reliquaries contained items deemed too precious to display inside the church, such as holy relics, or the bones of the saint who founded the site. A radio carbon date of a humerus taken from the inhumation burial produced a date range of AD 1200–1280. The skeleton was that of an adult male aged between 35 and 55, with an approximate height of 5 feet 4 inches tall. Wessex Archaeology concluded that the foundation date of the mainland chapel remains unknown.
