= Colonel (United Kingdom) =

Military rank of the United Kingdom

- Army No. 2 and Royal Marines No. 1B service uniform insignia
- Country: United Kingdom
- Service branch: British Army; Royal Marines
- Abbreviation: Col
- Rank group: Field officers
- NATO rank code: OF-5
- Formation: Mid-16th century
- Next higher rank: Brigadier
- Next lower rank: Lieutenant colonel
- Equivalent ranks: Captain (RN); Group captain (RAF)

Colonel (Col) is a rank of the British Army and Royal Marines, ranking below brigadier, and above lieutenant colonel. British colonels are not usually field commanders; typically they serve as staff officers between field commands at battalion and brigade level. The insignia is two diamond-shaped pips (properly called "Bath Stars") below a crown. The crown has varied in the past with different monarchs; Elizabeth II's reign used St Edward's Crown. The rank is equivalent to captain in the Royal Navy and group captain in the Royal Air Force.

== Etymology ==
The rank of colonel was popularised by the tercios that were employed in the Spanish Army during the 16th and 17th centuries. General Gonzalo Fernández de Córdoba divided his troops into coronelías (meaning "column of soldiers" from the Latin, columnella or "small column"). These units were led by a coronel. This command structure and its titles were soon adopted as colonello in early modern Italian and in Middle French as coronel.

The rank title entered the English language from French in the mid-16th century and so the modern English pronunciation of the word is derived from the French variant.

== History ==
The use of the rank of colonel pre-dates the establishment of the United Kingdom. In the mid-17th century, the regiments of the New Model Army were commanded by colonels.

The British Army has historically been organized around the regiment, with each regiment being raised, uniformed, and equipped either directly by the crown or by a nobleman. The colonels nominally commanding these regiments (usually the noblemen who raised them) often had little to do with the regiment's actual activities, either because they contemporaneously served as general officers or because they were essentially mere financiers. The day to day command of the regiment was left to a lieutenant colonel or major.

By the end of the 17th century in Great Britain, the "colonel of a regiment" was often a titled person who had been given royal permission to raise it for service and command it in battle. As such, he was required to cover all costs of the regiment's equipment, uniforms and wages as well as select its officers. Until the late 18th century most British regiments were commonly known by the name of the colonelcy, for example Lord Churchill's Dragoons (1683–1685) or Elliot's Light Horse (1759–66).

By the start of the American Revolutionary War most English and Welsh regiments in the standing army of Great Britain were named numerically, although some independent Highland regiments—such as MacLeod's Highlanders—were raised in the name of their colonel for service in West Africa and India. The change from a colonelcy based on patronage was because the British Army's administration had been reformed into three administrative bodies:

- The War Office was that responsible for day-to-day administration of the army, and for the cavalry and infantry;
- The Board of Ordnance was responsible for the supply of weapons and ammunition, and administered the Royal Artillery and Royal Engineers;
- The Commissariat was responsible for the supply of rations and transport. It occasionally raised its own fighting units, such as "battoemen" (armed watermen and pioneers in North America).

The reforms meant that the British government was now financially responsible for the pay, clothing and equipment of the troops in the service of the British Crown. Colonels were also no longer permitted to profit directly from the sale of officer commissions in their regiments. A lieutenant-colonel commanded the regiment in battle.

By the beginning of the Napoleonic Wars, the title "colonel of the regiment" had become a sinecure appointment for distinguished generals and members of the royal family or British nobility. Despite an individual only being permitted to hold one colonelcy, it was a profitable position as they were in financial charge of their regiment's allowance from the government. This meant they could hope to make a profit on the funds allocated for equipment, supplies and uniforms. As generals were mostly on half-pay, a colonelcy was a method of providing them with extra income. Many colonels spent large sums of their own money on their regiments.

By the end of the 19th century, the reorganisation of the British Army through the Cardwell and Childers Reforms had established a colonel as a professional rank with senior administrative responsibilities in regiment or brigade.

== Ceremonial usage ==
=== Colonel-in-chief ===
Another title employed by the British Army is "colonel-in-chief" which is distinct from the ceremonial title "Colonel of the Regiment".

The position is usually held by a member of the royal family who acts as a patron to the unit, as Princess Margaret, Countess of Snowdon, did for the Bermuda Regiment. Although they do not have an operational role, they are kept informed of all important activities undertaken by the regiment and pay occasional visits to its operational units.

The chief purpose of a colonel-in-chief is to maintain a direct link between a given regiment and the royal family.

=== Colonel of the regiment ===
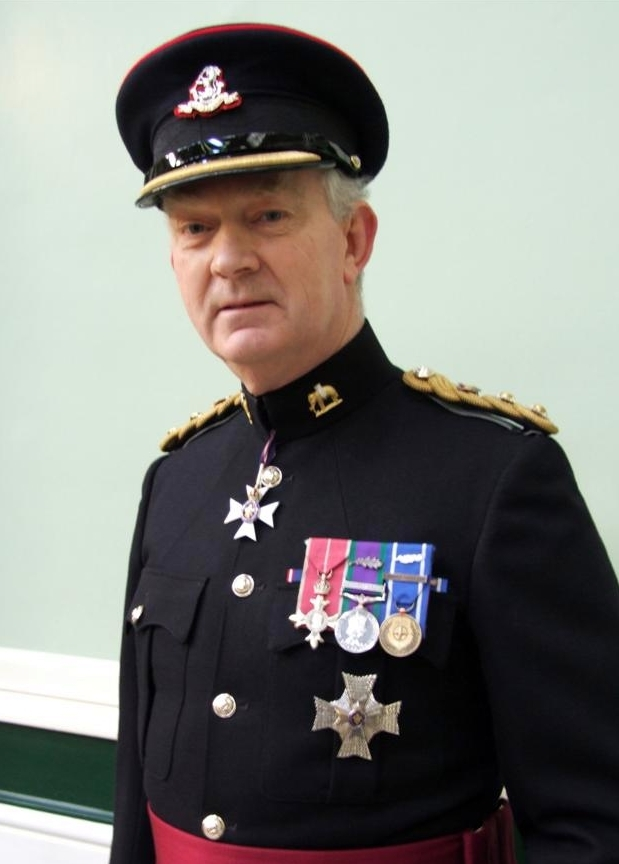
Major General Sir Evelyn Webb-Carter as the last Colonel of the Regiment of the Duke of Wellington's Regiment

Some of the historic duties associated with the title colonel of the regiment (to distinguish it from the military rank of colonel) continue to be used in the modern British Army. The ceremonial position is often conferred on retired general officers, brigadiers or colonels who have a close link to a particular regiment. Non-military personnel, usually for positions within the Army Reserve, may also be appointed to the ceremonial position. When attending functions as "colonel of the regiment", the titleholder wears the regimental uniform with rank insignia of (full) colonel, regardless of their official rank. A member of the royal family is known as a royal colonel. A colonel of the regiment is expected to work closely with a regiment and its regimental association.

=== Honorary colonel ===
Regiments or units may have an honorary colonel, which is solely a ceremonial rank, that can also be held by a civilian, with no military service. If the appointment is held by a member of the royal family it is known as royal honorary colonel. Certain units may have one or more deputy colonels.

=== Colonel of Marines ===
The Royal Navy once conveyed the honorific title "Colonel of Marines" to post-captains as a reward for highly distinguished service. It was a salaried sinecure position with no additional obligations outside a captain's normal naval duties. He would lose this title and its additional pay upon reaching flag rank. Horatio Nelson was given such a colonelcy in 1795, two years before he reached flag rank.

== Royal Air Force ==
From 1 April 1918 to 31 July 1919, the Royal Air Force maintained the rank of colonel. During this period, groups were often commanded by RAF colonels. The rank of colonel was superseded by that of group captain on 1 August 1919.

== Historical insignia ==
When badges of rank were introduced for field officers in 1810, full colonels were designated with a crown and star worn on shoulder epaulettes. In 1855, after the Crimean War, new dress regulations were published which specified changes where rank would be worn. Thereafter full colonels wore half-inch regimental pattern laces on upper and lower collar, with one crown and one star. In 1880 the insignia was moved to the shoulder boards when in full dress, and full colonels were given an extra star. The pattern of a crown above two stars has remained the identifying insignia from 1880 to the present day although it has variously been worn on the shoulder, cuff and chest.

1810 to 1855 colonel's shoulder rank insignia

1856 to 1867 colonel's collar rank insignia

1867 to 1880 colonel's collar rank insignia

1881 to 1902 colonel's shoulder rank insignia

During World War I, colonels wore the following cuff badges:

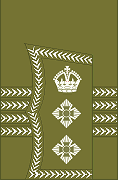
World War I colonel's rank insignia (general pattern)

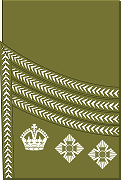
World War I colonel's rank insignia (Scottish pattern)

== Current insignia ==
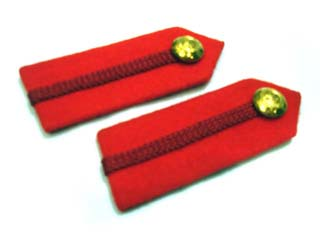
A colonel's gorget patches

The insignia is two diamond-shaped pips (properly called "Bath Stars") below a crown. Gorget patches, colloquially known as red tabs, with crimson lace and a brass button are also worn by officers of the substantive rank of colonel as part of their general staff uniform. Gorget patches are not worn by regimental colonels, who wear the regimental uniform.

== See also ==
- British and U.S. military ranks compared
- British Army Other Ranks rank insignia
- British Army officer rank insignia
- Colonel (title)
- Colonel-in-chief

== Bibliography ==
- Mallinson, Allan (2009). The Making of the British Army. Bantam Press. ISBN 978-0-593-05108-5.
