= Sutlej (disambiguation) =

The Sutlej is a river in northern India and Pakistan.

Sutlej may refer to the following subjects:

== Geography ==
- Satluj Valley in the Kinnaur district of Himachal Pradesh, India through which the Sutlej river runs
- The Shek Sheung River in Hong Kong's New Territories is also known as the Sutlej River
- The Sutlej Channel, a waterway in British Columbia, Canada
- The Sutlej Yamuna link canal, a proposed freight canal connecting the Sutlej and Yamuna rivers

== History ==
- The Cis-Sutlej states, a British protectorate established in 1809, and merged in to the Punjab Province of British India in 1862
- The First Anglo-Sikh War, which occurred during 1845 and 1846, is sometimes referred to as the Sutlej Campaign
  - The Sutlej Medal, awarded to British soldiers involved in the war

== Arts, entertainment, and media ==
- Satluj, a 2026 Indian biographical drama film

== People ==
- Hugh Sutlej Gough, a British military officer born in 1849 and died in 1920

== Ships ==
- HMS Sutlej (1855), a sail frigate of the Royal Navy launched in 1855 and broken up in 1869
- HMS Sutlej (1899), an armoured cruiser of the Royal Navy launched in 1899 and scrapped in 1924
- HMIS Sutlej (U95), a sloop of the Royal Indian Navy (and later, the Indian Navy) launched in 1940 and sold for scrap in 1979
- MV Sutlej, a freighter built in 1940 and torpedoed in 1944
- SS Sutlej, a freighter built in 1907 and used to transport indentured Indian labourers to British colonies
