= HMS Bacchante =

Six ships of the Royal Navy have been named HMS Bacchante, from "Bacchante" – the name for a priestess of the Roman god Bacchus. Yet another ship of this name was ordered but later cancelled. (The ancient Bacchante were also known as Maenads, and there had also been a HMS Maenad (J335).)

- HMS Bacchante – 20-gun French corvette launched in 1795 and captured by HMS Endymion in 1803. Sold in 1809.
- HMS Bacchante (1811) – 38-gun fifth rate launched in 1811 at Deptford. She was converted to harbour service in 1837 and scrapped in 1858.
- HMS Bacchante – a wood screw frigate ordered from Portsmouth Dockyard in 1849 but cancelled in 1851.
- HMS Bacchante (1859) – a wood screw frigate launched in 1859 at Portsmouth Dockyard. She was broken up in 1869.
- HMS Bacchante (1876) – Bacchante-class corvette launched 19 October 1876, sold 1897
- HMS Bacchante (1901) – Cressy-class armoured cruiser launched in 1901 and sold for scrap in 1920.
- HMS Bacchante (shore establishment) - Aberdeen, Scotland during First and Second World Wars
- HMS Bacchante (F69) – Leander-class frigate launched in 1968 and sold to New Zealand in 1982.

== Battle honours ==
Ships named Bacchante have earned the following battle honours:

- Cattaro 1814
- Heligoland 1914
- Dardanelles 1915–16
