= Sutlej Channel =

Strait in the Central Coast region of British Columbia, Canada

Coordinates: 50°53′00″N 126°44′00″W

Sutlej Channel is a channel or strait on the north sides of Broughton Island and North Broughton Island, or the Broughton Archipelago of the Queen Charlotte Strait region of the Central Coast of British Columbia, Canada. The channel separates those islands from the adjacent mainland and includes Greenway Sound. It was named for HMS Sutlej.
