= Royal colonel =

Commonwealth military appointment

Royal Colonel is an appointment made by the British monarch, currently King Charles III, to members of the British royal family who are appointed to the position of Colonel-in-Chief or Colonel of a regiment within the British or Commonwealth army. Royal Colonel appointments are made for regiments and military units of the British Army. Similar roles exist in honorary Air Commodores-in-Chief and Air Commodores for the Royal Air Force, and honorary Commodore-in-Chief for the Royal Navy.

These appointments are honorary and allow the holder to wear the regimental uniform with rank insignia of (full) colonel, regardless of their official rank. They are a ceremonial appointment designed to further strengthen the bond between the British Army and the Royal Family.

The appointment of Royal Colonels is made by the Sovereign and is announced in a press release issued by Buckingham Palace.
