= Carwynnen =

Coordinates: 50.185°N 5.293°W

- Location within Cornwall
- OS grid reference: SW650369
- Civil parish: Camborne
- Unitary authority: Cornwall
- Ceremonial county: Cornwall
- Region: South West
- Country: England
- Sovereign state: United Kingdom
- Post town: CAMBORNE
- Postcode district: TR14
- Dialling code: 01209
- Police: Devon and Cornwall
- Fire: Cornwall
- Ambulance: South Western
- UK Parliament: Camborne and Redruth

Carwynnen is a hamlet in Cornwall, United Kingdom. It is located between the villages of Troon and Praze-an-Beeble, and is situated 2 miles (3.2 km) south of Camborne (where the 2011 census population was listed). Carwynnen consists of only 7 dwellings.

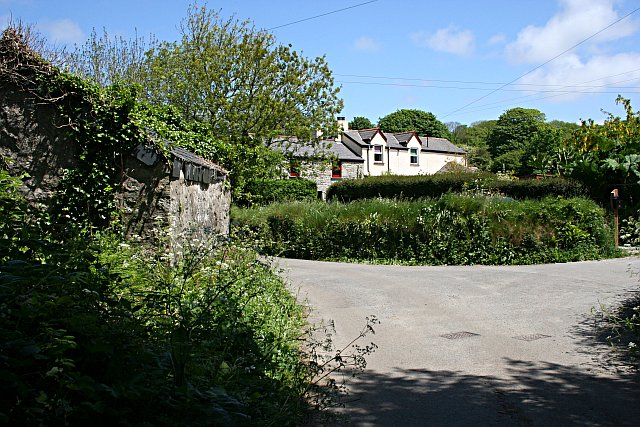
Carwynnen

Carwynnen was part of the Pendarves Estate which lay between Troon and the Camborne parish boundary with Crowan, at the River Connor that runs through Carwynnen. Nearby is Carwynnen Quoit.
