= Greenway Sound =

Coordinates: 50°51′00″N 126°46′00″W

Greenway Sound is a sound in the area of the Broughton Archipelago, which lies on the north side of Queen Charlotte Strait in the Central Coast region of British Columbia, Canada. It is adjacent to Sutlej Channel, which lies on the north side of Broughton Island, the largest of the group, between it and the mainland. Greenway Point is on the south side of the sound.
