= Bacchante-class corvette =

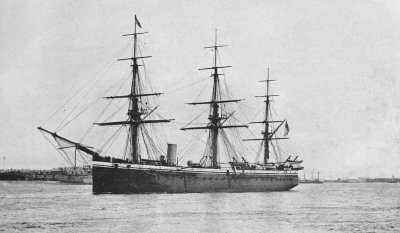
- HMS Bacchante

Class overview
- Name: Bacchante-class corvette; (later Bacchante-class cruiser)
- Builders: Portsmouth and Chatham Dockyards
- Operators: Royal Navy
- Preceded by: Emerald class
- Succeeded by: Comus class
- Built: 1875–1877
- In commission: 1877–1905
- Planned: 4
- Completed: 3
- Cancelled: 1
- Retired: 3

General characteristics
- Class & type: Iron screw corvettes; (cruisers from 1877)
- Displacement: 3,913-4,070 tons
- Length: 280 ft (85 m)
- Beam: 45 ft (14 m)
- Draught: 23 ft (7.0 m)
- Propulsion: Three-cylinder horizontal compound-expansion steam engine; 10 × cylindrical boilers; 1 × 21 ft (6.4 m) diameter screw
- Sail plan: Ship-rigged
- Speed: 15 knots (28 km/h; 17 mph)
- Complement: 375 (later 420)
- Armament: As built: 14 × 7-inch/112-pounder muzzle-loading rifled guns; 2 × 6.3-inch/64-pounder muzzle-loading rifled guns (not Bacchante); Later: 12 × 6-inch Mk II breech-loading guns; 4 × 5-inch breech-loading guns; Machine guns

The Bacchante class was a group of three iron screw corvettes in service with the Royal Navy from the late 1870s.

== Design and construction ==
The ships were designed by Nathaniel Barnaby in 1872, with the first two ordered from Portsmouth Royal Dockyard in 1872 and Euryalus from Chatham Royal Dockyard in 1873. These were the last ships to be built of iron for the Royal Navy, with teak planking. Although similar, the three ships differed in design and appearance, and thus did not technically form a single class. A fourth ship (Highflyer) was ordered in 1878 from Portsmouth Dockyard, but was cancelled in 1879. In 1887, like all the remaining corvettes, they were redesignated cruisers by the Royal Navy.

== Ships ==
| Name | Ship builder | Launched | Fate |
|---|---|---|---|
| Boadicea | Portsmouth Dockyard | 16 October 1875 | Sold 6 January 1905 |
| Bacchante | Portsmouth Dockyard | 19 October 1876 | Sold 10 May 1897 |
| Euryalus | Chatham Dockyard | 31 January 1877 | Sold 10 May 1897 |
| Highflyer | Cancelled 1879 | | |
