= Carwynnen Quoit =

Dolmen in the Cornwall region, England

- Giant's Quoit
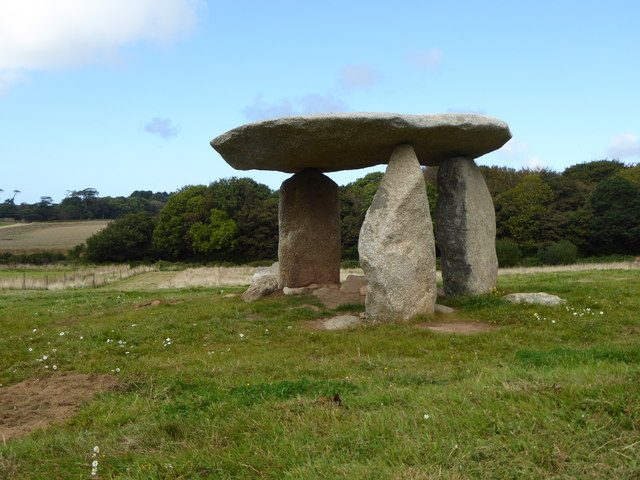
- The restored dolmen in 2014

- Location within Cornwall
- 50.18835°N 5.29378°W
- Type: Dolmen
- Periods: Neolithic
- Location: Cornwall, England, United Kingdom

History
- Built: c. 3000 BC

Site notes
- Material: Stone
- Height: 1.5 m (4 ft 11 in)
- Width: c. 3.3 m (11 ft)
- Condition: Destroyed: c. 1815; Rebuilt: June 2014

Carwynnen Quoit (grid reference SW650372) is a dolmen belonging to the Neolithic period, at Carwynnen near Camborne in west Cornwall. It is also known as 'The Giant's Quoit', 'The Giant's Frying Pan', 'Pendarvis Quoit' and 'Pendarves Quoit'. It collapsed in 1966 and was re-erected in 2014.

== Description ==
Carwynnen Quoit is one of an ancient and rare group of monuments and can be found at Carwynnen in Cornwall. It is a portal dolmen belonging to the Neolithic period, built around 3000 BC, one of the few Cornish portal dolmens to be found outside the Penwith peninsula. It is situated on a gentle west-facing slope between two small tributaries to the Red River. The dolmen stands to a height of 1.5 metres with a capstone measuring around 3.3 metres long by 2.5 metres wide and 30 cm thick and weighs around 10 tons.

== History ==
The site was first recorded by the Welsh antiquarian Edward Lhuyd around 1700 and a symbol of the cromlech appeared on Martyn's 1748 map of Cornwall. These are early references to ancient sites. The first plan and elevation was by Cornish antiquarian William Borlase in 1769. In his 1803 work Coloured Figures of English Fungi or Mushrooms, the English naturalist James Sowerby illustrated a yellow dust lichen, later identified as Chrysothrix chlorina, that was growing on the structure. In 1840, the field was recorded as the Frying Pan Field on the Tithe Apportionment Schedule. In 1891, it was recorded that "curious marks" had been noticed some years previously, "on a stone under a thorn tree, on the site of what seems to be a walled barrow, about 100 yards north of Carwynnen Quoit." The OS found no trace of the supposed walled barrow or interesting stonework in this area in 1971.

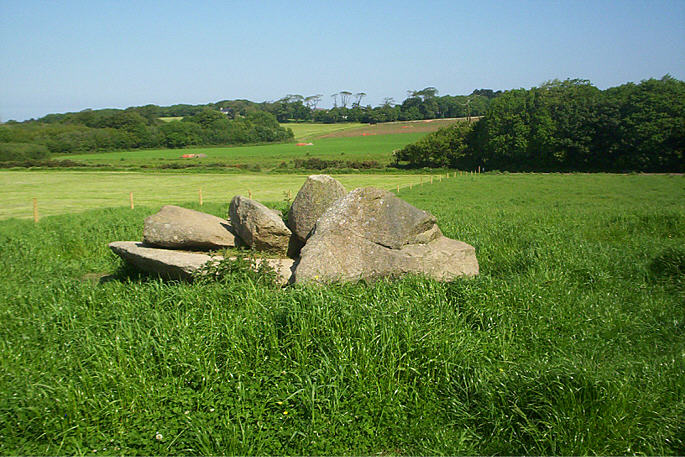
Collapsed remains of the dolmen in 2010

The dolmen collapsed around 1815, but was rebuilt by Lady Pendarves. It collapsed again in 1966. For the next 48 years, the structure lay on the ground with two of the supports lying on top of the capstone with the third lying beneath. The five-acre site was purchased by The Sustainable Trust in 2009. Together with the Cornwall Heritage Trust, they employed professional archaeologists to help research the site prior to its reconstruction.

In September 2012, an archaeological dig took place after a preliminary investigation in July 2012. Troon Primary School in September 2012 was the first school to be involved in a pilot archaeological week based on an education pack drawn up in 2009. During this time there was also an Open Day for the community at large to learn about the monument and archeology. Findings from the dig were on display for all to see and the event was televised. A website called the Giant's Quoit was created to showcase the finds, explain archaeological evidence and present the restoration process.

The first stones were re-erected in May 2014. Two support stones were replaced in their original Neolithic footings, but the third stone had to be adjusted to create a more stable structure. The work was completed in June 2014, when the capstone was dropped into position by a large crane.
