= HMS Sutlej =

Three ships of the Royal Navy and Royal Indian Navy have borne the name HMS Sutlej, after the Sutlej, a river that flows through modern day India and Pakistan:

- HMS Sutlej (1855) was a 50-gun fourth rate launched in 1855, but converted to screw propulsion and undocked in 1860. She was broken up in 1869.
- HMS Sutlej (1899) was a Cressy-class armoured cruiser launched in 1899 and sold in 1921. She was scrapped in 1924.
- HMIS Sutlej (U95) was a Black Swan-class sloop launched in 1940. She was used as a survey ship from 1955 and was paid off in 1978. She was deleted from the navy lists in 1982/83 and was broken up.
