= HMS Bacchante (1876) =

1876 Bacchante-class corvette

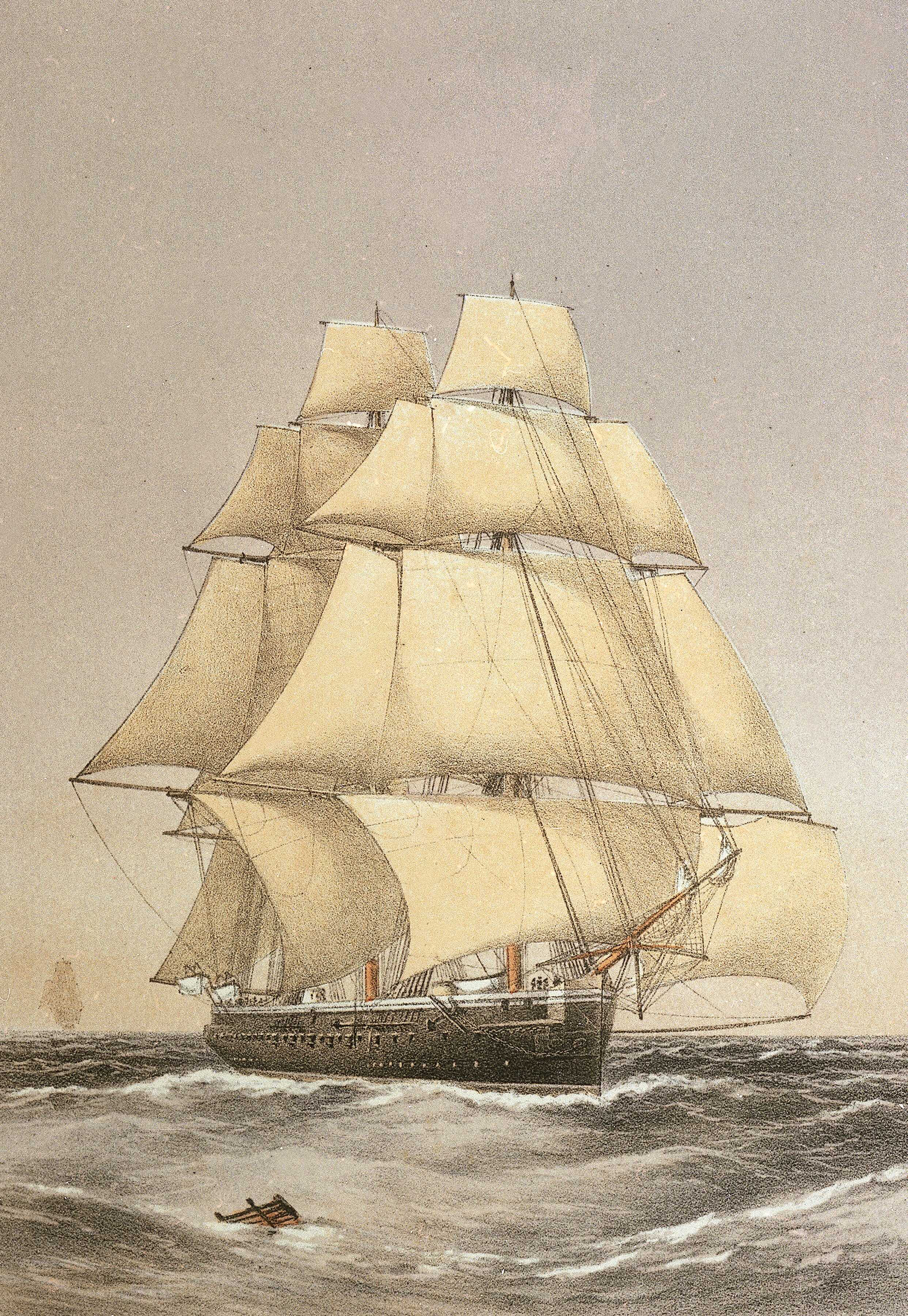

History

United Kingdom
- Name: HMS Bacchante
- Namesake: Bacchus
- Builder: Portsmouth Dockyard
- Launched: 19 October 1876
- Commissioned: 1878
- Fate: Sold for scrap in 1897

General characteristics
- Class & type: Bacchante-class corvette
- Displacement: 4,070 tons
- Tons burthen: 2,679 tons
- Length: 280 ft (85 m)
- Beam: 45.5 ft (13.9 m)
- Draught: 23.9 ft (7.3 m)
- Installed power: 10 × cylindrical boilers 5,420 ihp (4,040 kW)
- Propulsion: 1 × J. & G. Rennie triple Compound steam engine
- Speed: 15.06 kn (17.33 mph)
- Range: 3,000 nmi (3,500 mi)
- Armament: 14 × RML 7-inch gun; 2 × 64-pounder guns

HMS Bacchante was a Bacchante-class ironclad screw-propelled corvette of the Royal Navy. She is particularly famous for being the ship on which the Princes George and Albert served as midshipmen.

Bacchante was built at Portsmouth Dockyard and launched on 19 October 1876, the second ship of the three ship Bacchante class. She was armed with fourteen 7-inch (177.8 mm) muzzle-loading rifle guns and two 64-pounder torpedo carriages, and rated at 4070 tons.

== Royal crew ==
The two oldest sons of the Prince of Wales had entered the navy in 1877, and by 1879 it had been decided by the Royal Family and the Government that the two should undertake a cruise. They were assigned to Bacchante, which was then part of a squadron intended to patrol the sea lanes of the British Empire. Queen Victoria was concerned that the Bacchante might sink, drowning her grandchildren. Confident in their ship, the Admiralty sent Bacchante through a gale to prove she was sturdy enough to weather storms. The Princes, with their tutor John Neale Dalton, duly came aboard on 17 September 1879. The Bacchante was to be their home for the next three years.

They made a number of cruises to different parts of the Empire with the squadron. Serving aboard the squadron's flagship, HMS Inconstant at this time was their relation, Prince Louis of Battenberg. The squadron initially consisted of HMS Inconstant, Bacchante, Diamond and Topaze, the composition altering during the voyages as ships left, or were joined by new ones. Bacchante visited the Mediterranean and the West Indies, followed by later voyages to South America, South Africa, Australia, China and Japan. The Princes made regular diary entries, which were later published as two volumes in 1886 as The Cruise of Her Majesty's Ship Bacchante. Photographs from the trip were later donated by Rev. Dalton, their royal tutor, and are now part of the Royal Collection Trust.

Of note during this time, the Bacchante briefly assisted in the First Boer War, before the squadron sailed again for Australia. Shortly after reaching the coast on 12 May, a heavy storm blew up and when it had abated, Bacchante was missing. After three days searching, news reached the squadron that Bacchante had had her rudder disabled, but had been able to reach safety at Albany.

== Later career ==
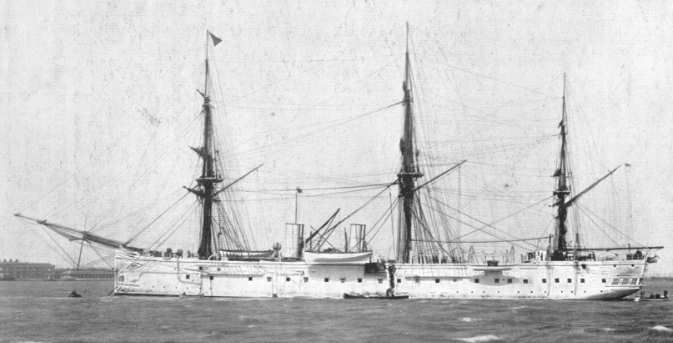
HMS Bacchante

Bacchante eventually returned to England in August 1882 and discharged her young Royal midshipmen. By then she had covered 40,000 miles, mostly under sail, and had rounded the Cape of Good Hope twice. She became the only British vessel in which two grandsons of the reigning monarch served at the same time. Bacchante was then paid off and underwent a long refit, which saw her being partially rearmed. She was then dispatched to the East Indies to relieve her sister, HMS Euryalus, as flagship on the station. Bacchante served during the Third Anglo-Burmese War in 1885, transferring three-quarters of her complement to serve on gunboats on the Irrawaddy River or in the suppression of banditry. She returned to Britain in 1888 and was placed in reserve. She was sold to the shipbreakers Cohen in 1897, and scrapped.

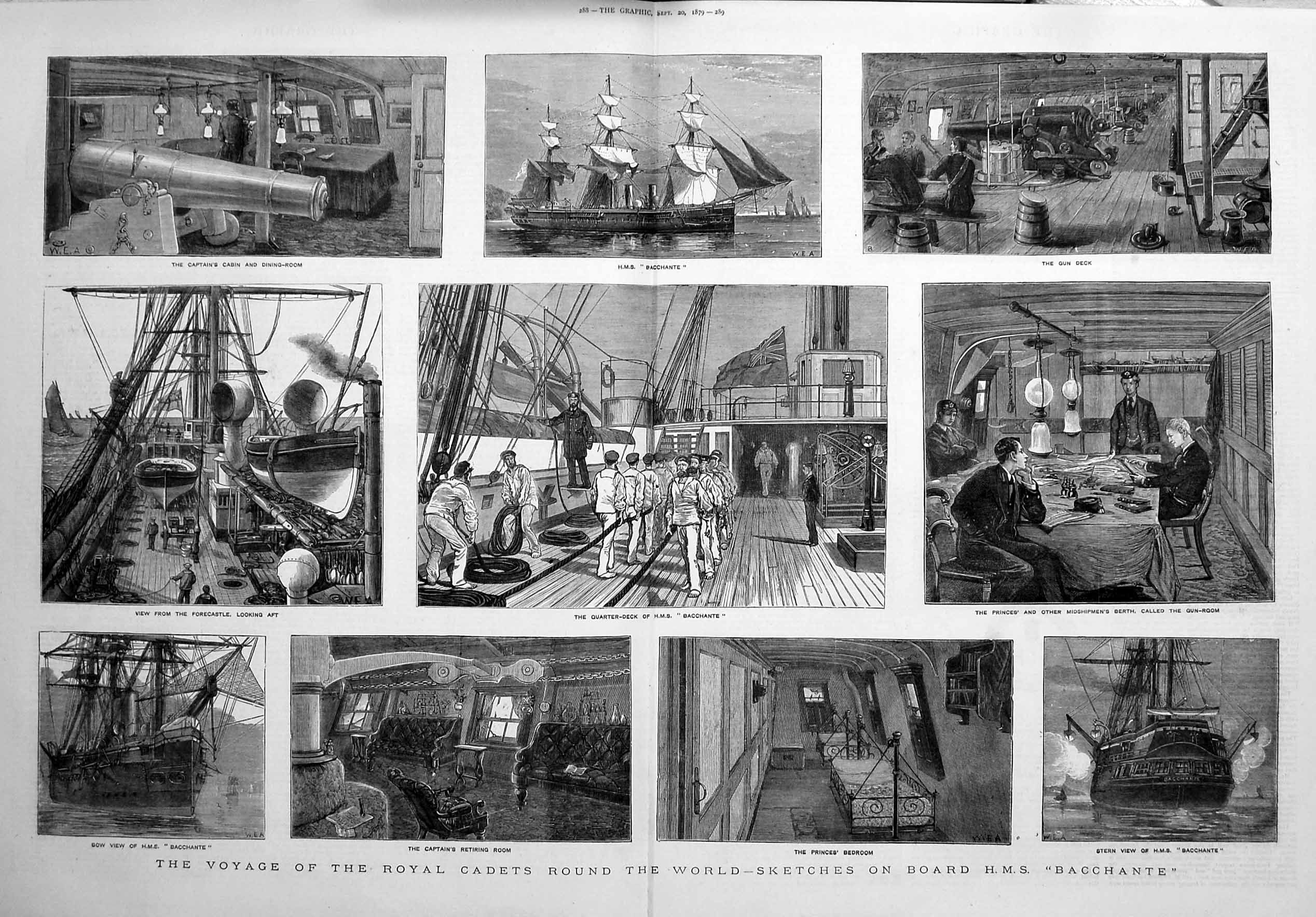
The voyage of the royal cadets round the world, sketches on board HMS 'Bacchante' - The Graphic 1879

== Bibliography ==
- Colledge, J. J.; Warlow, Ben (2006) [1969]. Ships of the Royal Navy: The Complete Record of All Fighting Ships of the Royal Navy from the 15th Century to the Present (3rd Rev ed.). London: Chatham Publishing. ISBN 978-1-86176-281-8. OCLC 67375475.
- Carlton, Charles (2003). Royal Warriors: A Military History of the British Monarchy. Pearson Education. ISBN 1-77007-303-5.
- Dixon, Conrad (1987). Ships of the Victorian Navy. Southampton: Ashford Press Publishing. ISBN 1-85253-024-3.
- Gordon, Peter (2003). Royal Education: Past, Present, and Future. Routledge. ISBN 0-582-47265-2.
- Hopkins, Pat (2006). Ghosts of South Africa. Zebra. ISBN 0-7146-8386-8.
- Percy, Scott (2008). Fifty Years in the Royal Navy. Read Books. ISBN 978-1-4097-0341-9.
- Windsor, Prince Albert Victor; Wales, Prince George; Dalton, John N. (1886). The Cruise of Her Majesty's Ship "Bacchante" 1879-1882. London: MacMillan and Co.
