= Commodore-in-Chief =

Honorary appointment in Commonwealth realms

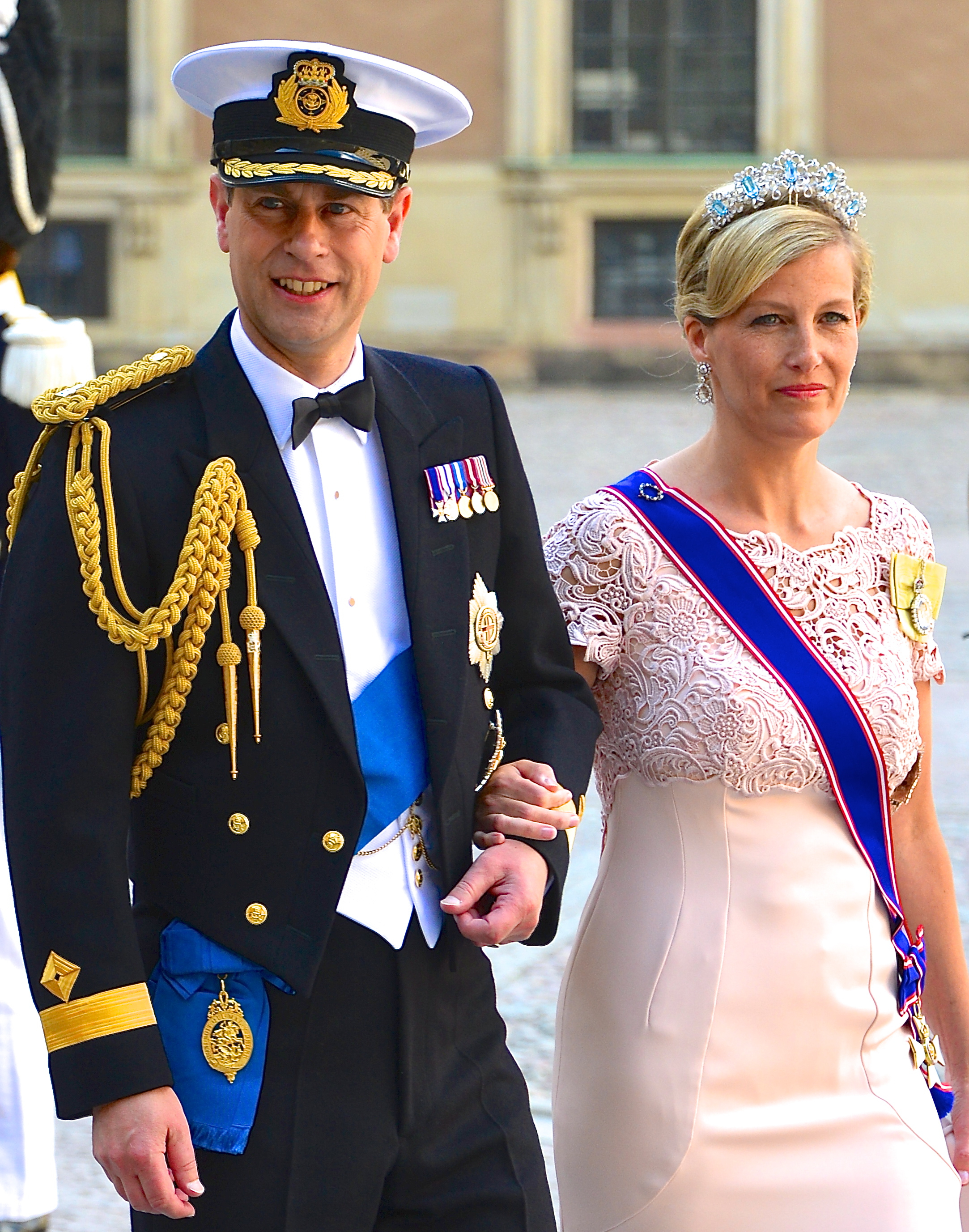
Prince Edward, Duke of Edinburgh in the No 2 Dress uniform of an RFA Commodore, 2013

Commodore-in-chief is an honorary appointment bestowed by the monarch of the Commonwealth realms on various members of the Royal Family. Previously, there have been honorary air commodores-in-chief in the British Royal Air Force and Royal Canadian Air Force, but no parallel affiliations with the navies of either country.

Commodore-in-Chief is an appointment rather than a rank. Holding an appointment of commodore-in-chief does not confer upon the holder the rank of commodore or indeed any other rank. Members of the Royal Family wear the uniform of their rank and are not issued with a different uniform for the appointment. However, Prince Edward, Duke of Edinburgh, who was appointed the Commodore-in-Chief of the Royal Fleet Auxiliary in 2006, has since appeared in the uniform of an RFA Commodore followed by The Prince of Wales in 2023 when he wore the uniform of a RN Commodore.

== Canada ==
It was announced on 3 May 2015 that Charles, Prince of Wales, and Anne, Princess Royal, had been appointed by their mother, the Queen of Canada, as commodores-in-chief; Charles is Commodore-in-Chief (Fleet Atlantic) and Anne Commodore-in-Chief (Fleet Pacific). The appointment was timed to coincide with the 70th anniversary of the cessation of the Battle of the Atlantic.

== United Kingdom ==
Admiral Sir Jonathon Band, First Sea Lord, said on news of the appointments: "They firmly underline the strength of the bond between the Royal Family and the Armed Forces, not least the Naval Service in which so many members of the Royal family have served with great distinction over the years."

Holder	Naval rank (if any)	Appointment	Dates
The King	Admiral of the Fleet	Commodore-in-Chief, Plymouth; Commodore-in-Chief, Aircraft Carriers	2006; 2019
The Queen	-	Commodore-in-Chief, Naval Medical Services; Commodore-in-Chief, Royal Navy Chaplaincy Service	2006
The Prince of Wales	Commander	Commodore-in-Chief, Scotland; Commodore-in-Chief, Submarines	2006
The Princess of Wales	-	Commodore-in-Chief, Fleet Air Arm	2023
The Duke of Edinburgh	-	Commodore-in-Chief, Royal Fleet Auxiliary	2006
The Princess Royal	Admiral	Commodore-in-Chief, Portsmouth	2006
Prince Michael of Kent	Vice-Admiral	Commodore-in-Chief, Maritime Reserves	2006
Vacant	-	Commodore-in-Chief, Small Ships and Diving	Since 2021

Appointees may wear the uniform and insignia of a Royal Navy Commodore, with insignia of the service (i.e. the Submarine Warfare Insignia), with many appointment holders opting to wear the naval uniform of their substantive or higher honorary rank.

== Malaysia ==
As a member of the Commonwealth, Malaysia inherited British naval customs and traditions. The origins of the Royal Malaysian Navy (RMN) can be traced to 1934, when naval formations were first established in British Malaya under British administration. There is no surviving record of who held the honorary appointment of Commodore-in-Chief for these pre-independence formations, though it is most likely that the British monarch fulfilled the role.

Following independence, the appointment of Commodore-in-Chief of the Royal Malaysian Navy was reintroduced, with Malay rulers subsequently installed to hold this honorary distinction. The list of holders is as follows:

- Commodore-in-chief of the Royal Malaysian Navy
  - Sultan Sir Ismail of Johor (1960–1981)
  - Sultan Iskandar of Johor (1981–1984), later appointed as the Colonel-in-Chief of the Gerak Khas starting in 1984
  - Sultan Salahuddin of Selangor (1984–2001)
  - Sultan Sharafuddin of Selangor (2001–present)
