= Air commodore-in-chief =

Honorary rank in some Commonwealth realms

Air Commodore-in-Chief is a senior honorary air force appointment which originated in the Royal Air Force and now exists in the air forces of various Commonwealth realms. Appointees are made Air Commodore-in-Chief of a large air force organisation or formation. Initially only the British monarch held air commodore-in-chief appointments. However, since the second half of the 20th century, other members of the royal family have been appointed to such positions in the United Kingdom and the other realms such as Australia, Canada and New Zealand. As of 2020, these appointments have been given to just six senior members of the royal family, of whom four were reigning or future monarchs of the Commonwealth realms.

Air commodore-in-chief appointments do not confer a rank, be it air commodore or otherwise. Air commodore-in-chief appointments are more senior than honorary air commodore appointments. The equivalent naval title of Commodore-in-Chief was introduced in 2006.

== Air commodores-in-chief ==
=== Edward, Prince of Wales/ King Edward VIII ===
Edward, Prince of Wales (later King Edward VIII and then Duke of Windsor), held the following appointments:

United Kingdom

- (United Kingdom) 1932 –1936 : Air Commodore-in-Chief of the Auxiliary Air Force

=== King George VI ===
King George VI held the following appointments:

United Kingdom

- (United Kingdom) 1936 – 1952: Air Commodore-in-Chief of the Auxiliary Air Force (The Royal Auxiliary Air Force from 1947)
- 1941 – 1952: Air Commodore-in-Chief of the Air Training Corps
- (United Kingdom) 1947 – 1952: Air Commodore-in-Chief of the Royal Air Force Regiment
- 1950 – 1952: Air Commodore-in-Chief of the Royal Observer Corps

=== Queen Elizabeth II ===
Queen Elizabeth II held the following appointments:

Australia

- (Australia) 1954 – 2022 : Air Commodore-in-Chief of the Australian Citizen Air Force

Canada

- (Canada) 1953 – 1968: Air Commodore-in-Chief of the Royal Canadian Air Force Auxiliary

New Zealand

- 1953 – 2022: Air Commodore-in-Chief of the Territorial Air Force of New Zealand

United Kingdom

- (United Kingdom) 1953 – 2022: Air Commodore-in-Chief of the Royal Auxiliary Air Force
- (United Kingdom) 1953 – 2022: Air Commodore-in-Chief of the Royal Air Force Regiment
- 1953 – 1996: Air Commodore-in-Chief of the Royal Observer Corps

=== Prince Philip ===
Prince Philip, Duke of Edinburgh, held the following appointments:

/ Canada

- (Canada) / (Canada) 1953 – 2021: Air Commodore-in-Chief of the Royal Canadian Air Cadets

United Kingdom

- 1953 – 2015: Air Commodore-in-Chief of the Air Training Corps

=== King Charles III ===
King Charles III, held the following appointments:

New Zealand

- 1977 –2015: Air Commodore-in-Chief of the Royal New Zealand Air Force

United Kingdom

- (United Kingdom) 2022 –present: Air Commodore-in-Chief of the Royal Air Force

== Royal Malaysian Air Force ==
As a member of the Commonwealth, Malaysia adopted British military customs and traditions. The Royal Malaysian Air Force (RMAF) was formally established in 1958; however, its lineage can be traced to earlier joint air force units of the Commonwealth in British Malaya. The most notable of these was the Malayan Auxiliary Air Force, formed in 1934, which consisted of personnel drawn from both the Royal Air Force (RAF) and the Royal Australian Air Force (RAAF).

There is no definitive record identifying the Air Commodore-in-Chief of pre-independence Malaya, although it is generally assumed that the British monarch held the honorary position. The appointment was reintroduced in 1966, when the Malay monarch was installed as Air Commodore-in-Chief of the Royal Malaysian Air Force. The holders of this honorary appointment are as follows:

- Air Commodore-in-Chief of the Royal Malaysian Air Force
  - Sultan Salahuddin of Selangor (1966–1984), later appointed as the Commodore-in-Chief of the Royal Malaysian Navy starting 1984
  - Sultan Ahmad Shah of Pahang (1984–2019)
  - Sultan Abdullah of Pahang (2019–present)
