= Royal family orders of the United Kingdom =

Decorations conferred by the British sovereign to their female relations

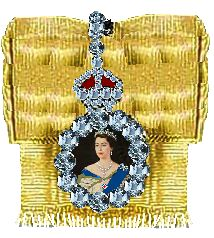
Insignia of the Royal Family Order of Elizabeth II

The sovereign of the United Kingdom may award a royal family order to female members of the British royal family, as they typically do not wear the commemorative medals that men do. The same practice is in place in the royal families of Norway, Sweden, Denmark, the Netherlands, Thailand, and Tonga. The order is a personal memento rather than a state decoration. It is therefore not announced in The London Gazette, and who held which decoration must be inferred from portraits and documents.

== History ==
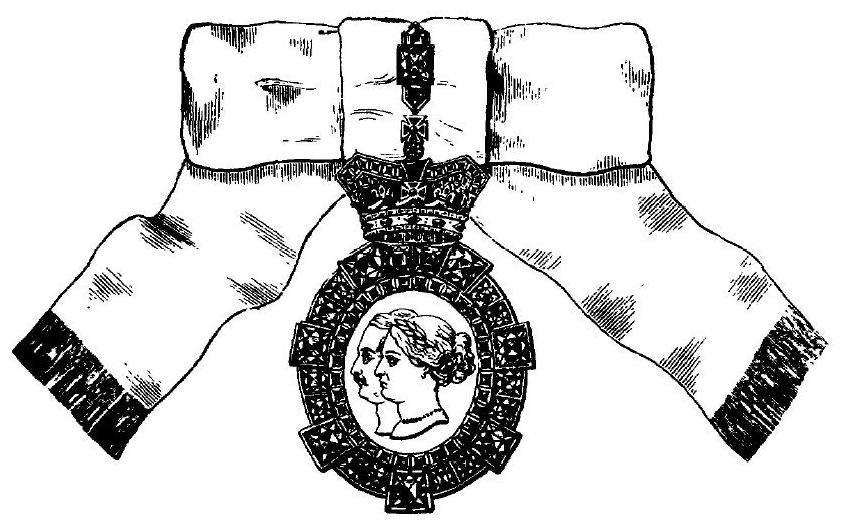
The insignia of ladies of the first class of the Royal Order of Victoria and Albert

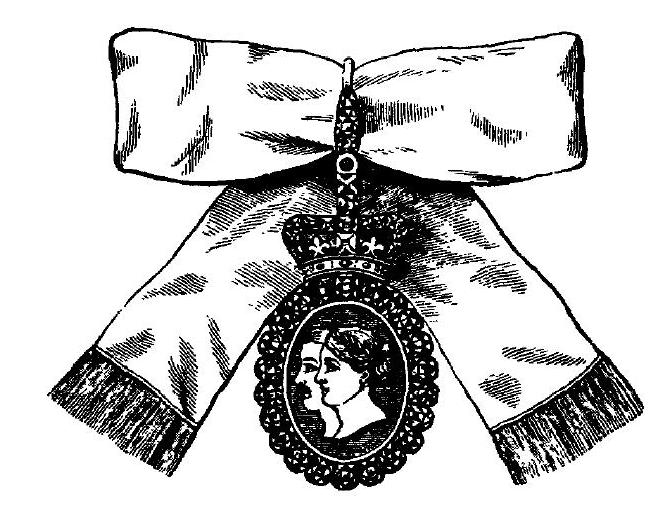
The insignia of ladies of the second class of the Royal Order of Victoria and Albert.

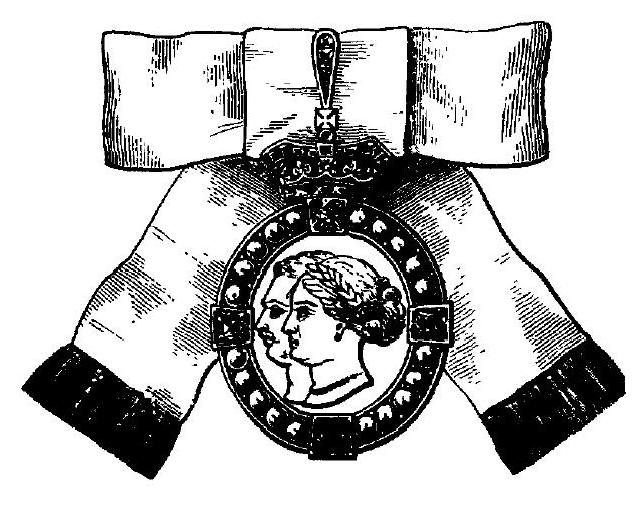
The insignia of ladies of the third class of the Order of Victoria and Albert.

The first royal family order was issued during the regency and reign of George IV. Prior to his accession in 1820, he started the practice of presenting his portrait set in diamonds to ladies and gentlemen of the court, particularly female members of the royal family. The frame that surrounded his portrait might be a diamond wreath, of varying complexity, surmounted with a crown, or in a star pattern, with no crown. The badge was suspended from a white silk bow which varied for men and women. As a young woman, Princess Alexandrina Victoria of Kent (later Queen Victoria) received this badge from her uncle, on a blue ribbon.

William IV issued no royal family order, choosing to give other jewellery as tokens of his esteem.

Queen Victoria gave miniature pendant portraits of herself to her first two daughters, Victoria and Alice, on the occasion of their confirmation. In 1862, soon after her widowhood, she instituted the Royal Order of Victoria and Albert, which then served as her royal family order. The badge consisted of a cameo portrait of Victoria and Albert, and was suspended from a white ribbon. Victoria wore the sovereign's badge of the order, with Albert's image in front of her own; in all the other badges, her image was in front. No Royal Family Order since has been conferred on ladies of the court, and no sovereign since has worn his or her own order. The order was enlarged several times. As finally constituted, the first and second classes wore a portrait badge bordered with diamonds, the third class (for ladies of the Bedchamber) a portrait badge bordered with pearls, the fourth class (for women of the Bedchamber) a royal cipher. Since this was an official order (conferring the postnominal initials VA) the insignia was returnable after the holder's death. The order was not conferred after the death of Victoria, but continued in existence as long as there was a living member (Victoria's granddaughter Princess Alice, Countess of Athlone died in 1981), so subsequent sovereigns including Queen Elizabeth II were sovereigns of the order, and wore the sovereign's badge. Queen Mary was recipient of five royal orders (Victoria and Albert, Edward VII, George V, George VI and Elizabeth II).

== Insignia ==
Since the accession of Edward VII the badge of the order consists of a portrait of the sovereign set in diamonds, and is suspended from a ribbon formed into a bow. The ribbon of the royal family order changes with each monarch. Edward VII's was variegated of red, black, blue, and gold. George V's was pale blue. George VI's was rose pink. Each contained a portrait of the king in uniform. The reverse of the order contains the royal cypher of the sovereign. Edward VIII, king for less than a year, did not issue a family order.

The Royal Family Order of Elizabeth II depicts her in evening dress wearing the ribbon and star of the Order of the Garter. The miniature, painted on ivory (glass since 2017), is bordered by diamonds and surmounted by a Tudor Crown in diamonds and red enamel. The reverse, in silver-gilt, is patterned with rays and depicts the royal cypher and St Edward's Crown in gold and enamel. The watered silk ribbon is chartreuse yellow.

Charles III's order debuted on 25 June 2024, when Queen Camilla wore it at a state banquet in honour of the Emperor and Empress of Japan. The King's portrait as Admiral of the Fleet is painted on polymin, a synthetic material. The ribbon is pale blue.

== Wearing the Order ==
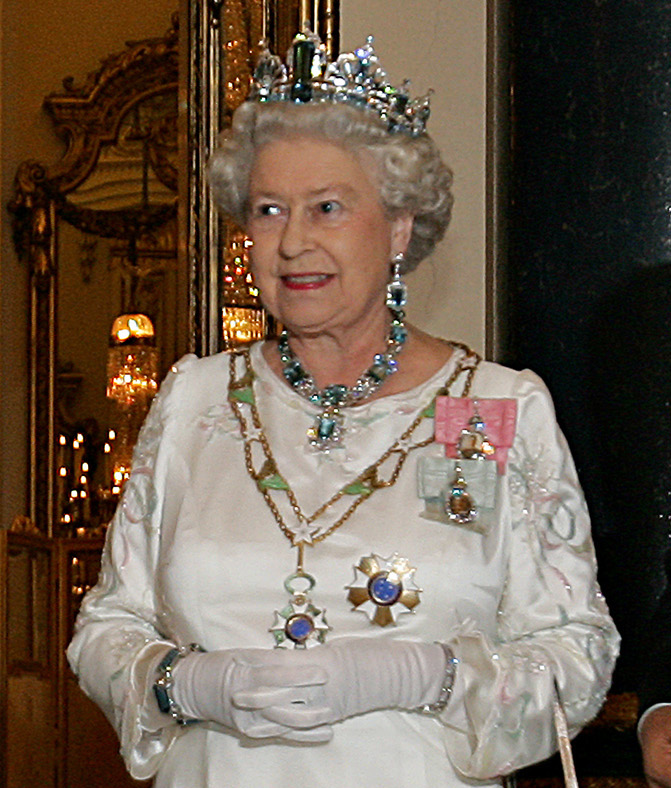
Queen Elizabeth II wearing the royal family orders of King George V (her grandfather) and King George VI (her father) in 2006. The star and collar are a Brazilian decoration, the Order of the Southern Cross.

The royal family orders are worn pinned to the left shoulder at formal evening occasions when other orders and decorations are worn. If a sash is also worn over the left shoulder, the order is pinned to the sash. If more than one Royal Family Order is worn, the most recent is placed uppermost.

== Similar royal badges ==
Queen Alexandra presented miniature portraits of herself with King Edward VII to her eldest daughter, Louise, Princess Royal; to her second daughter, Princess Victoria; and to her daughter-in-law Mary of Teck. The ribbon was red and white, like the ribbon of the order of Alexandra's father, Christian IX of Denmark, which she wore almost constantly.

Those who served as Mistress of the Robes to Elizabeth II received a badge of office, which was distinct from the Royal Family Order but designed along similar lines: a jewelled royal cypher, worn on a yellow ribbon; it was worn on state occasions and at other events, as appropriate. The Queen's other ladies-in-waiting wore their own distinctive badge: a jewelled letter 'E' within an oval frame, worn on a pink silk ribbon.

== Gallery ==
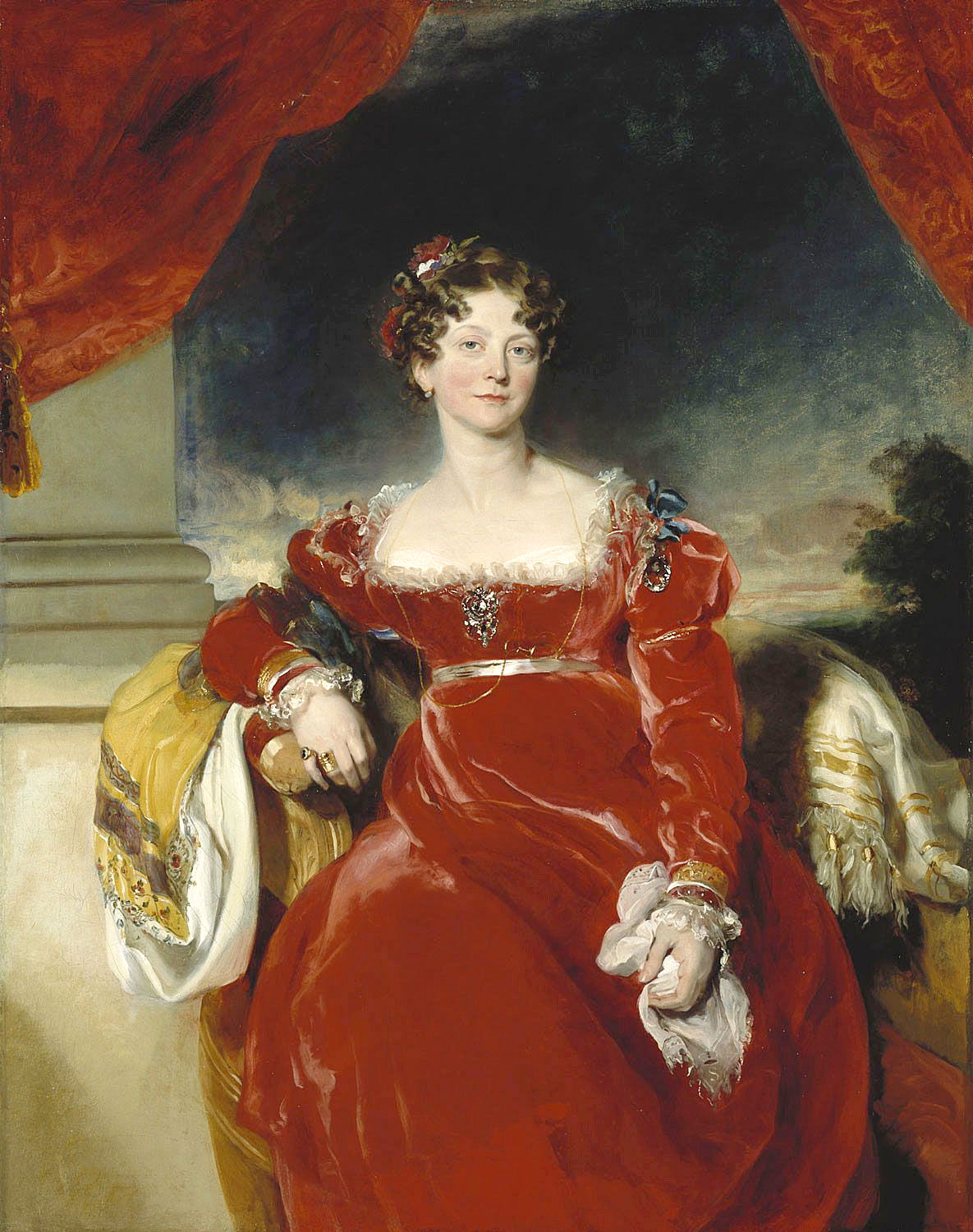
Princess Sophia wearing the royal family order of King George IV (her brother) in a portrait.

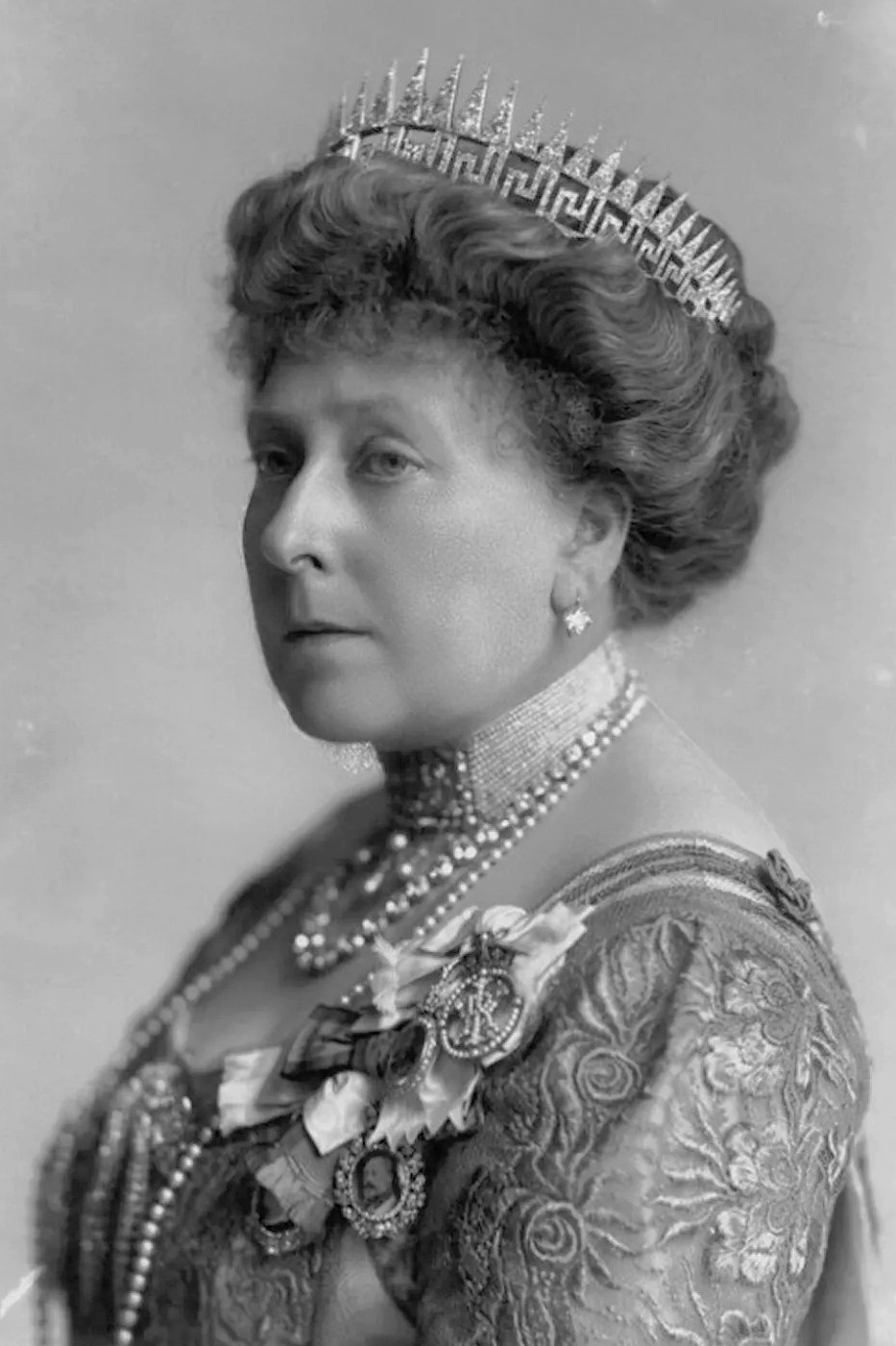
Princess Henry of Battenberg wearing the royal family orders of Queen Victoria and Prince Albert (her parents), King Edward VII (her brother) and King George V (her nephew).

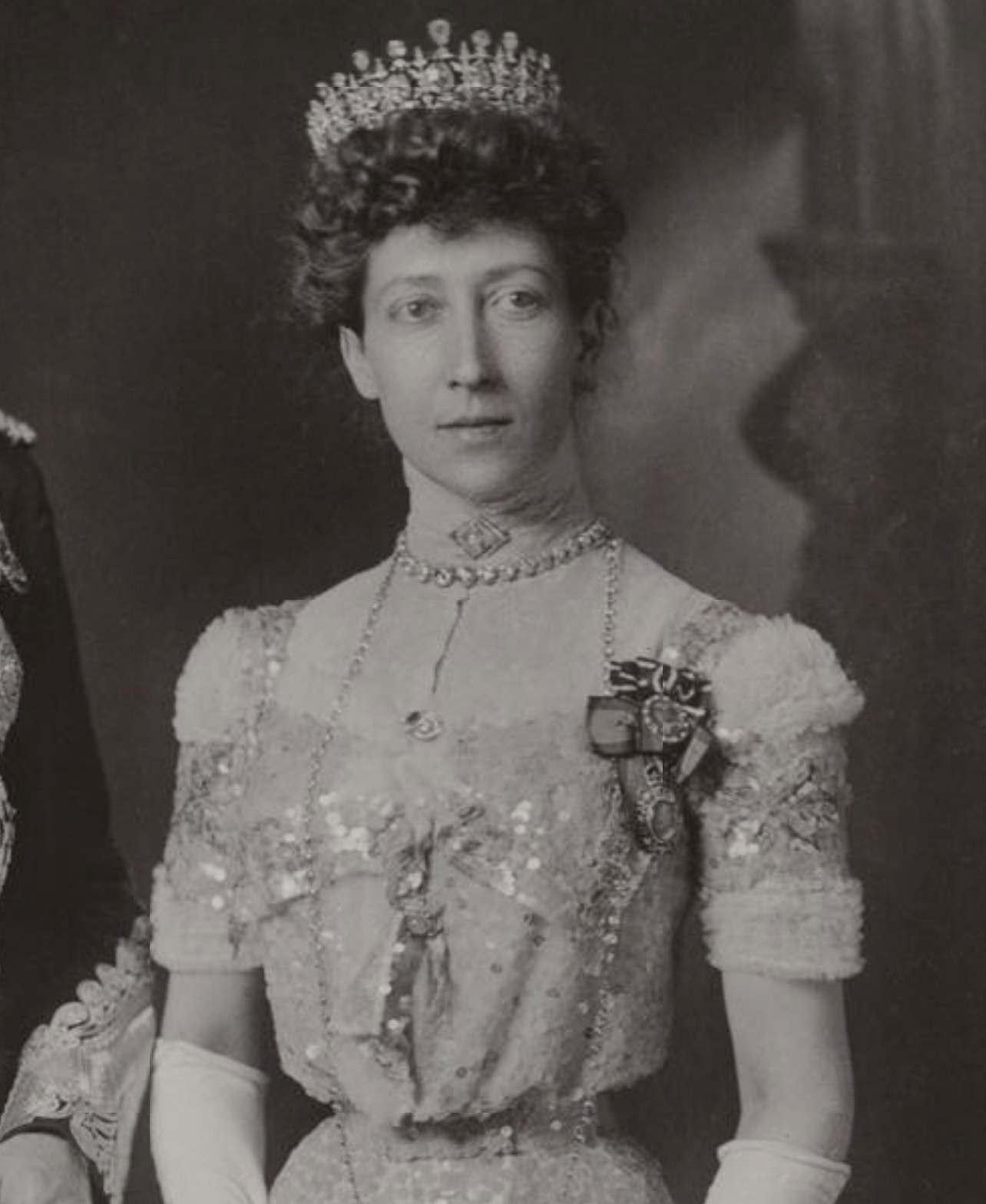
The Princess Royal and Duchess of Fife wearing the royal family orders of King Edward VII (her father) and Queen Alexandra (her mother).

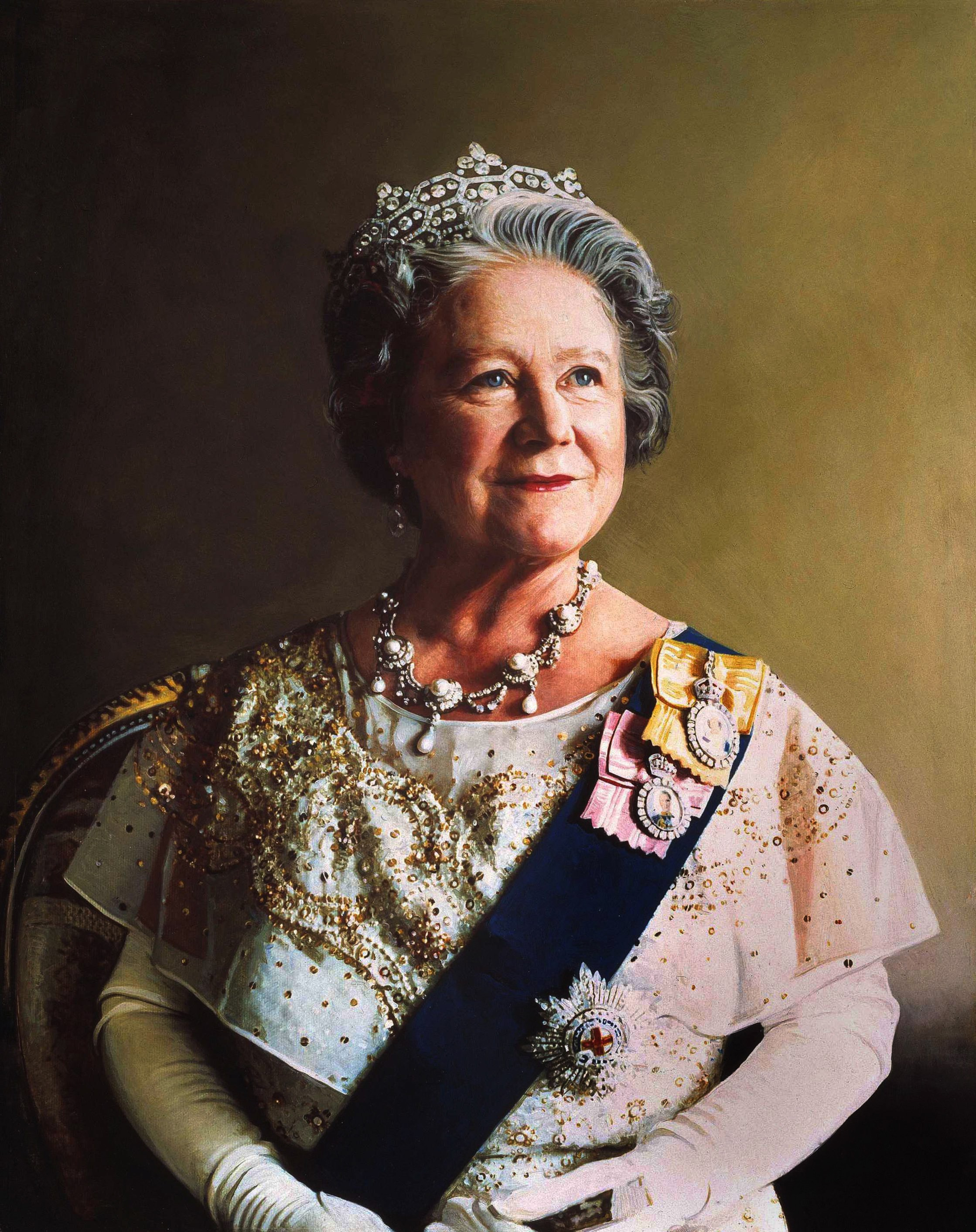
Queen Elizabeth the Queen Mother wearing the royal family orders of King George VI (her husband) and Queen Elizabeth II (her daughter) in a portrait.

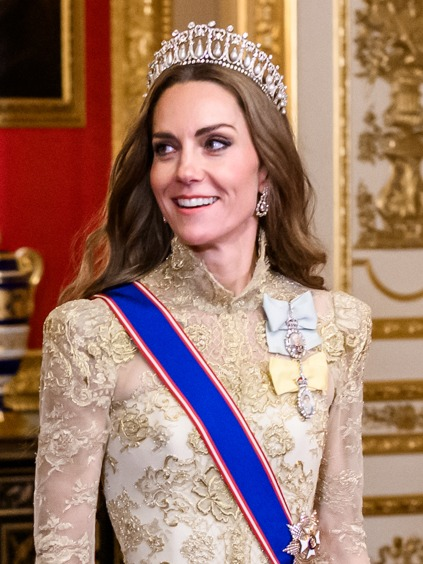
The Princess of Wales wearing the royal family orders of Queen Elizabeth II (her grandmother-in-law) and King Charles III (her father-in-law).

== List of Royal Family Orders of the United Kingdom ==
- Royal Family Order of George IV
- Royal Order of Victoria and Albert
- Royal Family Order of Edward VII
- Royal Family Order of George V
- Royal Family Order of George VI
- Royal Family Order of Elizabeth II
- Royal Family Order of Charles III
