= List of titles and honours of Queen Elizabeth the Queen Mother =

Queen Elizabeth the Queen Mother received numerous appointments, including to orders, decorations and medals, during and after her time as consort to King George VI. Each is listed below; where two dates are shown, the first indicates the date of receiving the award or title, and the second indicates the date of its loss or renunciation:

== Titles and styles ==
Styles of Queen Elizabeth
- Reference style: Her Majesty
- Spoken style: Your Majesty

- 4 August 1900 – 16 February 1904: The Honourable Elizabeth Bowes-Lyon
- 16 February 1904 – 26 April 1923: Lady Elizabeth Bowes-Lyon
- 26 April 1923 – 11 December 1936: Her Royal Highness The Duchess of York
- 11 December 1936 – 6 February 1952: Her Majesty The Queen
- 6 February 1952 – 30 March 2002: Her Majesty Queen Elizabeth The Queen Mother

Her British honours were read out at her funeral, held in the United Kingdom, by Sir Peter Gwynn-Jones, Garter Principal King of Arms, as follows:

Thus it hath pleased Almighty God to take out of this transitory life unto His Divine Mercy the late Most High, Most Mighty and Most Excellent Princess Elizabeth, Queen Dowager and Queen Mother, Lady of the Most Noble Order of the Garter, Lady of the Most Ancient and Most Noble Order of the Thistle, Lady of the Imperial Order of the Crown of India, Grand Master and Dame Grand Cross of the Royal Victorian Order upon whom had been conferred the Royal Victorian Chain, Dame Grand Cross of the Most Excellent Order of the British Empire, Dame Grand Cross of the Most Venerable Order of the Hospital of St John of Jerusalem, Relict of His Majesty King George the Sixth and Mother of Her Most Excellent Majesty Elizabeth The Second by the Grace of God of the United Kingdom of Great Britain and Northern Ireland and of her other Realms and Territories Queen, Head of the Commonwealth, Defender of the Faith, Sovereign of the Most Noble Order of the Garter, whom may God preserve and bless with long life, health and honour and all worldly happiness.

In the memorial service held in Canada, her Canadian honours, the Canadian Forces' Decoration and Order of Canada, were read out.

== British Commonwealth and Commonwealth of Nations honours ==
Appointments, including honours
Country	Date	Appointment	Ribbon	Post-nominal letters
United Kingdom	1923	Member of the Royal Family Order of George V		
(United Kingdom) British Empire and Commonwealth	8 March 1923	Lady of Grace of the Most Venerable Order of the Hospital of Saint John of Jerusalem		LGStJ
(United Kingdom) British Empire and Commonwealth	6 June 1924	Lady of Justice of the Most Venerable Order of the Hospital of Saint John of Jerusalem		LJStJ
(United Kingdom) British Empire and Commonwealth	12 June 1926	Dame Grand Cross of the Most Venerable Order of the Hospital of Saint John of Jerusalem		GCStJ
United Kingdom	8 July 1927	Dame Grand Cross of the Most Excellent Order of the British Empire		GBE
British India	1931	Member of the Imperial Order of the Crown of India		CI
United Kingdom	14 December 1936	Royal Lady of the Most Noble Order of the Garter		LG
(United Kingdom) British Empire and Commonwealth	1 February 1937	Grand Master and Principal Dame Grand Cross of the Royal Victorian Order		GCVO
United Kingdom	1937	Member of the Royal Family Order of George VI		
United Kingdom	11 May 1937	Extra Lady of the Most Ancient and Most Noble Order of the Thistle		LT
United Kingdom	1952	Member of the Royal Family Order of Elizabeth II		
Canada	1966	Member of the Order of the Dogwood		OD
United Kingdom	1978	Lord Warden of the Cinque Ports		
New Zealand	1990	Additional Member of the Order of New Zealand		ONZ
Canada	2000	Extraordinary Companion of the Order of Canada		CC

Decorations and medals
Country	Date	Decoration	Ribbon	Post-nominal letters
(United Kingdom) British Empire and Commonwealth	1936	Member of the Royal Red Cross		RRC
(United Kingdom) British Empire and Commonwealth	11 May 1937	Recipient of the Royal Victorian Chain		
(United Kingdom) British Empire and Commonwealth	1935	Recipient of the King George V Silver Jubilee Medal		
(United Kingdom) British Empire and Commonwealth	1937	Recipient of the King George VI Coronation Medal		
(United Kingdom) British Empire and Commonwealth	1953	Recipient of the Queen Elizabeth II Coronation Medal		
(United Kingdom) British Empire and Commonwealth	1977	Recipient of the Queen Elizabeth II Silver Jubilee Medal		
(United Kingdom) British Empire and Commonwealth	2002	Recipient of the Queen Elizabeth II Golden Jubilee Medal		
Canada	1951	Recipient of the Canadian Forces' Decoration and Five Bars		CD

Awards
Country	Date	Award
United Kingdom	1961	Recipient of the Royal Horticultural Society Victoria Medal of Honour

== Foreign honours ==
Appointments
Country	Date	Appointment	Ribbon	Post-nominal letters
(Kingdom of Yugoslavia) Yugoslavia	1923	Dame Grand Cross of the Royal Order of Saint Sava		
Afghanistan	1928	Member First Class of the Order of the Supreme Sun		
Japan	1937	Dame Grand Cordon of the Order of the Precious Crown		
France	July 1938	Grand Cross of the National Order of the Legion of Honour		
(Kingdom of Romania) Romania	1938	Dame Grand Cross of the Order of the Crown of Romania		
Nepal	1948	Member Grand Cross of the Order of Ojaswi Rajanya		
Netherlands	1950	Dame Grand Cross of the Order of the Netherlands Lion		
Greece	1950	Dame Grand Cross of the Royal Family Order of Saints Olga and Sophia		MSOS
Peru	1960	Grand Cross of the Order of the Sun		
Tunisia	1961	Grand Cordon of the Order of Independence		

Decorations
Country	Date	Decoration	Ribbon
France	1945	Recipient of the Red Cross Medal	
Norway	1945	Recipient of the Norwegian War Cross	

== Honorary military positions ==
Australia

- (Australia) 1953 – 30 March 2002: Colonel-in-Chief of the Royal Australian Army Medical Corps

Canada

- (Canada) 1938 – 30 March 2002: Colonel-in-Chief of the Toronto Scottish Regiment (Queen Elizabeth the Queen Mother's Own)
- 1947 – 30 March 2002: Colonel-in-Chief of the Black Watch (Royal Highland Regiment) of Canada
- (Canada) 1953–1974: Colonel-in-Chief of the Royal Canadian Army Medical Corps
- (Canada) 1977 – 30 March 2002: Colonel-in-Chief of the Canadian Forces Medical Service

New Zealand

- 1939 – 30 March 2002: Colonel-in-Chief of the New Zealand Scottish Regiment
- 1977 – 30 March 2002: Colonel-in-Chief of the Royal New Zealand Army Medical Corps

South Africa

- (South Africa) 1947–1961: Colonel-in-Chief of the Witwatersrand Rifles
- (South Africa) 1947–1961: Colonel-in-Chief of the Queen's Own Cape Town Highlanders
- (South Africa) 1956–1961: Colonel-in-Chief of the Transvaal Scottish

Southern Rhodesia

- (Southern Rhodesia) 1955–1965: Honorary Commissioner of the British South Africa Police

Rhodesia

(Rhodesia) 1965–1970: Honorary Commissioner of the British South Africa Police

United Kingdom

- (United Kingdom) 1927–1968: Colonel-in-Chief of the King's Own Yorkshire Light Infantry
- (United Kingdom) 1930–1961: Honorary Colonel the Hertfordshire Regiment
- (United Kingdom) 1935 – 30 March 2002: Royal Honorary Colonel The London Scottish
- (United Kingdom) 1937–1959: Colonel-in-Chief of the Queen's Bays (2nd Dragoon Guards)
- (United Kingdom) 1937 – 30 March 2002: Colonel-in-Chief of the Black Watch (Royal Highland Regiment)
- (United Kingdom) 1942 – 30 March 2002: Colonel-in-Chief of the Royal Army Medical Corps
- (United Kingdom) 1947–1958: Colonel-in-Chief of the 7th (Queen's Own) Hussars
- (United Kingdom) 1947 – 30 March 2002: Colonel-in-Chief of the Bedfordshire and Hertfordshire Regiment
- (United Kingdom) 1947 – 30 March 2002: Colonel-in-Chief of the Manchester Regiment
- (United Kingdom) 1949 – 30 March 2002: Commandant-in-Chief of the Women's Royal Army Corps
- (United Kingdom) 1952–1961: Royal Honorary Colonel of the City of London Yeomanry (Rough Riders)
- (United Kingdom) 1953 – September 1960: Colonel-in-Chief of the 9th Queen's Royal Lancers
- (United Kingdom) 1957–1961: Colonel-in-Chief of the Inns of Court Regiment
- (United Kingdom) 1958 – 30 March 2002: Colonel-in-Chief of the 3rd East Anglian Regiment (16th/44th Foot)
- (United Kingdom) 1958–1989: Royal Honorary Colonel of the University of London OTC
- (United Kingdom) 1958 – 30 March 2002: Colonel-in-Chief of the King's Regiment
- (United Kingdom) 1958 – 30 March 2002: Colonel-in-Chief of the Queen's Own Hussars
- (United Kingdom) 1959 – 30 March 2002: Colonel-in-Chief of the 1st The Queen's Dragoon Guards
- (United Kingdom) 1960 – 30 March 2002: Colonel-in-Chief of the 9th/12th Royal Lancers (Prince of Wales's)
- (United Kingdom) 1961 – 30 March 2002: Royal Honorary Colonel of the Bedfordshire and Hertfordshire Regiment
- (United Kingdom) 1961 – 30 March 2002: Royal Honorary Colonel of the Inns of Court & City Yeomanry
- (United Kingdom) 1964 – 30 March 2002: Colonel-in-Chief of the Royal Anglian Regiment
- (United Kingdom) 1967 – 30 March 2002: Honorary Colonel of the Royal Yeomanry
- (United Kingdom) 1967–1968: Honorary Colonel of The London Yeomanry and Territorials
- (United Kingdom) 1968 – 30 March 2002: Colonel-in-Chief of the Light Infantry
- (United Kingdom) 1993 – 30 March 2002: Colonel-in-Chief of the Queen's Royal Hussars (The Queen's Own and Royal Irish)
- (United Kingdom) 1996–1999: Royal Honorary Colonel of the King's Own Yorkshire Yeomanry (Light Infantry)
- (United Kingdom) 1949–1994: Commandant-in-Chief of the Women's Royal Air Force
- (United Kingdom) 1960 – 30 March 2002: Commandant-in-Chief of the RAF Central Flying School
- (United Kingdom) 1994 – 30 March 2002: Commandant-in-Chief, Women, Royal Air Force
- (United Kingdom) unk. – 30 March 2002: Air Chief Commandant of the Women's Royal Auxiliary Air Force
- (United Kingdom) 1949–1957 and 1999 – 30 March 2002: Honorary Air Commodore of No. 600 Squadron RAF
- (United Kingdom) unk. – 11 January 1994: Commandant-in-Chief of the Women's Royal Naval Service
- (United Kingdom) 11 January 1994 – 30 March 2002: Commandant-in-Chief for Women in the Royal Navy

== Non-national titles and honours ==
=== Freedom of the City ===
- (Scotland) 1927: Glasgow
- (Scotland) 29 August 1928: Stirling
- (Scotland) 1928: Dunfermline
- (Scotland) 1935: Perth
- (Scotland) 1936: Edinburgh
- (Scotland) 1953: Inverness – Joint Freedom with the Queen's Own Cameron Highlanders
- (England) 1953: London
- (England) 26 July 1954: King's Lynn and West Norfolk
- (Scotland) 1954: Dundee – Also on Behalf of the Black Watch
- (Canada) 1954: Ottawa
- (Scotland) 1956: Forfar – Also on Behalf of the Black Watch
- (Scotland) 1956: Musselburgh
- (Scotland) 1956: Wick
- (Scotland) 25 May 1959: Aberdeen
- (England) 13 April 1961: St Albans
- (England) 1981: Windsor and Maidenhead
- (Scotland) 1990: Caithness
- (Russia) 2000: Volgograd (Honorary Citizen)

=== Memberships and fellowships ===
Country	Date	Organisation	Position
United Kingdom	December 1938 – 2002	Women's Royal Voluntary Service	President
United Kingdom	1956–2002	Royal Society	Honorary Fellow (FRS)
United Kingdom		Royal Society of Edinburgh	Honorary Fellow (FRSE)
United Kingdom		London School of Economics	Honorary Fellow
United Kingdom	1944–2002	Honourable Society of the Middle Temple	Honorary Bencher
United Kingdom		Royal College of Physicians	Honorary Fellow
United Kingdom		Royal College of Physicians of Edinburgh	Honorary Fellow
United Kingdom		Royal College of Surgeons of England	Patron
United Kingdom		Royal Academy of Dramatic Art	Patron
United Kingdom		Royal Academy of Music	Patron
United Kingdom		Marie Curie Memorial Foundation	Patron
United Kingdom		Royal Air Force Club	Honorary Life Member
United Kingdom		Royal College of Midwives	Patron
United Kingdom		Royal College of Music	President Emerita
United Kingdom		Royal College of Nursing	Patron
United Kingdom		Royal College of Surgeons of England	Patron
United Kingdom		Royal Commonwealth Society	Patron
United Kingdom		Royal British Legion (Women's Section)	President
United Kingdom		Royal British Legion Scotland (Women's Section)	Grand President
United Kingdom		Royal School of Church Music	Patron
United Kingdom		Royal Society of Musicians	Patron
United Kingdom		Royal Automobile Club	Honorary Member
United Kingdom		Royal Household Cricket Club	Patron
United Kingdom		Royal School of Needlework	Patron
United Kingdom		Royal Horticultural Society	Patron
United Kingdom		Royal National Lifeboat Institution	Patron
United Kingdom		Royal Society for the Prevention of Cruelty to Animals	Patron
United Kingdom		Royal Scottish Society of Arts	Patron
United Kingdom		Scottish National Institution for the War Blinded	Patron
United Kingdom		Special Forces Club	Patron
United Kingdom		Cavalry and Guards Club	Lady Patron
United Kingdom		Society of Antiquaries of London	Royal Fellow (FSA)
Canada		Victorian Order of Nurses	Patron
Canada		Ontario Jockey Club	Patron
Canada	28 June 1974 – 30 March 2002	Law Society of Upper Canada	Honorary Bencher
(United Kingdom) British Empire and Commonwealth	1983–2002	Victoria Cross and George Cross Association	President
(United Kingdom) British Empire and Commonwealth		Gallantry Medallists' League	Patron

=== Scholastic ===
Chancellor, president, visitor, governor, and fellowships
Country	Date	Institution	Position
United Kingdom	1953–1993	Royal College of Music	President
United Kingdom	1955–1980	University of London	Chancellor
United Kingdom	1967–1977	University of Dundee	Chancellor
United Kingdom	1981–2002	Royal Holloway College	Patron
United Kingdom		London School of Economics	Honorary Fellow
Canada	1974–2002	Law Society of Upper Canada	Honorary Bencher

Honorary degrees
Country	Date	Institution	Degree
United Kingdom	1924	Queen's University Belfast	Doctor of Laws (LLD)
United Kingdom	1929	University of St. Andrews	Doctor of Laws (LLD)
United Kingdom	1932	University of Glasgow	Doctor of Laws (LLD)
United Kingdom	1937	University of Edinburgh	Doctor of Laws (LLD)
South Africa	1947	University of Cape Town	Doctor of Laws (LLD)
United Kingdom	1948	University of Cambridge	Doctor of Laws (LLD)
United Kingdom	1951	Victoria University of Manchester	Doctor of Laws (LLD)
United Kingdom	1954	University of Leeds	Doctor of Laws (LLD)
United States	1954	Columbia University	Doctor of Laws (LLD)
Australia	1958	University of Melbourne	Doctor of Laws (LLD)
New Zealand	1966	University of Auckland	Doctor of Laws (LLD)
Canada	1967	Dalhousie University	Doctor of Laws (LLD)
Zimbabwe	1981	University of Zimbabwe	Doctor of Laws (LLD)
United Kingdom	1983	University of Aberdeen	Doctor of Laws (LLD)
United Kingdom	1931	University of Oxford	Doctor of Civil Law (DCL)
United Kingdom	1967	University of Dundee	Doctor of Civil Law (DCL)
United Kingdom	1984	Newcastle University	Doctor of Civil Law (DCL)
United Kingdom	1966	University of Sheffield	Doctor of Music (DMus)
United Kingdom	5 December 1973	Royal College of Music	Doctor of Music (DMus)
United Kingdom	1994	Royal Scottish Academy of Music & Drama	Doctor of Music (DMus)
United Kingdom	1937	University of London	Doctor of Letters (DLitt)
Jamaica	1965	University of the West Indies	Doctor of Letters (DLitt)
United Kingdom	1965	University of Keele	Doctor of Letters (DLitt)
United Kingdom	1991	Royal Veterinary College	Doctor of Veterinary Medicine (DVM)

=== Other ===
Country	Date	Position
Scotland	1970–2002	Chieftain of the Mey Highland Games

== Honorific eponyms ==
=== Structures ===
==== Buildings ====
- United Kingdom
  - England: Bowes-Lyon Youth Centre, Stevenage
  - England: Queen Elizabeth Hospital, Birmingham
  - England: Queen Mother Theatre, Hitchin
  - England: Queen Elizabeth Hospital, King's Lynn
  - England: Queen Elizabeth The Queen Mother Hospital, Margate
  - England: Lyon Court, part of Queens' College, Cambridge.
  - Scotland: Queen Mother Building, University of Dundee, Dundee
  - Scotland: Queen Mother Library, University of Aberdeen, Aberdeen
  - Scotland: Queen Elizabeth Wing, Stirling Royal Infirmary, Stirling

==== Schools ====
- Canada:
  - Nova Scotia: Queen Elizabeth High School, Halifax
- United Kingdom
  - Wales: Queen Elizabeth High School, Carmarthen
  - England: Queen Elizabeth House, University of Oxford, Oxford
- Zimbabwe: Queen Elizabeth School, Harare

==== Ships ====
- United Kingdom: RMS Queen Elizabeth

== See also ==
- List of titles and honours of George VI
- List of titles and honours of Elizabeth II
- List of titles and honours of Prince Philip, Duke of Edinburgh
- List of titles and honours of Charles III
- List of titles and honours of Queen Camilla
- List of titles and honours of William, Prince of Wales
- List of titles and honours of Catherine, Princess of Wales
- List of titles and honours of Anne, Princess Royal
- List of titles and honours of Prince Edward, Duke of Edinburgh
- List of titles and honours of George V
- List of titles and honours of Mary of Teck
- List of titles and honours of Edward VIII
- List of titles and honours of Prince Arthur, Duke of Connaught and Strathearn
