= Princess Victoria of the United Kingdom =

British princess (1868–1935)

Princess Victoria
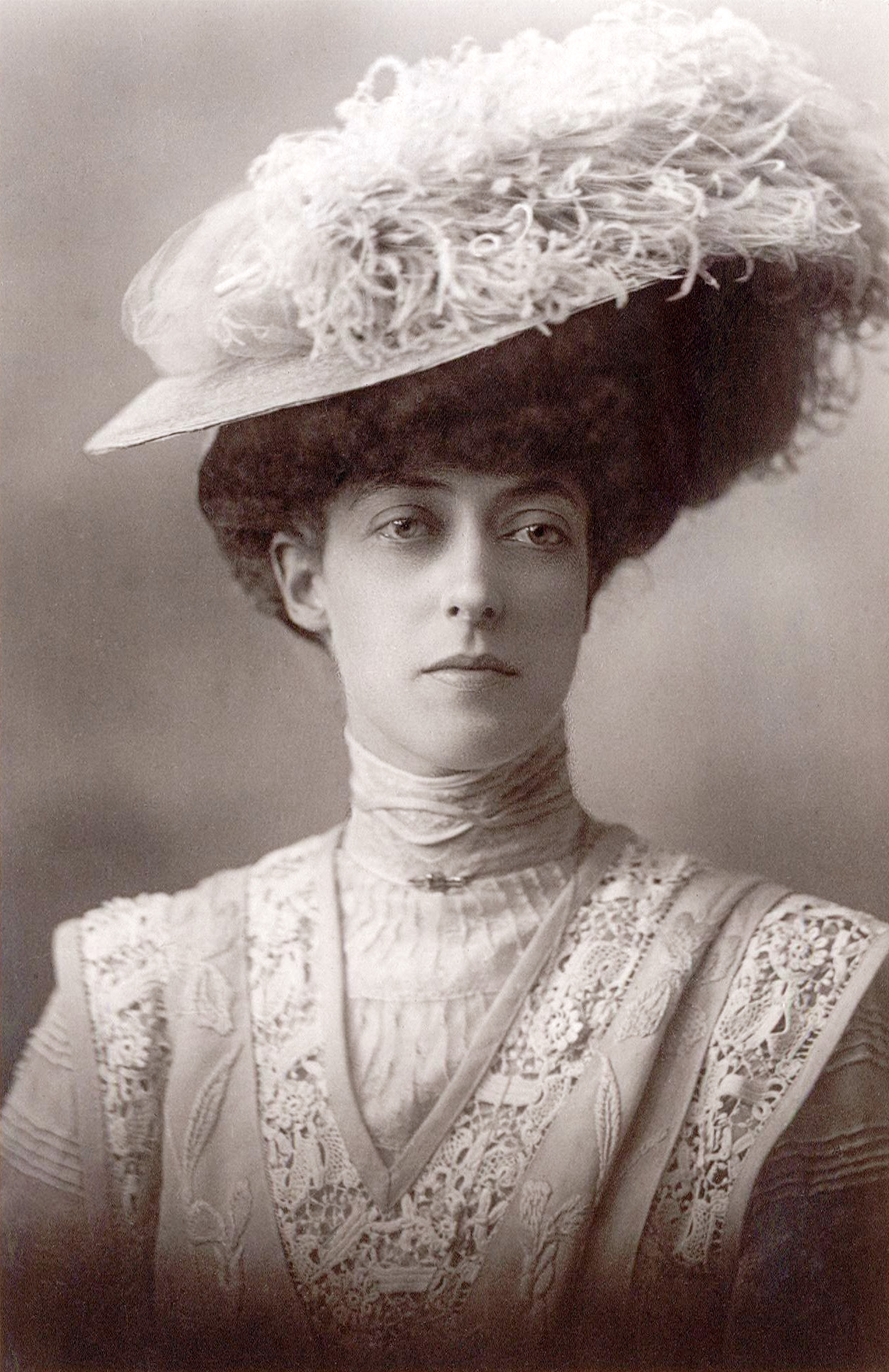
- Portrait by W. & D. Downey, c. 1890
- Born: Princess Victoria of Wales; 6 July 1868; Marlborough House, London, England
- Died: 3 December 1935 (aged 67); Coppins, Iver, Buckinghamshire, England
- Burial: 7 December 1935; St George's Chapel, Windsor Castle; 8 January 1936; Royal Burial Ground, Frogmore
Names
- Victoria Alexandra Olga Mary
- House: Windsor (from 1917); Saxe-Coburg and Gotha (until 1917)
- Father: Edward VII
- Mother: Alexandra of Denmark

Princess Victoria (Victoria Alexandra Olga Mary; 6 July 1868 – 3 December 1935) was the fourth child and second daughter of King Edward VII and Queen Alexandra and the younger sister of King George V.

Victoria never married or had children, remaining particularly close to her parents and especially to her mother, whom she accompanied on royal engagements and visits. She had a particular passion for photography and compiled 40 albums documenting her family and other European royal families, and her photographic work has since been featured in exhibitions held by the Royal Collection. She was also deeply interested in music and was a keen amateur pianist, maintaining close friendships with several musicians. She took a keen interest in gardening, animals, and village life. Following her mother's death in 1925, Victoria moved to Coppins in Buckinghamshire, where she lived a comparatively private life until her death in 1935, aged 67.

== Early life and education ==
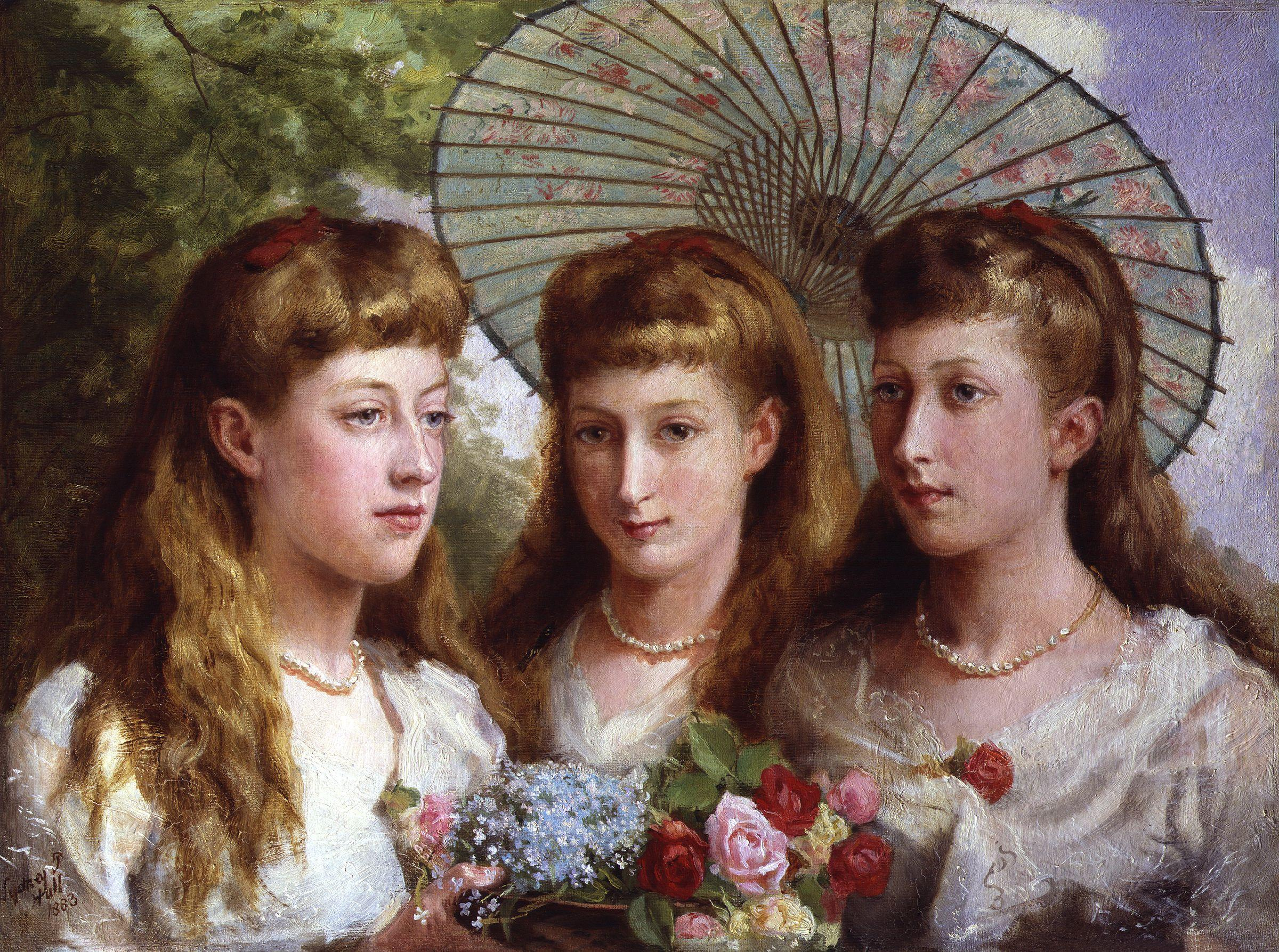
Princess Victoria of Wales (left) as a teenager, together with her sisters Maud (centre) and Louise (right)

Victoria was born on 6 July 1868 at Marlborough House, London. She was the fourth child of Albert Edward, Prince of Wales, and his wife Alexandra, Princess of Wales. Victoria's father was the eldest son of Queen Victoria and Prince Albert. Her mother was the eldest daughter of King Christian IX and Queen Louise of Denmark. Among those close to her, the princess was known as Toria. From birth, as the granddaughter of the British monarch, she had the title Her Royal Highness Princess Victoria of Wales.

Victoria was baptised at Marlborough House on 6 August by Archibald Campbell Tait, Bishop of London. (Note: Her godparents were: her paternal grandmother Queen Victoria (for whom the Duchess of Cambridge stood proxy), Tsar Alexander II of Russia (for whom the Russian ambassador Philipp, Count Brunnow, stood proxy), the Tsarevich of Russia (her maternal uncle-by-marriage), Prince Arthur (her paternal uncle), Prince Louis of Hesse and by Rhine (her paternal uncle-by-marriage), Prince George of Hesse-Cassel (her maternal great-granduncle), her maternal aunt-by-marriage, Queen Olga of Greece (for whom the Grand Duchess of Mecklenburg-Strelitz stood proxy), the Dowager Queen of Denmark, the Dowager Grand Duchess of Mecklenburg-Strelitz, the Queen's cousin Princess Francis of Teck and Princess Frederick of Anhalt.)

== Personal life ==
In 1885, Victoria was a bridesmaid at the wedding of her aunt Princess Beatrice to Prince Henry of Battenberg. She was also a bridesmaid at the wedding of her brother George, Duke of York and Victoria Mary of Teck, the future King and Queen of the United Kingdom.

Victoria was educated at home with her sisters. She grew up at Marlborough House and Sandringham under the supervision of tutors. She occasionally spent the summer in Denmark, her mother's homeland. In her youth, she was described as "a lively, mischievous girl ... smart, tall and elegant; she had a wonderful sense of humour and was a good friend to everyone; she had big expressive blue eyes; there was no pretense or hint of a high position in her." Victoria loved horse riding, cycling, reading, listening to music and dancing. Victoria's particular passion was photography. She compiled several albums of family photographs. Her works have been displayed at several different exhibitions. She was very fond of animals. Her favourites were dogs named Sam, Mas and Punchy. For six years Victoria had a tamed pigeon, which she took with her on walks and travels in a small basket.

Victoria maintained friendly relations with her cousins in Russia and Greece. The future Emperor Nicholas II of Russia, who was her first cousin (her mother's sister's son), and exactly the same age, was in love with her in his youth. The Tsarevich liked Victoria for her seriousness, thoroughness, and "unfeminine mind." In 1889, describing Victoria, Nicholas told his close friend and brother-in-law, Grand Duke Alexander Mikhailovich: "She is a truly wonderful creature, and the more and deeper you delve into her soul, the clearer you see all her virtues and qualities. I must confess that it is very difficult to figure it out at first, i.e. to learn her view of things and people, but this difficulty is a special charm for me, which I am unable to explain." She also caught the eye of Grand Duke Alexander Mikhailovich.

Another candidate to seek Victoria's hand in marriage was her cousin, Crown Prince Christian of Denmark, who later became Christian X. She rejected him, much to the disappointment of her parents. Yet another contender for marriage was the Portuguese king Carlos I. He demanded that Victoria accept the Catholic faith, which did not sit well with her parents. The 5th Earl of Rosebery also attempted to win her attention, in vain. Victoria never married, and her mother was said to be supportive of this decision.

Victoria was particularly close to her parents, and if she appeared in public, it was usually in their company, as was usual in those days for an unmarried adult woman. She accompanied her parents during official events and ceremonies, and helped them in private life. Her first cousin, the Grand Duchess Olga Alexandrovna of Russia, remarked in later life that she "felt so very sorry" for Victoria, as she seemed within her family to be "a glorified maid to her mother," attributing her staying unmarried to a disinclination to oppose her mother. "I'd something of a rebel in me. Toria had not."

Close as she was to her parents, the person to whom Victoria was closest was her older brother George, who in 1910 became king and emperor. Throughout their lives, which ended within a month of each other, the king-emperor and his sister maintained a warm relationship. They had similar characters and a mutual sense of humour. When Victoria died in 1935, the king said: "How I will miss our daily phone calls. Nobody had such a sister as I had." The king died a month after the death of his sister. She was not close to his wife, Queen Mary, née Princess Victoria Mary of Teck, whom she described as "terribly boring". This was attributed to their different characters, education and interests.

== Later years and death ==
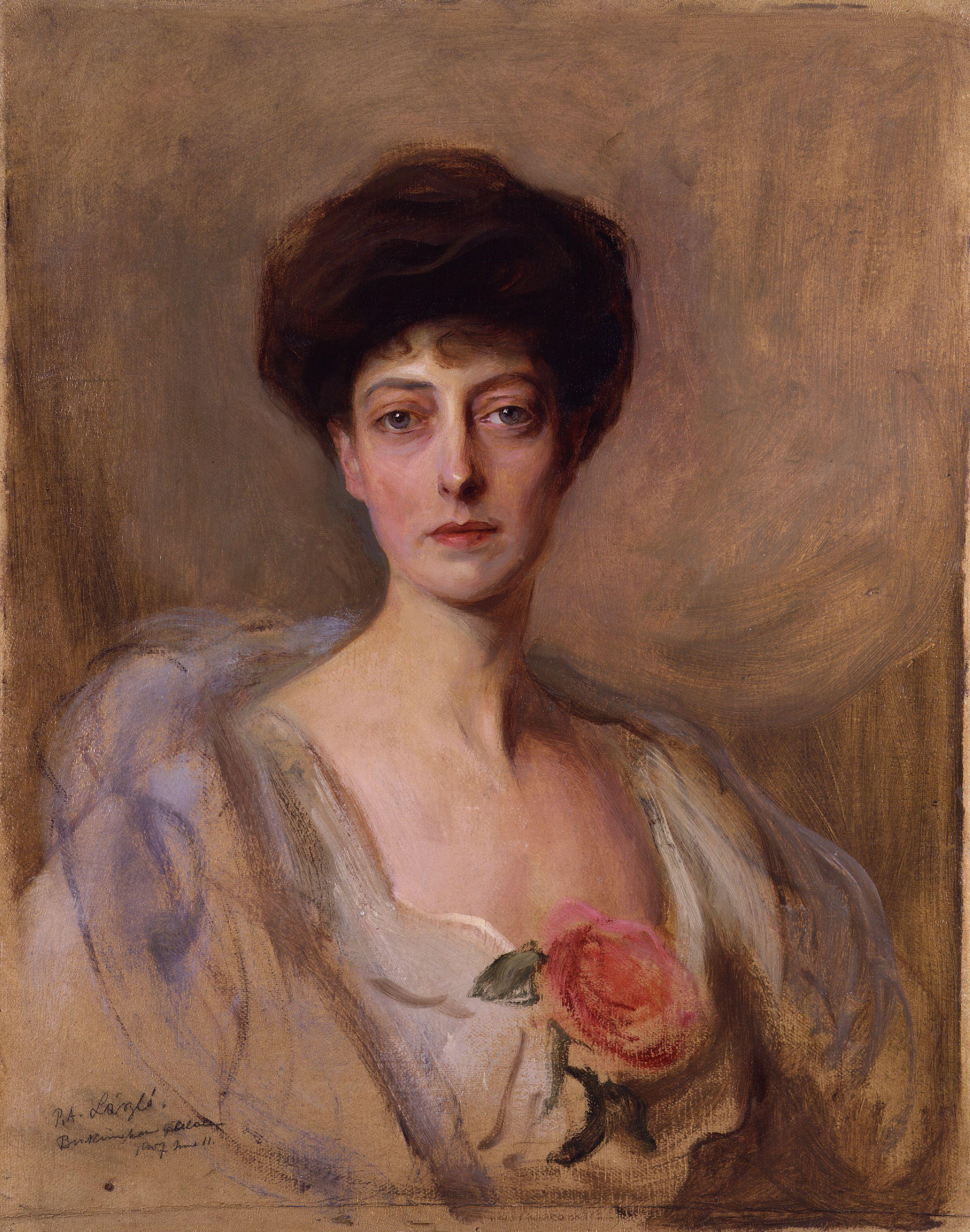
Portrait by Philip de László, 1907

Between 22 and 24 March 1905, Victoria, along with her mother, her younger sister Maud (future Queen Maud of Norway) and her cousin / brother-in-law Carl (future Haakon VII, King of Norway), made an official visit to Portugal on the royal yacht HMY Victoria and Albert following a visit by the Portuguese monarch to the United Kingdom a year prior. On the first day of her arrival, Victoria stayed on the royal yacht due to poor health. Queen Alexandra with her daughter Princess Maud and Prince Carl met with Queen Amelia and Queen Dowager Maria Pia. The next day, accompanied by her sister, Victoria paid a visit to the king, queen and their sons. On 24 March the British guests left for their homeland.

After her father's death in 1910, Victoria remained in the shadow of her mother. Queen Alexandra suffered from constant depression and was practically deaf. Victoria accompanied her mother during her visits to various institutions and on holidays. Once, when the dowager queen was unable to attend the charity event Alexandra Rose Day, she sent her daughters Louise and Victoria together, and the latter later recorded in her diary that "it was terrible to be there without dear Mama." With continuing public hostility toward Germany during World War I, King George V decided to renounce all German titles and honours. He asked all members of the royal family to do the same. The king renamed the ruling dynasty from Saxe-Coburg and Gotha to Windsor, after his favourite castle. Victoria followed suit and adopted the surname Windsor.

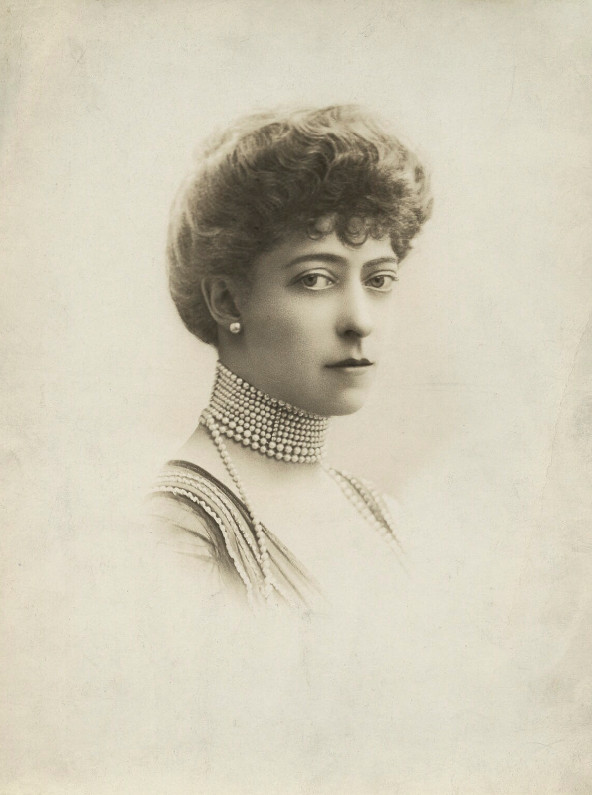
Victoria, c. 1917

After the death of Queen Alexandra in 1925, Victoria moved to Coppins, in the village of Iver, Buckinghamshire, where she lived until her death. In her final years, Victoria enjoyed listening to music, gardening, and taking an active part in addressing local issues and problems. Victoria became a patron to the young cellist Beatrice Harrison and her sisters May and Margaret, who also studied music, and she paid for Harrison's valuable Guarneri cello. Victoria received the Harrison sisters regularly at her home and at Sandringham, and attended concerts at the Wigmore Hall with them. She also commissioned His Master's Voice to make her some private recordings in August 1928: the recordings, capturing Victoria at the piano accompanying Beatrice Harrison on the cello and May Harrison on the violin, would many years later be commercially released, though Victoria's musicianship would generate mixed reviews.

Other friends of Victoria included members of the Musgrave family, the widowed 5th Earl of Rosebery, and Violet Vivian, a former lady-in-waiting to Queen Alexandra. Lady Musgrave was Victoria's lifelong friend and lady-in-waiting. Victoria assisted Violet Vivian in the design of the Cestyll Garden near the village of Cemaes on the northwest coast of Anglesey.

Victoria died in the early hours of 3 December 1935 at the age of 67 at her home. She had been in poor health over the previous month, culminating in a severe stomach haemorrhage on 1 December. The State Opening of Parliament, planned for 3 December, was cancelled in response to her death, and instead the already-written King's Speech was read to Parliamentarians by the Lord Chancellor without ceremony.

Her funeral took place on 7 December 1935 at St George's Chapel, Windsor Castle, where she was initially buried. The mourners at the funeral included Victoria's brother George V. George himself was in poor health, and his doctor pushed for the funeral service to be shortened; he was unsuccessful, and George's final deterioration and death soon after would later be blamed on the physical strain of the long event. Victoria's remains were later moved and reburied at the Royal Burial Ground, Frogmore, Windsor Great Park, on 8 January 1936. Her will was sealed in London in 1936. Her estate was valued at £237,455 (or £11.7 million in 2022 when adjusted for inflation).

== Titles, styles, honours and arms ==
=== Titles and styles ===
- 6 July 1868 – 22 January 1901: Her Royal Highness Princess Victoria of Wales
- 22 January 1901 – 3 December 1935: Her Royal Highness The Princess Victoria

=== Honours ===
- Imperial Order of the Crown of India, 6 August 1887
- Dame Grand Cross of the Order of the Hospital of St. John of Jerusalem
- Member First Class of the Royal Order of Victoria and Albert
- Royal Family Order of King Edward VII
- Royal Family Order of Queen Alexandra
- Royal Family Order of King George V

=== Arms ===
Upon her younger sister's marriage in 1896, Princess Victoria was awarded a personal coat of arms, being the Royal Arms of the United Kingdom, bearing an inescutcheon of the shield of Saxony and differenced with a label argent of five points, the first, third and fifth bearing roses gules, and the second and fourth crosses gules. The inescutcheon was dropped by royal warrant in 1917.

Princess Victoria's coat of arms until 1917

== Ancestors ==
Ancestors of Princess Victoria of the United Kingdom

8. Ernest I, Duke of Saxe-Coburg and Gotha
4. Prince Albert of Saxe-Coburg and Gotha
9. Princess Louise of Saxe-Gotha-Altenburg
2. Edward VII of the United Kingdom
10. Prince Edward, Duke of Kent and Strathearn
5. Queen Victoria of the United Kingdom
11. Princess Victoria of Saxe-Coburg-Saalfeld
1. Princess Victoria of the United Kingdom
12. Frederick William, Duke of Schleswig-Holstein-Sonderburg-Glücksburg
6. Christian IX of Denmark
13. Princess Louise Caroline of Hesse-Kassel
3. Princess Alexandra of Denmark
14. Prince William of Hesse-Kassel
7. Princess Louise of Hesse-Kassel
15. Princess Charlotte of Denmark
