= Royal Family Order of Charles III =

British honour

- Insignia

Awarded by King Charles III
- Type: Royal Family Order
- Founded: 2024
- Country: United Kingdom
- Ribbon: Pale blue
- Eligibility: Female members of the British royal family
- Criteria: At His Majesty's pleasure
- Status: Active

Statistics
- First induction: 2024
- Ribbon of the Order

The Royal Family Order of Charles III is an honour that is bestowed on female members of the British royal family by King Charles III. The order is worn by recipients on formal occasions.

== Appearance ==
The Royal Family Order depicts the King wearing the ceremonial day uniform of a Royal Navy Admiral of the Fleet with the collar of the Order of the Garter, the Royal Victorian Chain, the riband of the Royal Victorian Order, the badges of the Order of the Bath and Order of Merit and medals.

The miniature, painted by Elizabeth Meek based on a photograph by Hugo Burnand, is in oil on polymin, a synthetic replacement for the ivory used in previous royal family orders. The miniature is bordered by loose diamonds from the royal collection and surmounted by a Tudor Crown in diamonds and enamel in a yellow-gold frame. The enamelwork was done by Fiona Rae, a jeweller who began her business with a loan from the Prince's Trust. The reverse depicts the King's cypher in gold. The goldwork was engineered by Seth Kennedy, a scholar from the Queen Elizabeth Scholarship Trust. The watered silk ribbon is pale blue, is formed into a bow and is made by Philip Treacy; the colour of the ribbon is based on that of George V.

It was worn for the first time by Queen Camilla at a state banquet in honour of Emperor Naruhito, and his wife, of Japan on 25 June 2024. It is worn pinned to the dress of the recipient on the left shoulder.

== List of known recipients ==
- June 2024:
  - The Queen, the King's wife
- December 2024:
  - The Princess Royal, the King's sister
  - The Duchess of Edinburgh, the King's sister-in-law
  - The Duchess of Gloucester, wife of the King's first cousin once removed
- July 2025:
  - The Princess of Wales, the King's daughter-in-law

== Gallery ==
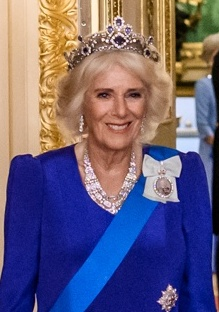
Queen Camilla wearing her order, 2025

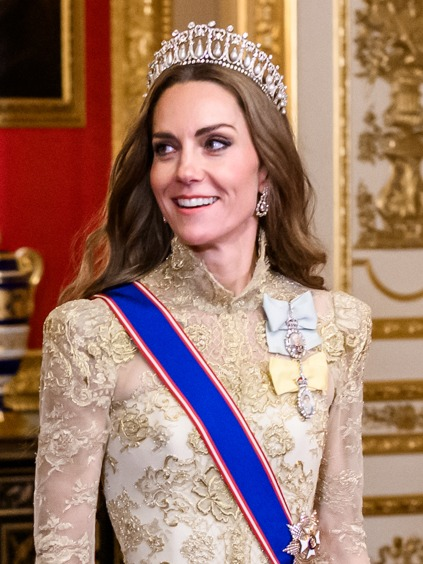
The Princess of Wales wearing her orders, 2025

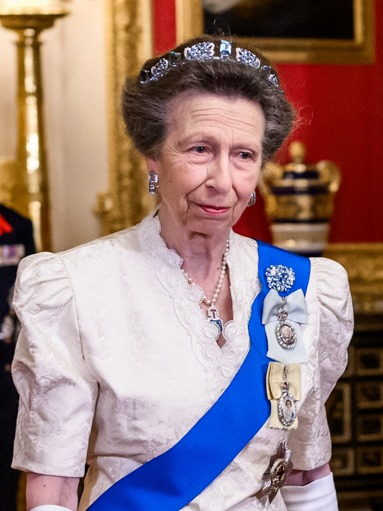
The Princess Royal wearing her orders, 2025

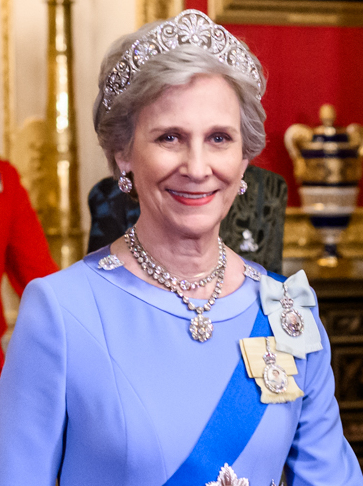
The Duchess of Gloucester wearing her orders, 2025

== See also ==
- Royal family order
- Royal family orders of the United Kingdom
- Royal Family Order of George IV
- Royal Order of Victoria and Albert
- Royal Family Order of Edward VII
- Royal Family Order of George V
- Royal Family Order of George VI
- Royal Family Order of Elizabeth II
