= Royal Family Order of Elizabeth II =

British honour

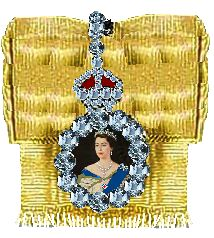
- Insignia

Awarded by Queen Elizabeth II
- Type: Royal Family Order
- Founded: 1952
- Country: United Kingdom
- Ribbon: Chartreuse yellow
- Eligibility: Female members of the British royal family
- Criteria: At Her Majesty's pleasure
- Status: Not awarded since the death of Elizabeth II

Statistics
- First induction: 1952
- Last induction: 2017
- Ribbon of the Order

The Royal Family Order of Elizabeth II is an honour which was bestowed on female members of the British royal family by Queen Elizabeth II. The order is worn by recipients on formal occasions.

== Appearance ==
The Royal Family Order depicts a young Queen Elizabeth II in evening dress wearing the ribbon and star of the Order of the Garter. The miniature, painted on ivory (glass since 2017), is bordered by diamonds and surmounted by a Tudor Crown in diamonds and red enamel. The reverse, in silver-gilt, is patterned with rays and depicts the royal cypher and St Edward's Crown in gold and enamel. The watered silk ribbon is chartreuse yellow and formed into a bow. It is worn pinned to the dress of the recipient on the left shoulder.

It was provided in two different sizes: the larger version was bestowed on the Queen's mother, grandmother and sister, and size two to the other recipients. (After the death of Queen Mary, Princess Margaret began wearing her grandmother's size 1 badge.)

== List of known recipients ==
The initial badges were presented at Christmas 1952.

=== Deceased ===
Size 1:

- 1952: Queen Elizabeth the Queen Mother (mother of Elizabeth II)
- 1952: Queen Mary (grandmother of Elizabeth II)
- 1952: Princess Margaret, Countess of Snowdon (younger sister of Elizabeth II)
- 1981: Diana, Princess of Wales (daughter-in-law of Elizabeth II)

Size 2:

- 1952: Mary, Princess Royal and Countess of Harewood (aunt of Elizabeth II)
- 1952: Princess Alice, Duchess of Gloucester (aunt of Elizabeth II)
- 1952: Princess Marina, Duchess of Kent (aunt of Elizabeth II)
- 1952: Princess Alice, Countess of Athlone (grandaunt and first cousin twice removed of Elizabeth II)
- 1961: Katharine, Duchess of Kent (wife of Elizabeth II's first cousin)

=== Living ===
- 1952: Princess Alexandra, The Hon. Lady Ogilvy (first cousin of Elizabeth II)
- 1969: Anne, Princess Royal (daughter of Elizabeth II)
- 1973: Birgitte, Duchess of Gloucester (wife of Elizabeth II's first cousin)
- 2004: Sophie, Duchess of Edinburgh (daughter-in-law of Elizabeth II)
- 2007: Queen Camilla (daughter-in-law of Elizabeth II)
- 2017: Catherine, Princess of Wales (granddaughter-in-law of Elizabeth II)

== Gallery ==
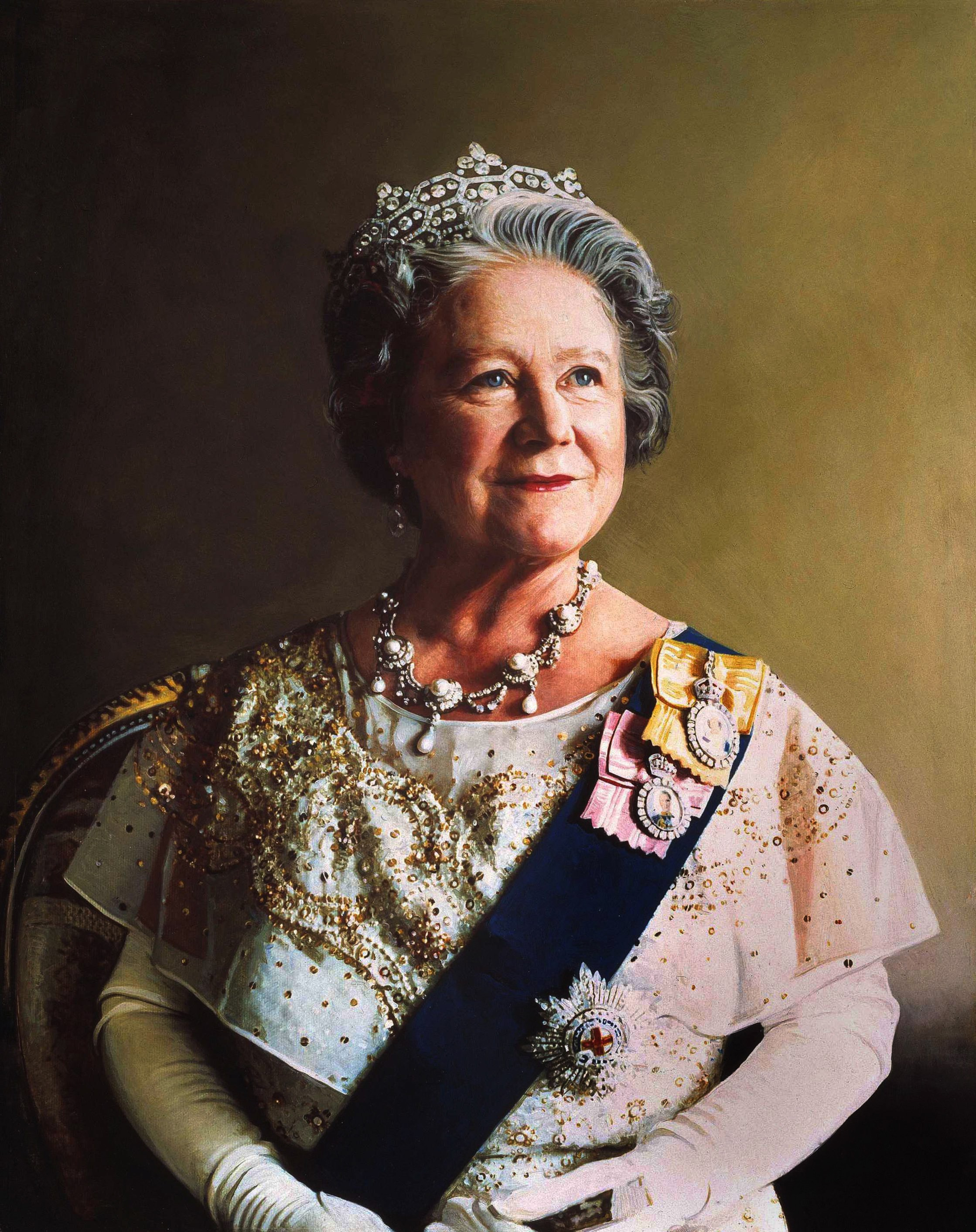
Queen Elizabeth the Queen Mother wearing her orders

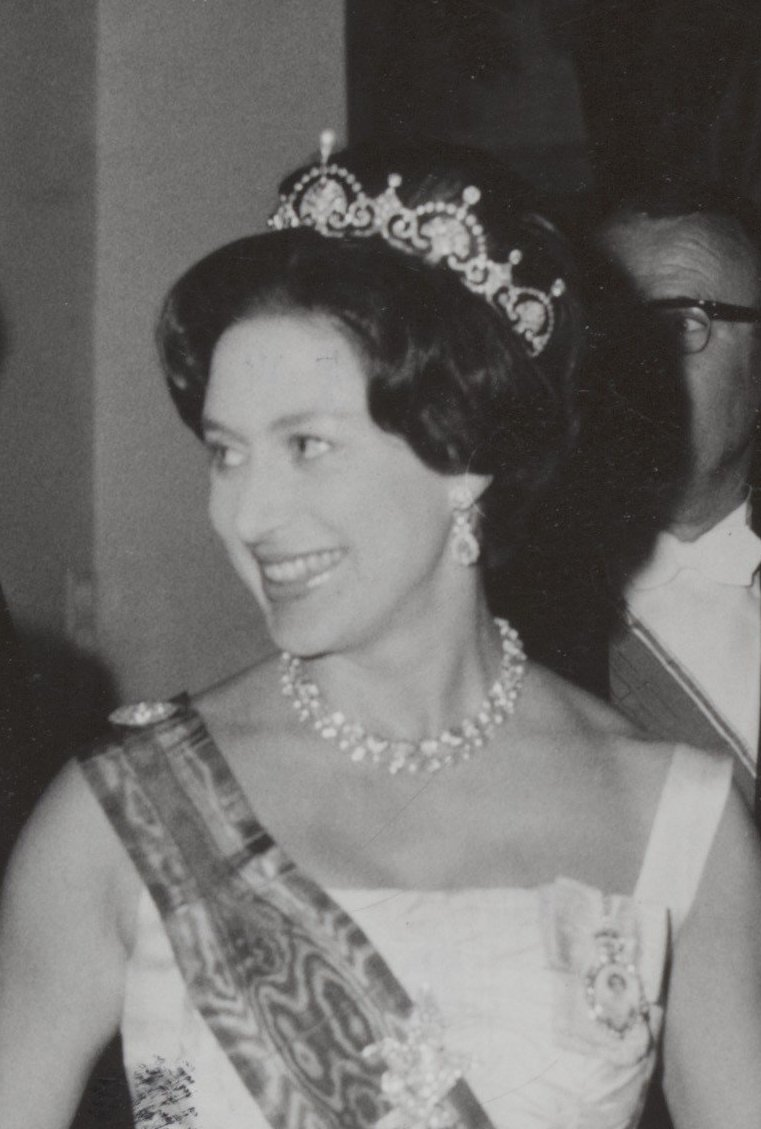
Princess Margaret wearing her order

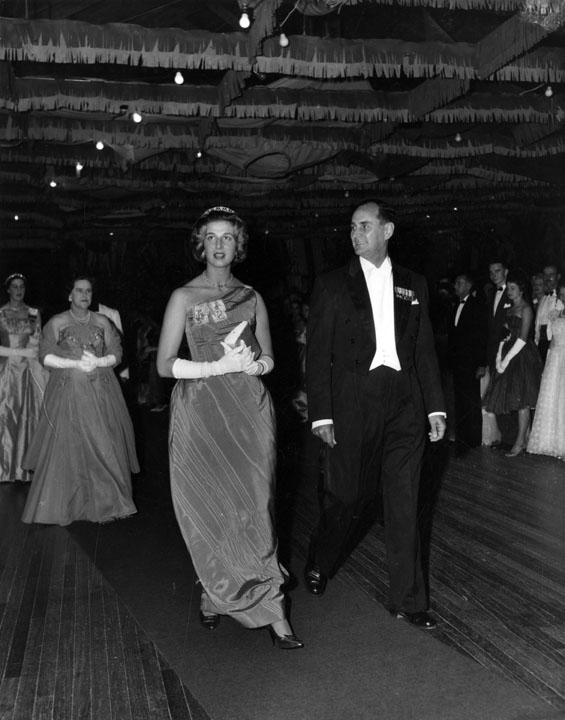
Princess Alexandra wearing her orders

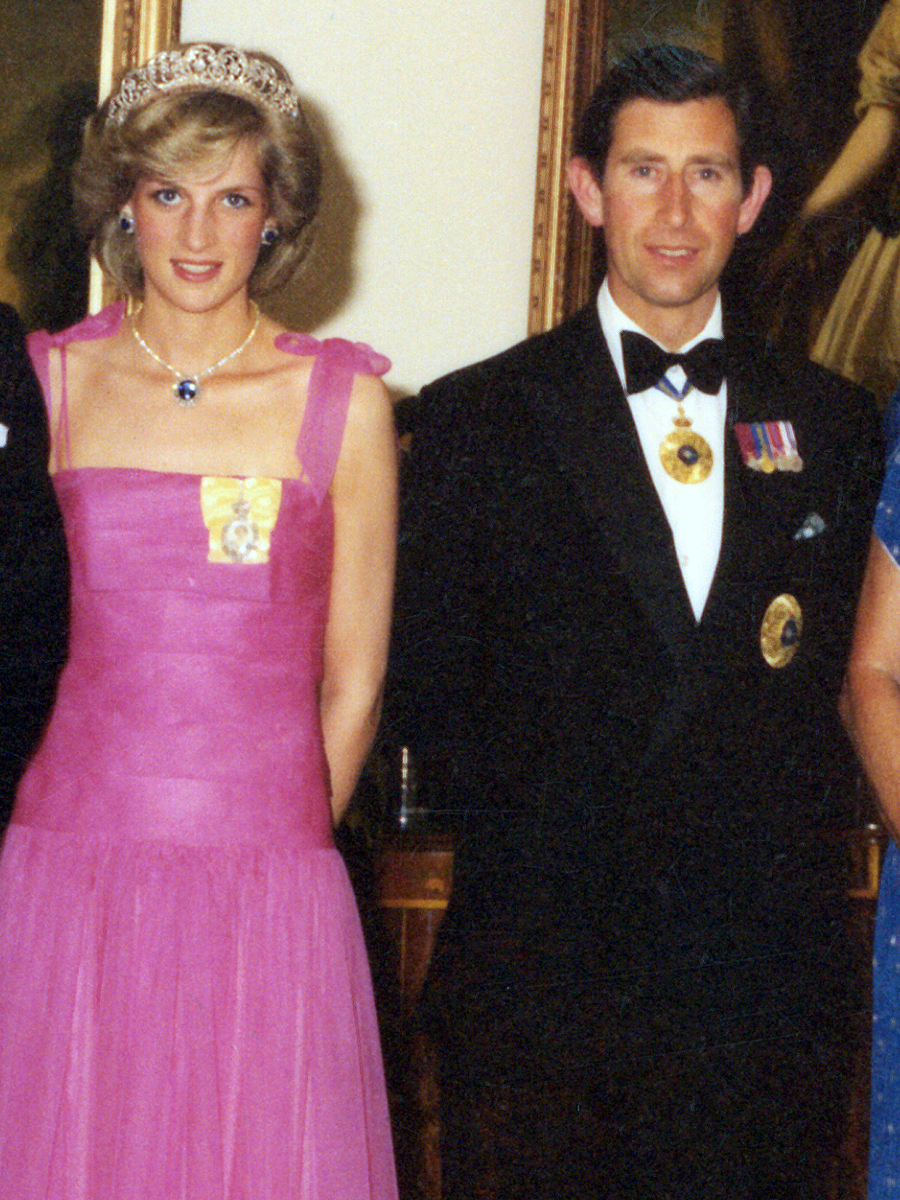
Diana, Princess of Wales wearing her order

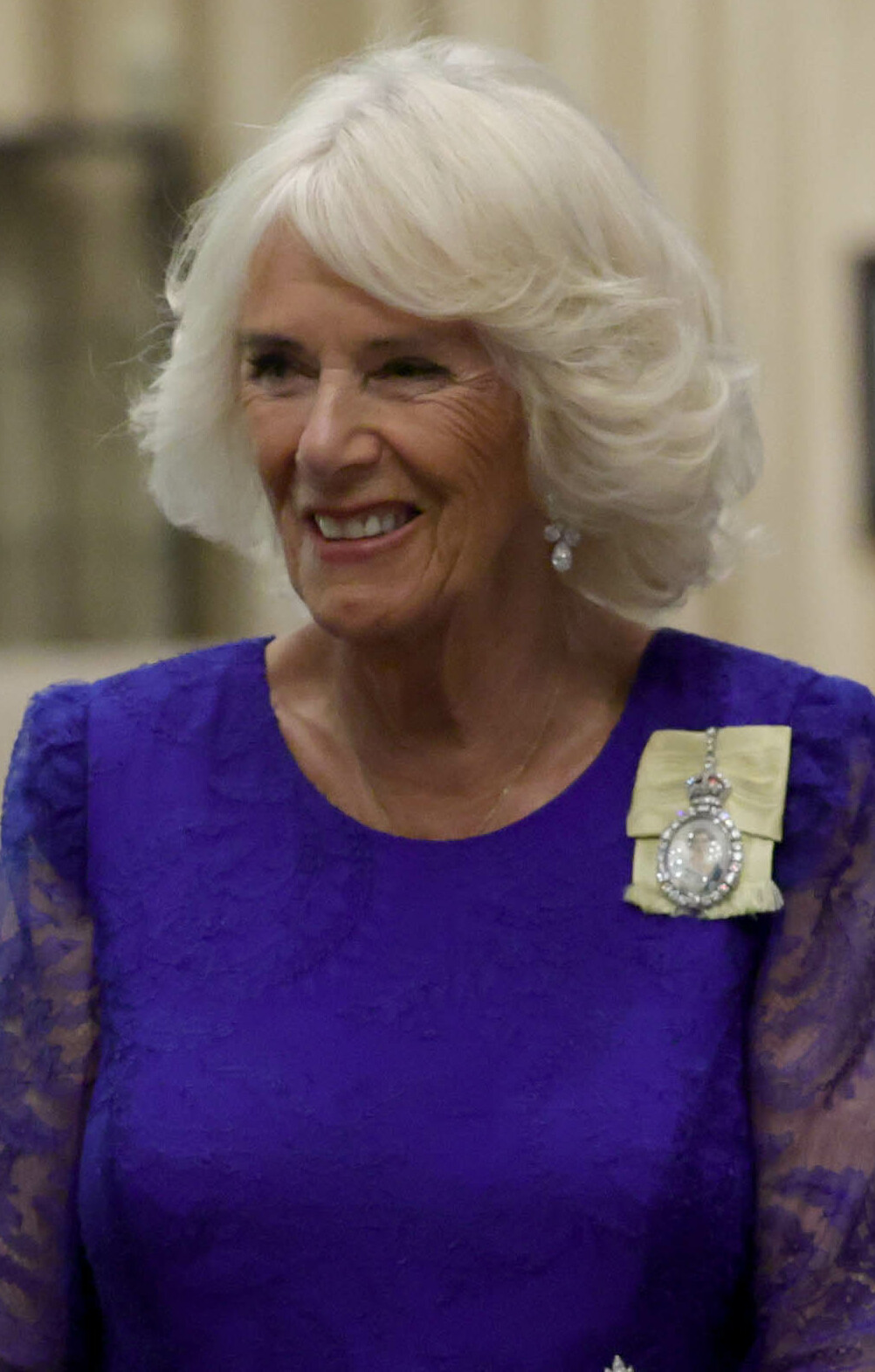
Queen Camilla wearing her order

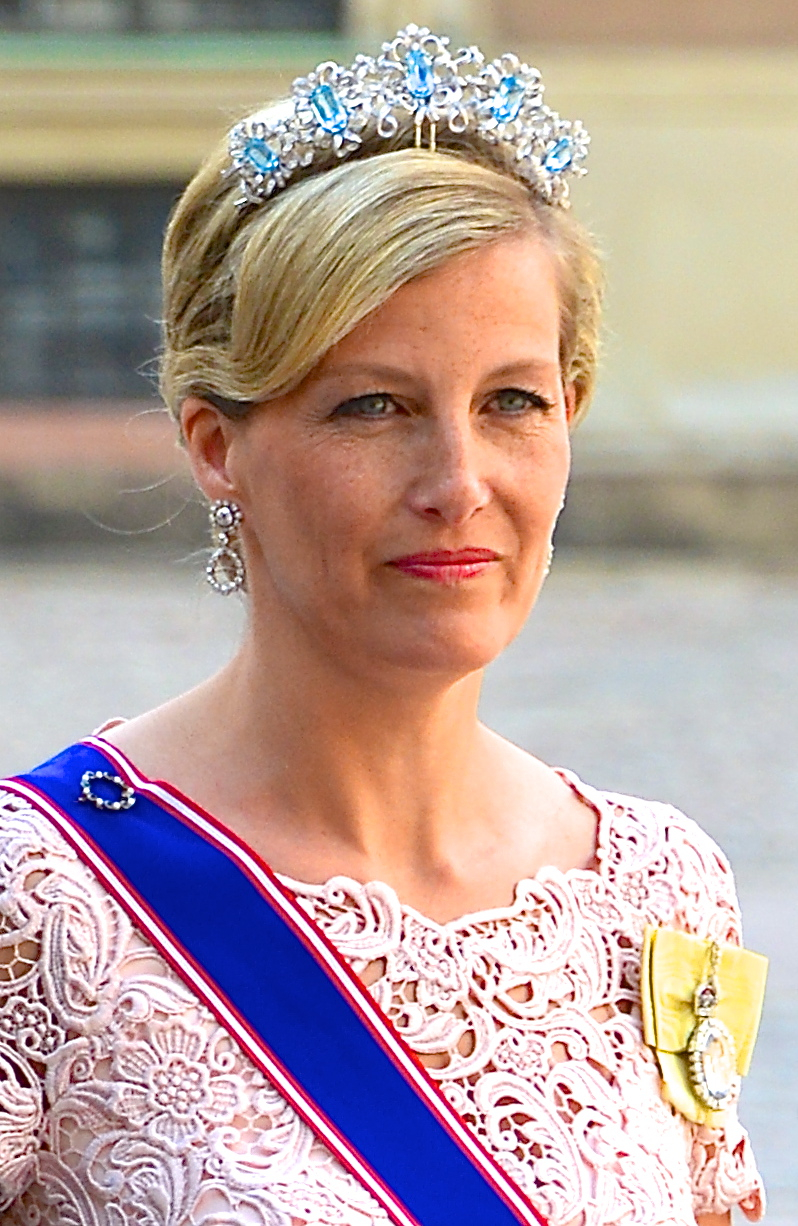
The Duchess of Edinburgh wearing her order

== See also ==
- Royal family order
- Royal family orders of the United Kingdom
- Royal Family Order of George IV
- Royal Order of Victoria and Albert
- Royal Family Order of Edward VII
- Royal Family Order of George V
- Royal Family Order of George VI
- Royal Family Order of Charles III
