= Royal Family Order of Edward VII =

British honour

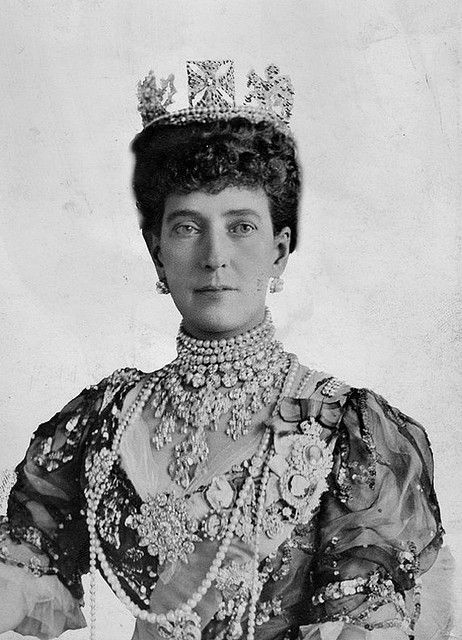
- Queen Alexandra wearing the Royal Family Order of Edward VII

Awarded by King Edward VII
- Type: Royal Family Order
- Country: United Kingdom
- Eligibility: Female members of the British royal family
- Criteria: At His Majesty's pleasure
- Status: Defunct; Not awarded since the death of Edward VII

Statistics
- First induction: 1901
- Ribbon of the Order

The Royal Family Order of Edward VII is an honour that was bestowed as a mark of personal esteem on female members of the British royal family by King Edward VII. The order is a personal memento rather than a state decoration.

== Appearance ==
The ribbon of Edward VII's royal family order is based on his racing colours. They are (working outwards in) a red stripe, almost half the size of the centre stripe, a thin gold stripe, about one-fifth of the red stripe, and a blue stripe, almost double the red stripe. The red gold pattern is mirrored on both sides.

== List of known recipients ==
- Queen Alexandra, the King's wife
- Princess Victoria, the King's daughter

== See also ==
- Royal Family Order of George IV
- Royal Order of Victoria and Albert
- Royal Family Order of George V
- Royal Family Order of George VI
- Royal Family Order of Elizabeth II
- Royal Family Order of Charles III
