= Royal Family Order of George VI =

British honour

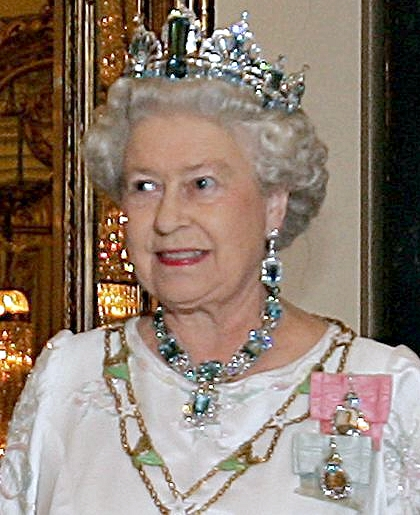
- Queen Elizabeth II wearing the Royal Family Order of George VI (above that of George V)

Awarded by King George VI
- Type: Royal Family Order
- Country: United Kingdom
- Ribbon: Rose pink
- Eligibility: Female members of the British royal family
- Criteria: At His Majesty's pleasure
- Status: Not awarded since the death of George VI
- Ribbon of the Order

The Royal Family Order of George VI is an honour that was bestowed on female members of the British royal family by King George VI.

Princess Alexandra, The Hon. Lady Ogilvy is the last surviving member after the death of her cousin Queen Elizabeth II in 2022.

== Appearance ==
The insignia, an enamel portrait of the King surrounded by diamonds, is worn on a bow of rose pink ribbon.

It was provided in two different sizes: the larger version was bestowed on the King's wife and mother, and the second to the other recipients. The first examples were presented at a family luncheon on 10 May 1937, two days before the King’s Coronation.

== List of known recipients ==
Size 1:

- Queen Elizabeth, George VI's wife
- Queen Mary, George VI's mother

Size 2:

- Princess Elizabeth, Duchess of Edinburgh, George VI's elder daughter
- Princess Margaret, George VI's younger daughter
- The Princess Royal, George VI's sister
- The Duchess of Gloucester, George VI's sister-in-law
- The Duchess of Kent, George VI's sister-in-law
- Princess Alexandra of Kent, George VI's niece

== See also ==
- Royal family order
- Royal family orders of the United Kingdom
- Royal Family Order of George IV
- Royal Order of Victoria and Albert
- Royal Family Order of Edward VII
- Royal Family Order of George V
- Royal Family Order of Elizabeth II
- Royal Family Order of Charles III
