= Royal family order =

Decoration conferred by the head of a royal family to their female relations

A royal family order or royal family decoration is a decoration conferred by the head of a royal family to their female relations. Such a decoration is considered more of a personal memento than a state decoration, although it may be worn during official state occasions.

The tradition is practiced in the royal families of the United Kingdom, Norway, Sweden, Denmark, Thailand and Tonga.

== Insignia ==
The badge of a royal family order consists of a portrait of the sovereign set in diamonds, which is suspended from a ribbon. In the United Kingdom, the colour of the ribbon changes with each reign, the only kingdom that has this trait. On the back of the portrait frame is an engraving with the sovereign's monogram. A hidden pin attaches it to the wearer's clothes.

== Sweden ==
Kungens miniatyrporträtt (literally the "King's miniature portrait") is a royal decoration unofficially given to female members of the Swedish royal family. It is similar to the family orders of other European monarchies, although the Swedish royal court refers to it as "The King's portrait".

=== History ===
The earliest known Swedish decoration is that of King Oscar II. At that time, Decorations did not have to be attached to the Seraphim blue ribbon that is the case today. As there are no earlier records of royal family decorations in Sweden, it might be assumed that the decorations were not introduced in Sweden until the reign of King Oscar II. Queen Sophia started "Sophiahemmet", a Red Cross nurse training program. At the graduation of the nurses, she presented a miniature portrait of the King on a white ribbon with a red cross. On the back was DSF inscribed in gold enamel on blue background. In the 1900s Gustav V and his wife Victoria made a special form of the order with both of them in the portrait, painted by Fanny Hjelm, as a gift to their friend Countess Anna Brahe (born Anna Nordenfalk) when she visited them. Currently recipients of the order wear it as part of their formal dress, often when their male counterparts wear medals.

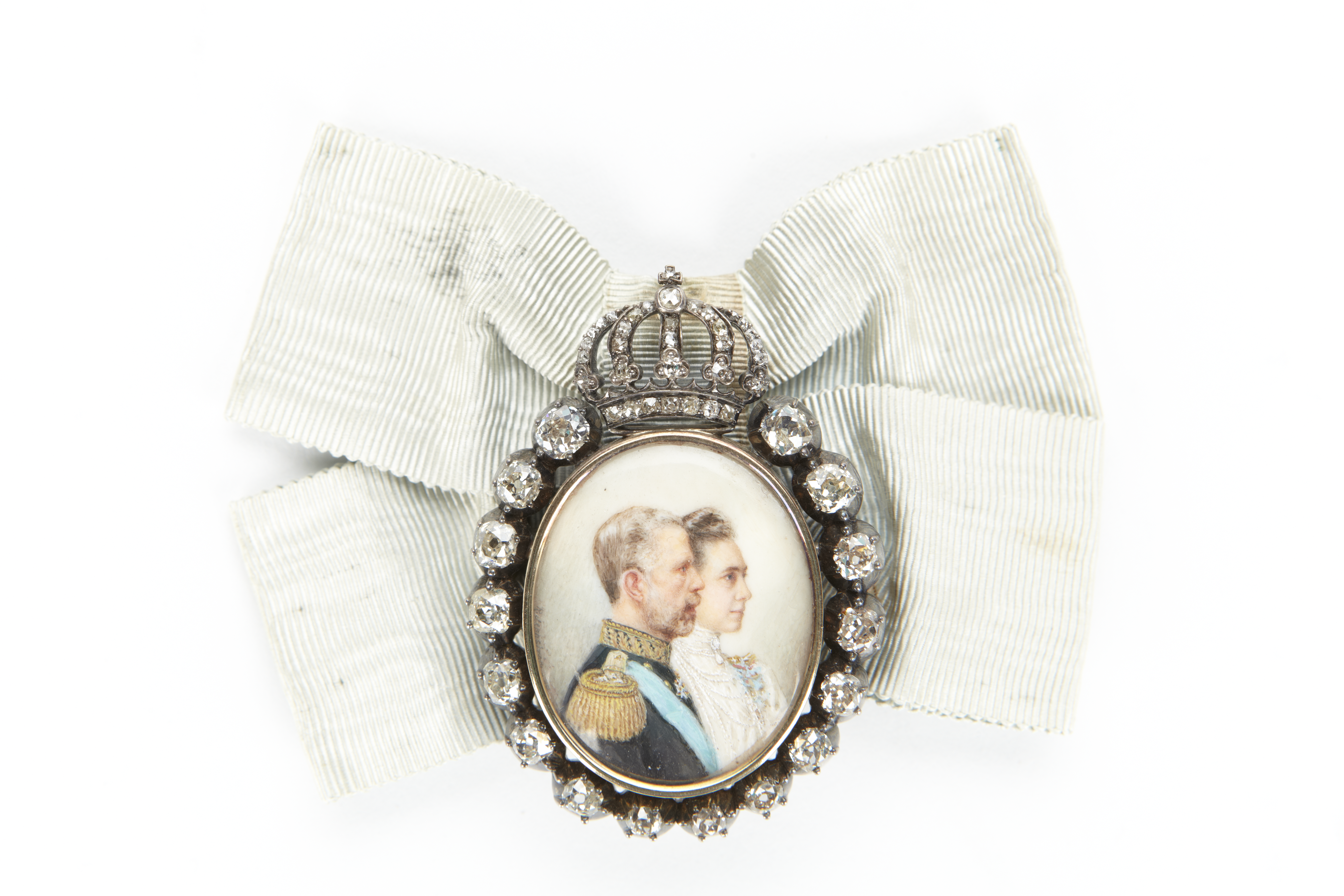
Order with Gustav and Victoria

=== Appearance ===
The decoration currently consists of an oval portrait of a young King Carl XVI Gustaf half length. There are different versions of the portrait of the King, where he is dressed in admiral's uniform or simply formal wear with either the Seraphim band or chain. The portrait is framed by brilliant-cut diamonds and a brilliant bow at the portrait above page. The portrait is attached to a bow in Seraphim light blue ribbon and is held to the person's attire with a pin that is not seen. Different designs of the frame exist: some are more decorated than others.

=== Recipients ===
==== From King Oscar II ====
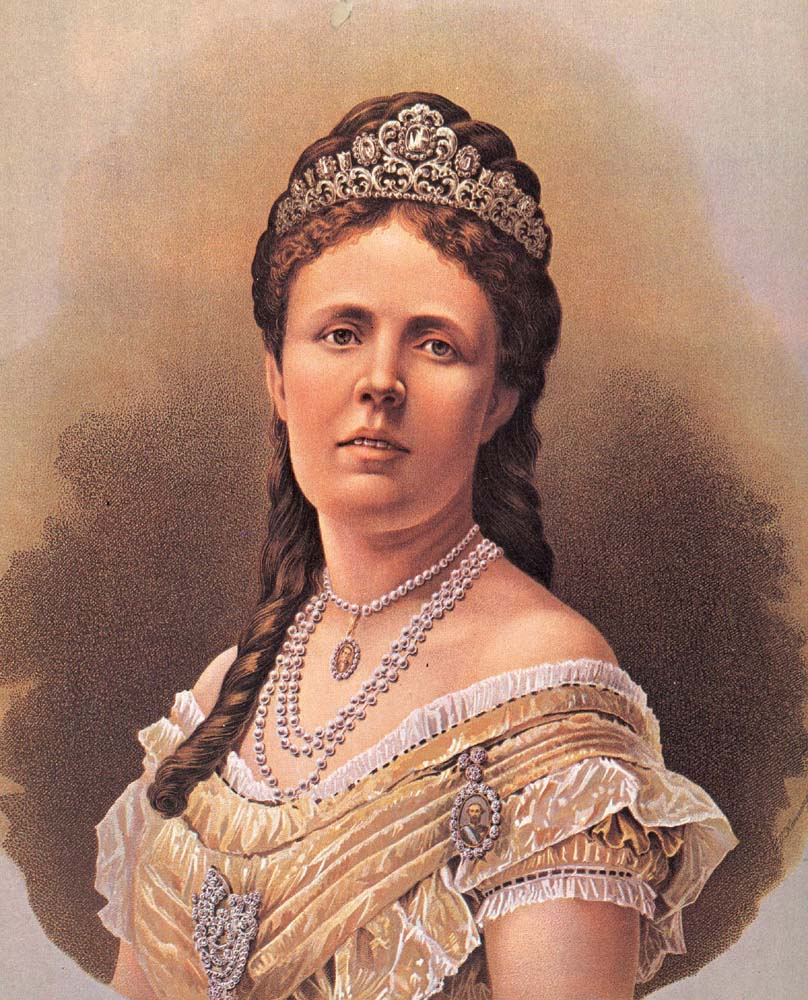
Sofia of Nassau wearing the order of Oscar II
- Queen Sophia - (wife)
- Crown Princess Victoria - (daughter-in-law)

==== From King Gustaf V ====
- Queen Victoria - (wife)
- Queen Sophia - (mother)
- Ingrid, Queen of Denmark - (granddaughter)
- Crown Princess Margaret - (daughter-in-law)
- Grand Duchess Maria Pavlovna - (daughter-in-law)
- Crown Princess Louise - (daughter-in-law)
- Princess Sibylla, Duchess of Västerbotten - (granddaughter-in-Law)

==== From King Gustaf VI Adolf ====
- Queen Louise (wife)
- Ingrid, Queen of Denmark - (daughter)
- Princess Margaretha, Mrs. Ambler - (granddaughter)
- Princess Birgitta - (granddaughter)
- Princess Désirée, Baroness Silfverschiöld - (granddaughter)
- Princess Christina, Mrs. Magnuson - (granddaughter)
- Princess Sibylla, Duchess of Västerbotten - (daughter-in-law)

==== From King Carl XVI Gustaf ====
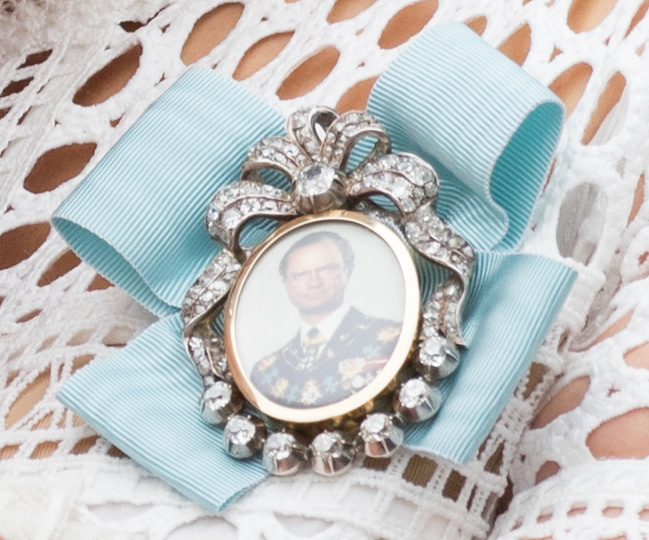
Swedish order with king Carl XVI Gustaf

- Princess Margaretha, Mrs. Ambler (1st eldest sister)
- Princess Birgitta (2nd eldest sister)
- Princess Désirée, Baroness Silfverschiöld (3rd eldest sister)
- Princess Christina, Mrs. Magnuson (4th eldest sister)
- Ingrid, Queen Dowager of Denmark (aunt)
- Queen Silvia (wife)
- Crown Princess Victoria (1st daughter)
- Princess Madeleine, Duchess of Hälsingland and Gästrikland (2nd daughter)
- Princess Lilian, Duchess of Halland (aunt by marriage)
- Princess Sofia, Duchess of Värmland (daughter-in-law)
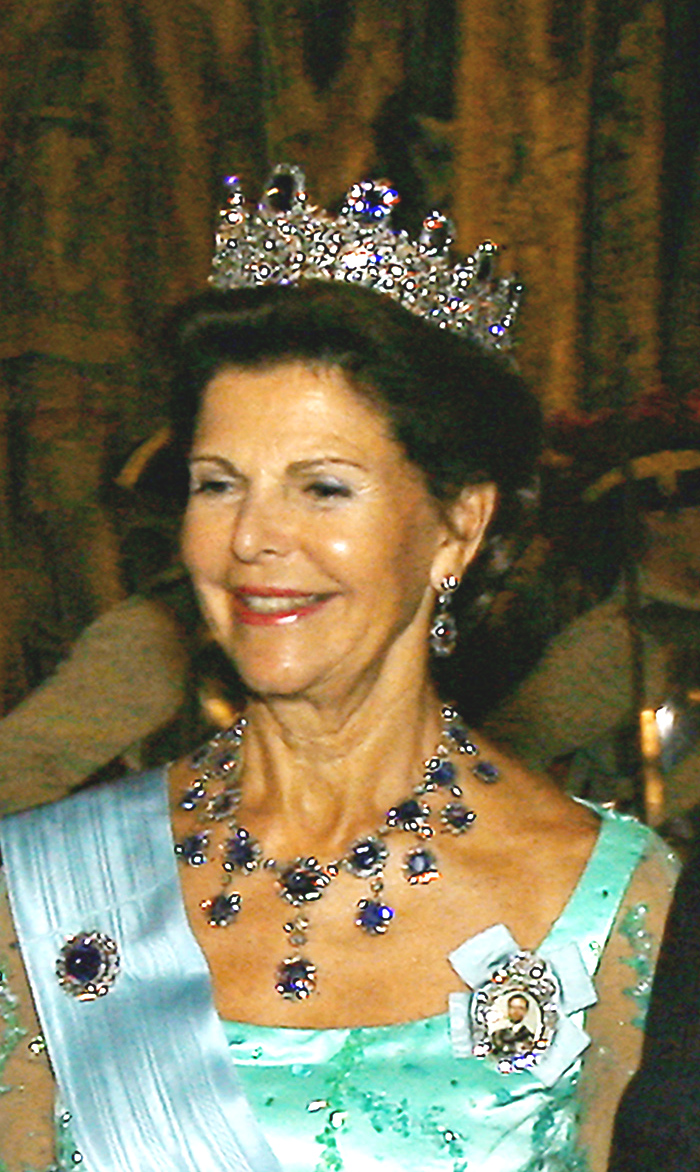
Queen Silvia wearing her order.

Princess Madeleine wearing her order.

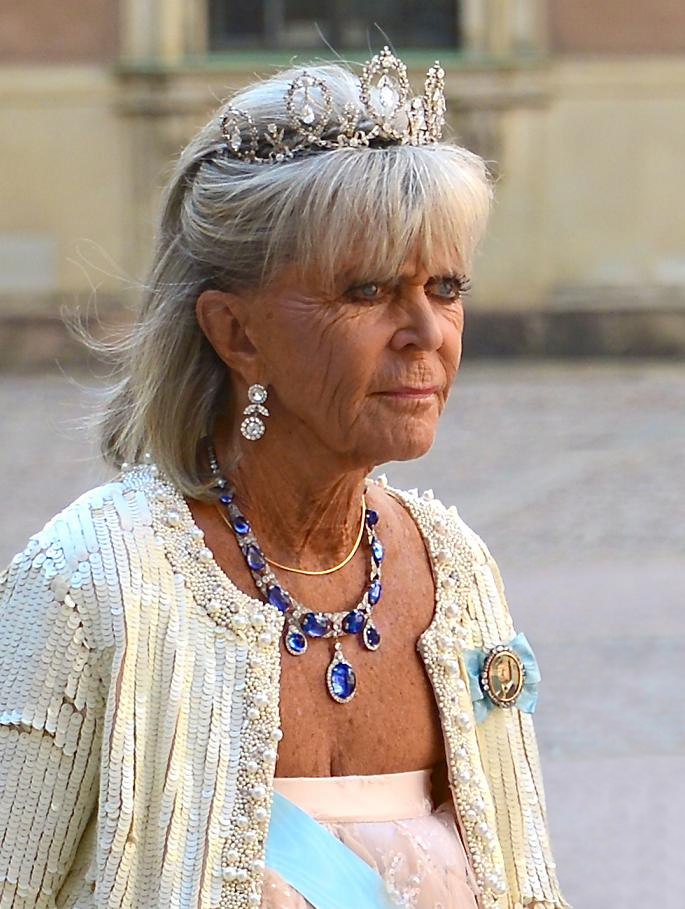
Princess Birgitta wearing her order.

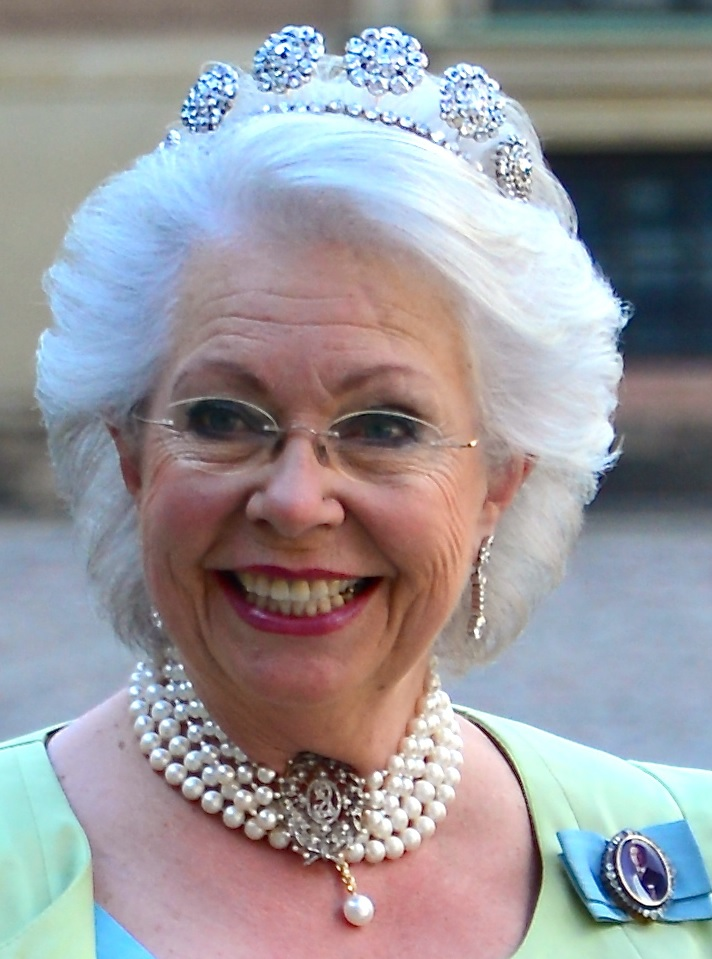
Princess Christina, Mrs. Magnuson, wearing her order.

== Denmark ==
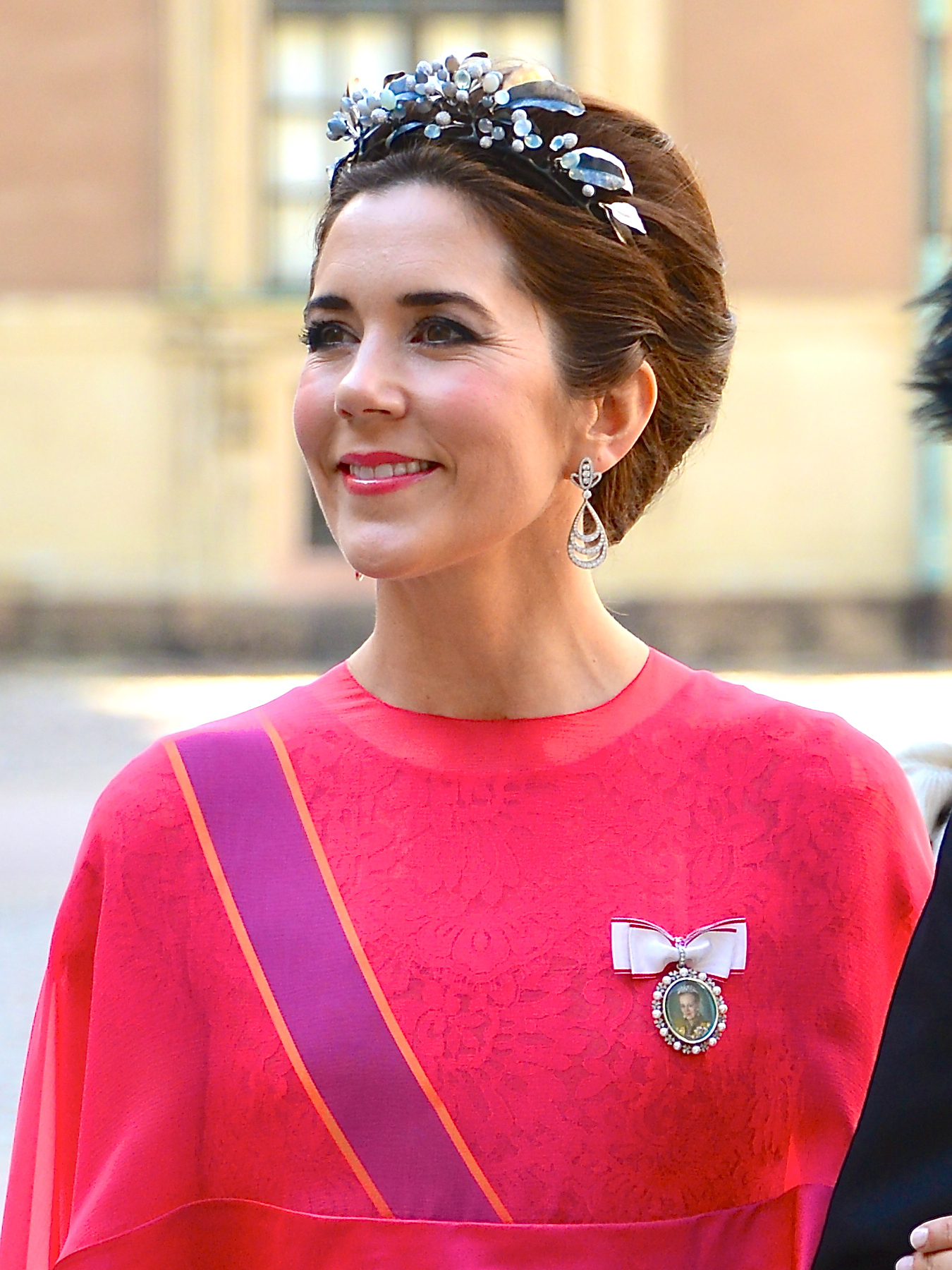
Queen Mary wearing the insignia of the order

After the banishment of the adulterous Queen Caroline Mathilde on 17 January 1772, the Royal Danish Court needed a new decoration to replace the Order of Matilde. King Christian VII of Denmark founded this order on 21 October 1774 as a new decoration that was solely meant for the Danish Royal Family. It was awarded to both gentlemen and ladies. The men wore the insignia detached from a ribbon on the left side of the breast. The ladies wore the same insignia on a bow of the same ribbon on their left shoulder.

After the death of Queen-Dowager Juliana Maria in 1796, the order fell into disuse.

King Christian IX revived the custom, which continues to the present.

- Royal Family Decoration of King Christian VII (1774–1796)
- Royal Family Decoration of King Christian IX (1863–1906)
- Royal Family Decoration of King Christian X (1912–1947)
- Royal Family Decoration of King Frederik IX (1947–1972)
- Royal Family Decoration of Queen Margrethe II (1972–2024)
- Royal Family Decoration of King Frederik X (2024–Present)

== Estwatini ==
Estwatini has a Royal Family Order.

== Norway ==
- Royal Family Order of Haakon VII (1906–1957)
- Royal Family Order of Olav V (1957–1991)
- Royal Family Order of Harald V (1991–2026)

== United Kingdom ==
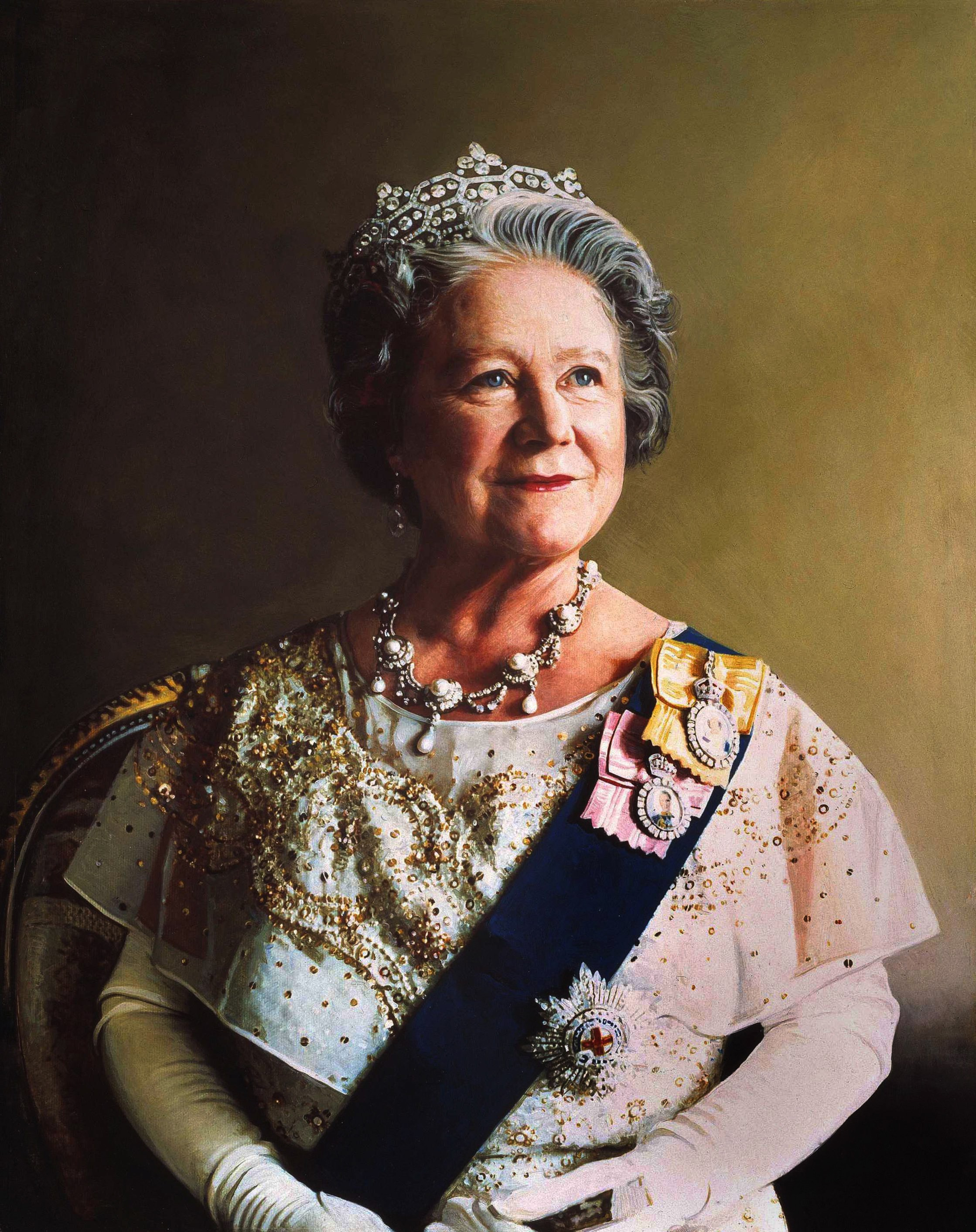
Queen Elizabeth the Queen Mother wearing the orders of George VI and Elizabeth II

The first Royal Family Order was issued during and after the regency of King George IV. Prior to 1820, he started the practice of presenting the badge of the order to ladies and gentlemen of the Court, particularly female members of the Royal Family. An ornate frame of diamond oak leaves and acorns surrounded his portrait, suspended from a white silk bow which varied for men and women.

=== Royal family orders ===
- Royal Family Order of George IV (1821)
- Royal Order of Victoria and Albert (1862)
- Royal Family Order of Edward VII (1901)
- Royal Family Order of George V (1911)
- Royal Family Order of George VI (1937)
- Royal Family Order of Elizabeth II (1952)
- Royal Family Order of Charles III (2024)

== Thailand ==
Thailand has a Royal Family Order.

== Tonga ==
Tonga is the only Commonwealth monarchy other than the U.K. to confer a Royal Family Order (status: dormant).

- King George Tupou V Royal Family Order (2008–2012)
