= Royal Family Order of George IV =

British honour

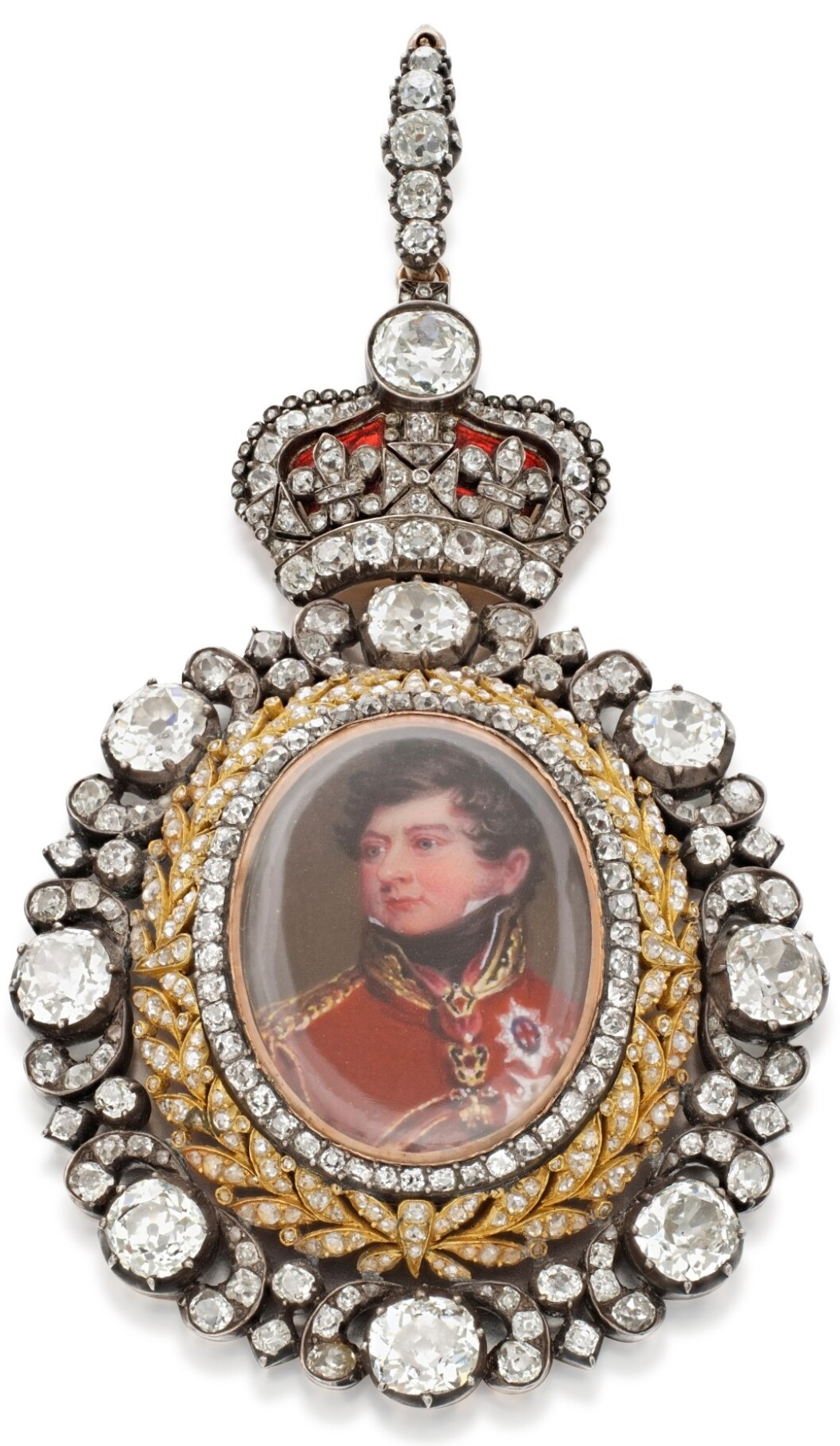

Awarded by King George IV
- Type: Royal Family Order
- Country: United Kingdom
- Ribbon: Blue
- Eligibility: Female members of the British royal family
- Criteria: At His Majesty's pleasure
- Status: Defunct; not awarded since the death of George IV

The Royal Family Order of George IV is an honour that was bestowed as a mark of personal esteem on female members of the British royal family by King George IV. It was the first Royal Family Order issued in the United Kingdom. Prior to George IV's accession in 1820, both ladies and gentlemen of the Court, as well as female members of the royal family, had worn the Sovereign's portrait set in a jewelled frame. George IV formalised the order.

== Appearance ==
King George IV's Royal Family Order was rather ornate in appearance, and the frame that surrounded his portrait was of diamond oak leaves and acorns. The badge was worn on "a blue ribbon on the left shoulder", as noted in Letters of Queen Victoria. 1st series I p.16.. Examples of the order in the Royal Collection are in at least three different designs (items RCIN 441442, RCIN 441443, and RCIN 441444).

== List of known recipients ==
- Charlotte, Princess Royal, Queen of Württemberg, sister of George IV
- Princess Augusta Sophia, sister of George IV
- Princess Elizabeth of the United Kingdom, Landgravine of Hesse-Homburg, sister of George IV
- Princess Mary, Duchess of Gloucester and Edinburgh, sister of George IV
- Princess Sophia, sister of George IV
- Adelaide of Saxe-Meiningen, Duchess of Clarence and St Andrews, sister-in-law of George IV
- Princess Victoria of Saxe-Coburg-Saalfeld, Duchess of Kent and Strathearn, sister-in-law of George IV
- Frederica of Mecklenburg-Strelitz, Duchess of Cumberland and Teviotdale, sister-in-law of George IV
- Princess Augusta of Hesse-Kassel, Duchess of Cambridge, sister-in-law of George IV
- Princess Sophia of Gloucester, first cousin of George IV
- Princess Alexandrina Victoria of Kent, later Queen Victoria, niece of George IV
- Princess Augusta of Cambridge, niece of George IV
- Princess Dorothea Lieven

== See also ==
- Royal Order of Victoria and Albert
- Royal Family Order of Edward VII
- Royal Family Order of George V
- Royal Family Order of George VI
- Royal Family Order of Elizabeth II
- Royal Family Order of Charles III
