= Royal Order of Victoria and Albert =

British honour

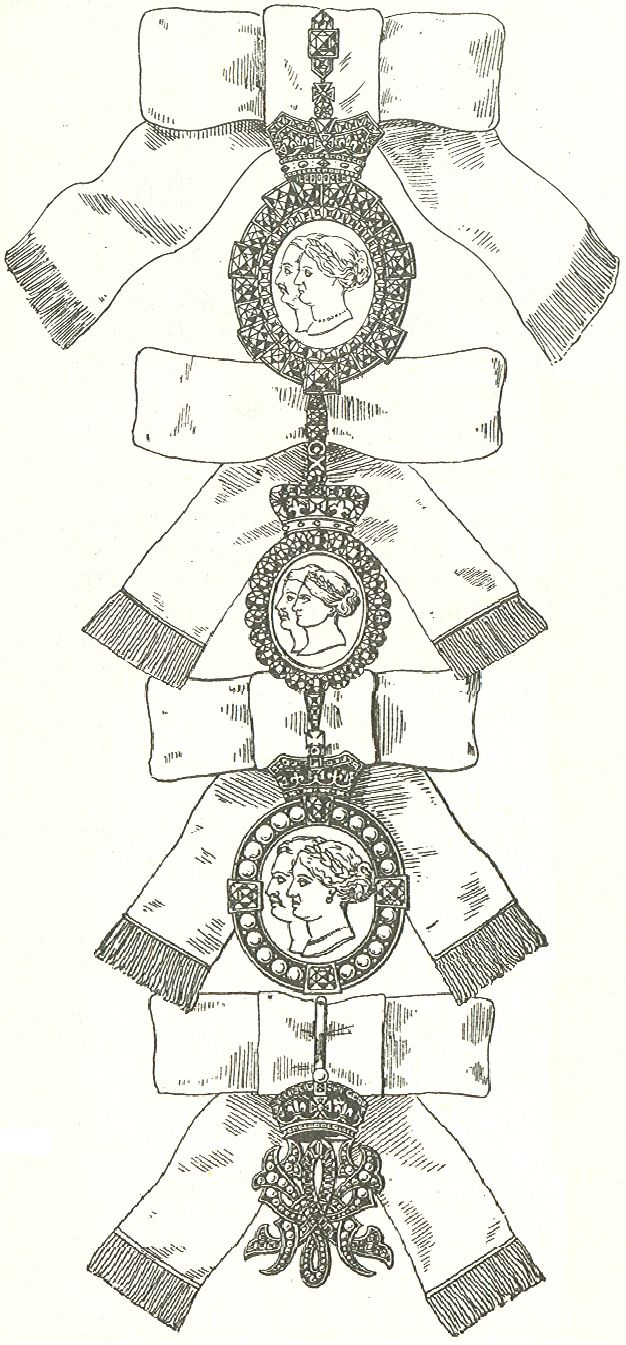
- The four grades of the Order

Awarded by Queen Victoria
- Type: Royal Family Order
- Country: United Kingdom
- Ribbon: White
- Eligibility: Female members of the British royal family and female courtiers
- Criteria: At Her Majesty's pleasure
- Status: Defunct; not awarded since the death of Queen Victoria
- Post-nominals: VA
- Ribbon of the Order

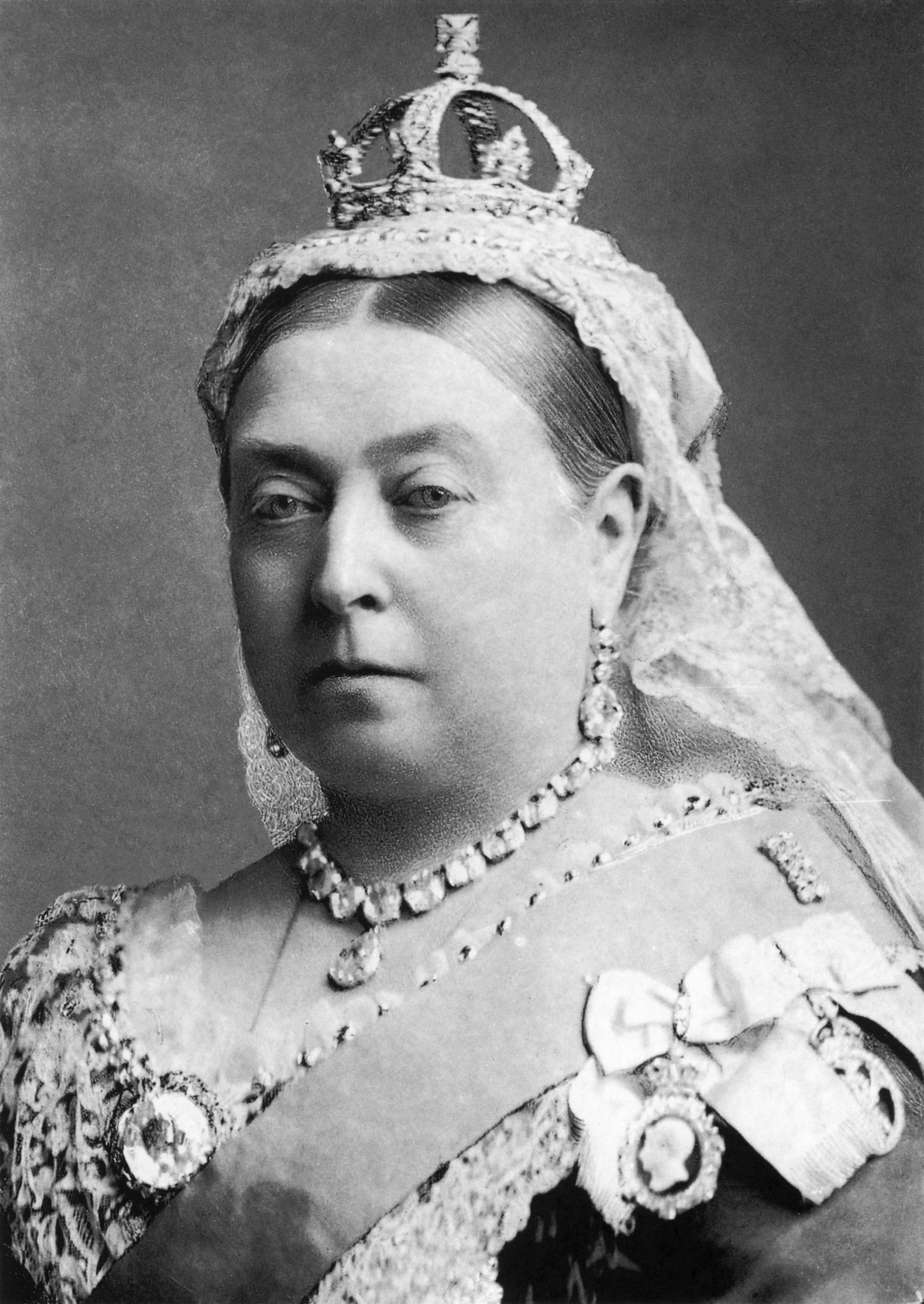
Portrait of Queen Victoria at her Golden Jubilee, wearing the Sovereign's badge of the Order

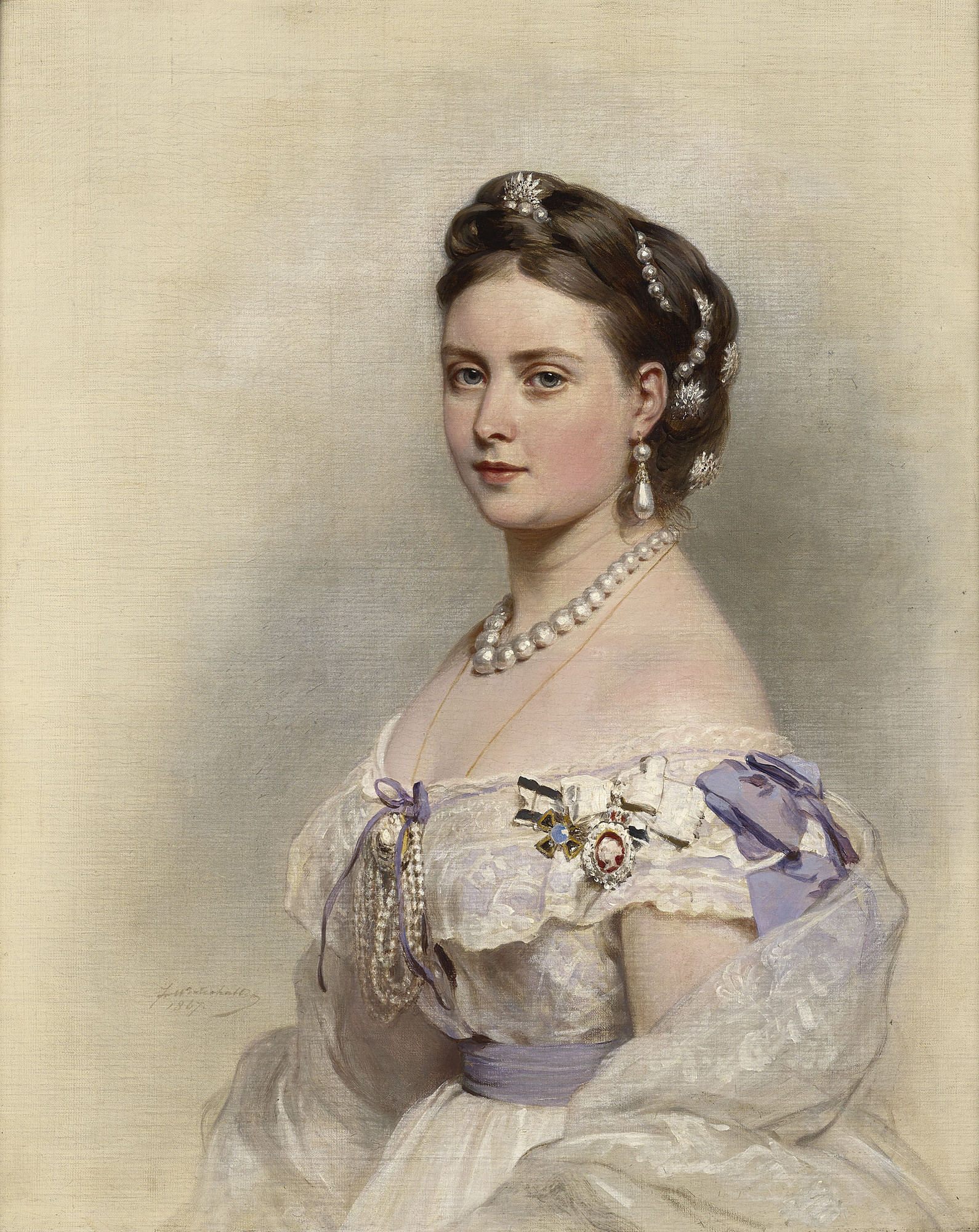
The German Empress Victoria wearing the Order, along with the Prussian Order of Louise (also an order only for women)

The Royal Order of Victoria and Albert is a British royal family order instituted on 10 February 1862 by Queen Victoria, and enlarged on 10 October 1864, 15 November 1865, and 15 March 1880. No award has been made since the death of Queen Victoria.

The order had four classes and was granted to female members of the British royal family and female courtiers. For the first three classes, the badge consisted of a medallion of Queen Victoria and Albert, Prince Consort, differing in the width and jewelling of the border as the classes descend, whilst the fourth substitutes a jewelled cipher. All four were surmounted by a crown, which was attached to a bow of white silk moiré ribbon. The honour conferred no rank or title upon the recipient, but recipients were entitled to use the post-nominal letters "VA".

The last holder of the Order, Princess Alice, Countess of Athlone, died in 1981.

== Recipients ==
- 1863 Alexandra, Princess of Wales
- Elizabeth Biddulph, Baroness Biddulph (Woman of the Bedchamber)
- The Countess of Mount Edgcumbe (Lady of the Bedchamber)
- Jane Spencer, Baroness Churchill (Lady of the Bedchamber)
- 1889: Hariot Hamilton-Temple-Blackwood, Marchioness of Dufferin and Ava
- Edith Bulwer-Lytton, Countess of Lytton

a full list of recipients is published on pages 37–41 of Royal Service Volume 2

== Sources ==
- Whitaker's Almanack, 1893
- British Imperial Calendar, 1900, 1902
- The Times

== See also ==
- Royal Family Order of George IV
- Royal Family Order of Edward VII
- Royal Family Order of George V
- Royal Family Order of George VI
- Royal Family Order of Elizabeth II
- Royal Family Order of Charles III
- List of awards honoring women
