= Royal Family Order of George V =

British honour

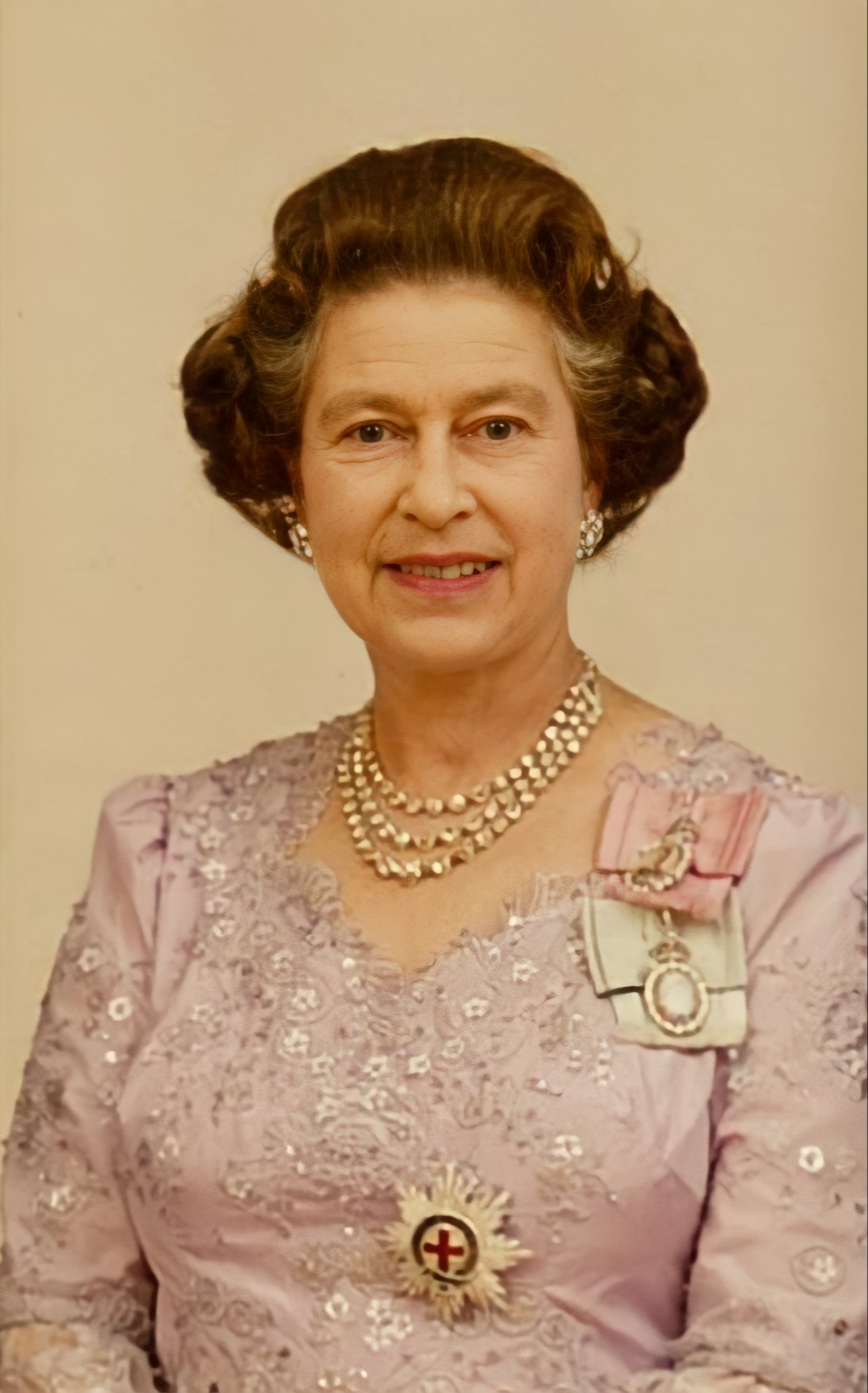
- Queen Elizabeth II wearing the Royal Family Order of George V (below that of George VI)

Awarded by King George V
- Type: Royal Family Order
- Country: United Kingdom
- Ribbon: Pale blue
- Eligibility: Female members of the British royal family
- Criteria: At His Majesty's pleasure
- Status: Defunct; not awarded since the death of George V
- Ribbon of the Order

The Royal Family Order of George V is an honour that was bestowed on female members of the British royal family by King George V.

Queen Elizabeth II was the last surviving recipient when she died on 8 September 2022.

== Appearance ==
The order consists of a miniature of the king in naval uniform set in a crowned oval diamond frame and suspended from a pale blue ribbon. It was provided in four different sizes: the largest version was bestowed on the King's wife and mother, the next largest went to his daughter and daughters-in-law, his sisters and his aunts; a smaller version was given to his granddaughters and the smallest to a number of other female relations.

== List of known recipients ==
Size 1:

- Queen Mary, the King's wife
- Queen Alexandra, the King's mother

Size 2:

- Mary, Princess Royal and Countess of Harewood, the King's daughter
- Louise, Princess Royal, the King's sister
- Princess Victoria, the King's sister
- Queen Maud of Norway, the King's sister
- Princess Christian, the King's paternal aunt
- Princess Louise, Duchess of Argyll, the King's paternal aunt
- Princess Beatrice, the King's paternal aunt
- Princess Louise Margaret, Duchess of Connaught and Strathearn, the King's paternal aunt by marriage
- Maria, Duchess of Edinburgh and Saxe-Coburg and Gotha, the King's paternal aunt by marriage
- Princess Helen, Duchess of Albany, the King's paternal aunt by marriage
- Elizabeth, Duchess of York, the King's daughter-in-law
- Princess Marina, Duchess of Kent, the King's daughter-in-law
- Alice, Duchess of Gloucester, the King's daughter-in-law

Size 3:

- Princess Elizabeth of York, the King's granddaughter
- Princess Margaret of York, the King's granddaughter

Size 4

- Princess Alice, Countess of Athlone, the King's first cousin
- Princess Arthur of Connaught, Duchess of Fife, the King's niece
- Lady Maud Carnegie, the King's niece
- Margaret Cambridge, Marchioness of Cambridge, the King's sister-in-law
- Margaret, Crown Princess of Sweden, the King's first cousin
- Lady Patricia Ramsay, the King's first cousin

== See also ==
- Royal Family Order of George IV
- Royal Order of Victoria and Albert
- Royal Family Order of Edward VII
- Royal Family Order of George VI
- Royal Family Order of Elizabeth II
- Royal Family Order of Charles III
