= Engelstad =

Engelstad is a Norwegian surname. Notable people with the surname include:

- Carl Fredrik Engelstad (1915–1996), Norwegian writer, playwright, and journalist
- Eivind Stenersen Engelstad (1900–1969), Norwegian archaeologist and art historian
- Fredrik Engelstad (born 1944), Norwegian sociologist
- Gunvald Engelstad (1900–1972), Norwegian politician for the Labour Party
- Helen Engelstad (1908–1989), Norwegian art historian and educator
- Jess Julius Engelstad (1822–1896), Norwegian engineer and railroad administrator
- Kai Arne Engelstad (born 1954), Norwegian speed skater
- Kirsten Engelstad (born 1940), Norwegian librarian
- Oscar Engelstad (1882–1972), Norwegian gymnast who competed in the 1912 Summer Olympics
- Ralph Engelstad (1930–2002), American businessman, owner of the Imperial Palace Hotel and Casino
- Roxann Engelstad, American mechanical engineer
- Sigurd Engelstad (1914–2006) Norwegian genealogist and archivist

== See also ==
- Betty Engelstad Sioux Center, an indoor arena in Grand Forks, North Dakota
- Ralph Engelstad Arena (old), a multi-purpose arena in Grand Forks, North Dakota
- Ralph Engelstad Arena (Minnesota), an indoor arena in Thief River Falls, Minnesota
