= Støylen =

Støylen is a Norwegian surname. Notable people with the surname include:

- André Støylen (born 1968), Norwegian politician
- Bernt Støylen (1858–1937), Norwegian theologian, psalmist and Bishop
- Kaare Støylen (1909–1989), Norwegian theologian and priest
