= Vibeke Engelstad =

- Born: 27 April 1919; Sandefjord, Norway
- Died: 8 July 2004 (aged 85)
- Occupations: Physician; Psychiatrist
- Spouse: Carl Fredrik Engelstad
- Children: Fredrik Engelstad
- Relatives: Kristian Smidt (brother); Sigurd Engelstad (brother-in-law)

Vibeke Engelstad (née Smidt; 27 April 1919 – 8 July 2004) was a Norwegian physician and specialist in psychiatry.

Engelstad was born in Sandefjord to bishop Johannes Smidt and Jofrid Grimstvedt. She was a sister of literary historian Kristian Smidt, and was married to journalist and writer Carl Fredrik Engelstad.

Her books include Sett og hørt som lege i Afrika from 1965, Menneskeriket from 1973, and Mening og Mysterium. Streif i religionspsykologi from 1995.
