= Wedding of Harald, Crown Prince of Norway, and Sonja Haraldsen =

1968 Norwegian royal wedding

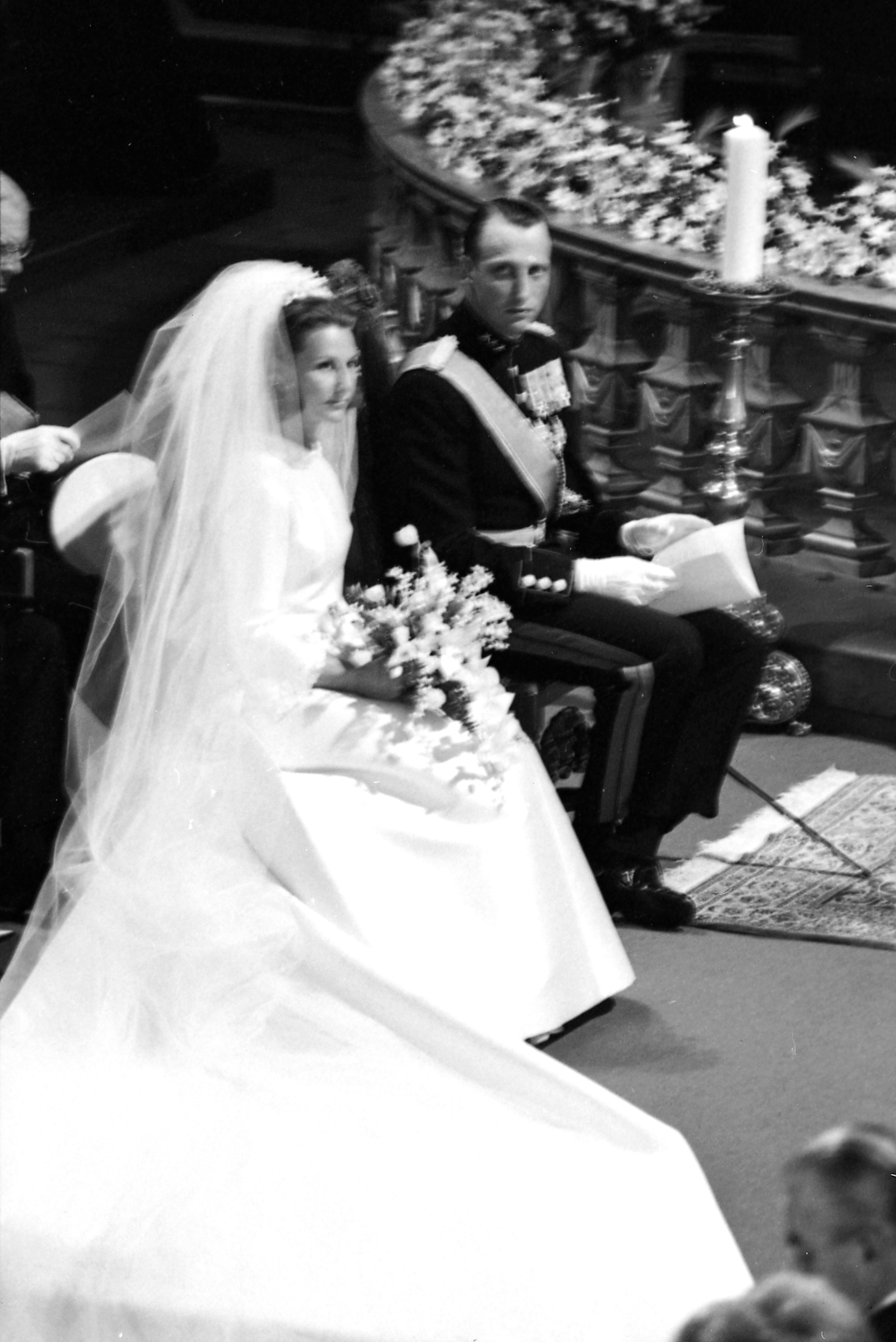
- Harald and Sonja during their wedding ceremony
- Date: 29 August 1968; 58 years ago
- Venue: Oslo Cathedral
- Location: Oslo, Norway
- Participants: Harald, Crown Prince of Norway; Sonja Haraldsen

The wedding of Harald, Crown Prince of Norway, and Sonja Haraldsen took place on Thursday, 29 August 1968, at Oslo Cathedral. The wedding was the culmination of a nine-year courtship as King Olav V, Harald's father, was reluctant to permit his son and heir to marry a commoner. It was the first European royal wedding in which an heir apparent married a non-royal bloodline.

In 1991, Harald and Sonja became King and Queen of Norway, until Harald's death on 28 August 2026, aged 89, just one day before their 58th wedding anniversary.

== Engagement ==
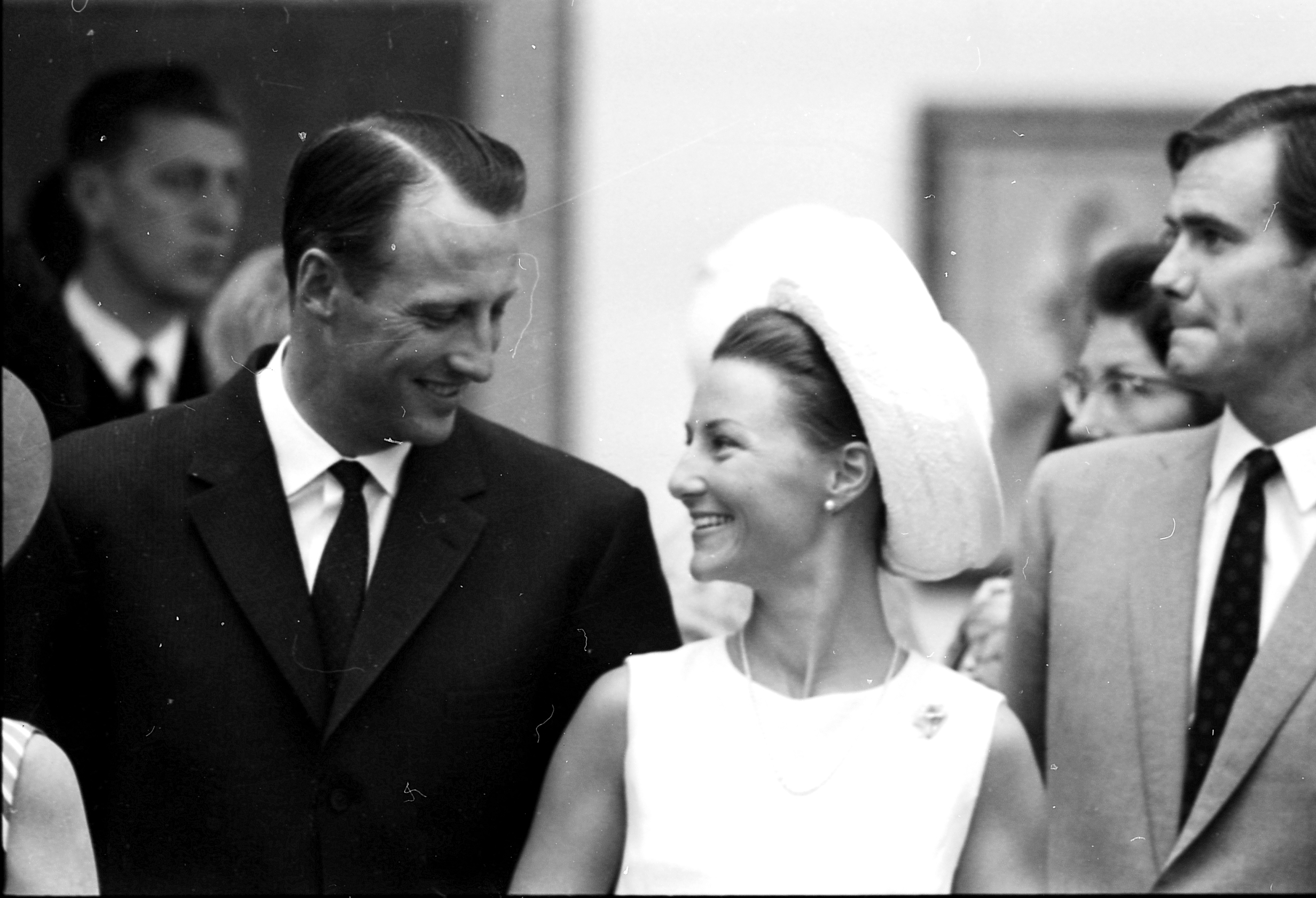
Crown Prince Harald and Sonja Haraldsen, 1968, with Prince Henrik of Denmark, together

Crown Prince Harald, the only son and heir of King Olav V of Norway, first met Sonja Haraldsen, the youngest child of Norwegian manufacturer Karl August Haraldsen (1889–1959) and Dagny Ulrichsen (1898–1994), in June 1959 at a party hosted by their mutual friend Johan Stenersen. In August 1959, Harald invited Sonja to a ball to celebrate his graduation from the Norwegian Military Academy.

Their courtship proved controversial as many felt the Crown Prince should marry a bride of royal descent. King Olav V refused to grant his consent to a non-royal match. The press linked Harald to Princess Alexandra of Kent, Princess Sophia of Greece and Denmark and Princess Irene of Greece and Denmark. Following his 30th birthday in 1967, Harald told his father that if he could not marry Sonja, he would not marry at all. At the time, Harald was the only person in the line of succession to the Norwegian throne, and his not marrying would have ended the reign of his family, and possibly the monarchy, in Norway.

Following consultations with the Norwegian government, who stated that while they could not give their formal approval to the marriage they would not publicly oppose it should the king give his consent, King Olav V eventually relented and on 18 March 1968, he announced the couple's engagement in a statement to the president of the Storting. Flags were flown from public buildings in celebration of the news. Harald presented Sonja with a diamond and ruby ring which had belonged to his late mother, Crown Princess Märtha. Their son, Haakon Magnus, eventually presented the same ring to Mette-Marit Tjessem Høiby.

=== Pre-wedding celebrations ===
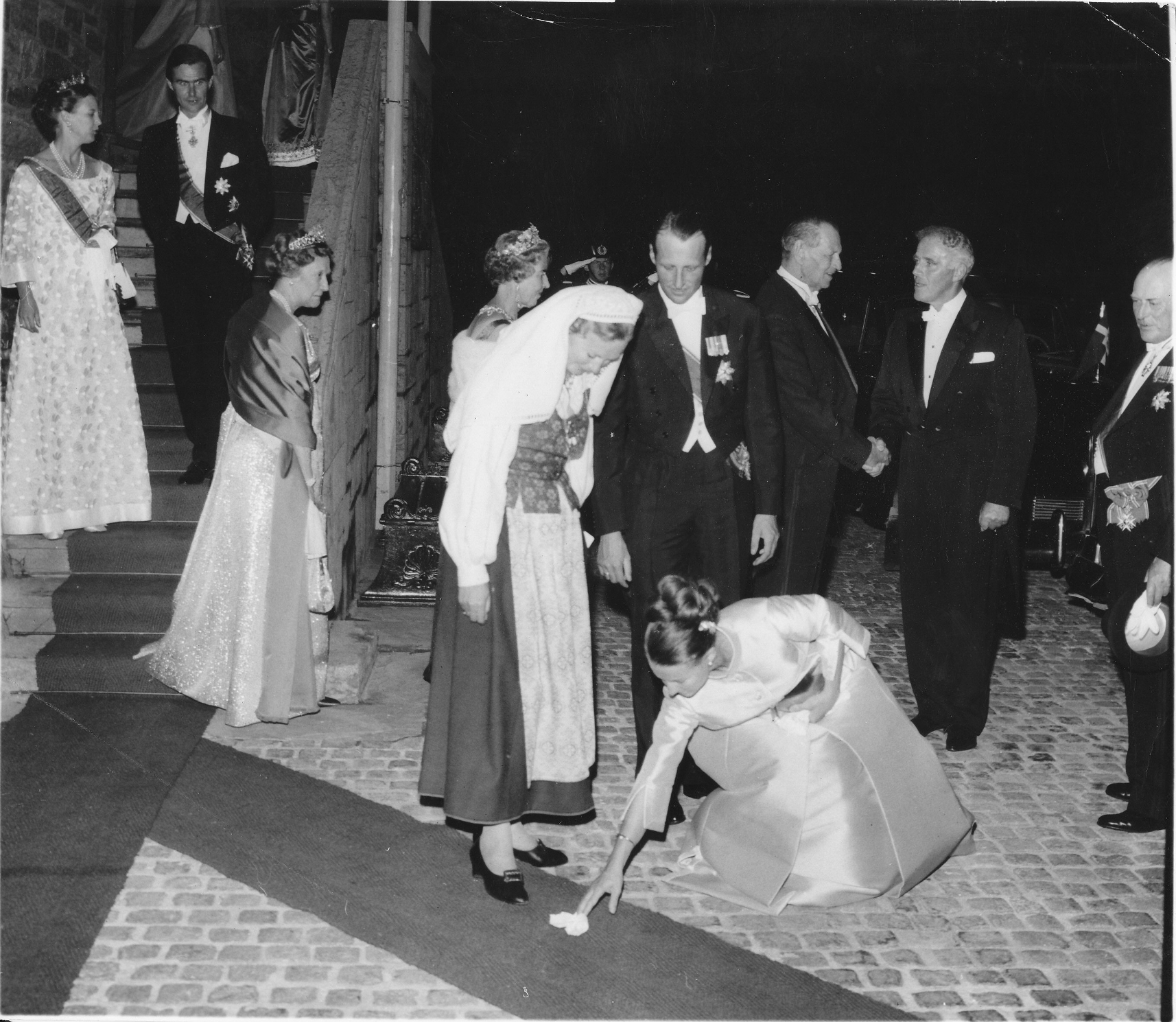
Sonja retrieves Magnhild Borten's dropped handkerchief at the government dinner held at Akershus Fortress

Many of the foreign guests arrived in Oslo on 27 August. A grand ball at the Royal Palace had been planned but was canceled due to the Soviet invasion of Czechoslovakia and the recent sudden death of Princess Marina, Duchess of Kent. Princess Marina was a close friend and third cousin of King Olav V, and also the widow of his first cousin Prince George, Duke of Kent. Instead, the King gave a dinner for the royal guests who had arrived that day.

On 28 August, the couple and royal guests attended a modern art exhibition at the Henie Onstad Kunstsenter. Afterward, Else Werring, overhoffmesterinne of the royal court, and her husband Niels Werring gave a luncheon for the royal guests. That evening, the Norwegian government gave a state dinner at Akershus Fortress.

Commemorative medals for the wedding were minted in both gold and silver and made available to the public. The silver variety remains plentiful and can be obtained on the numismatic market.

== Wedding ==
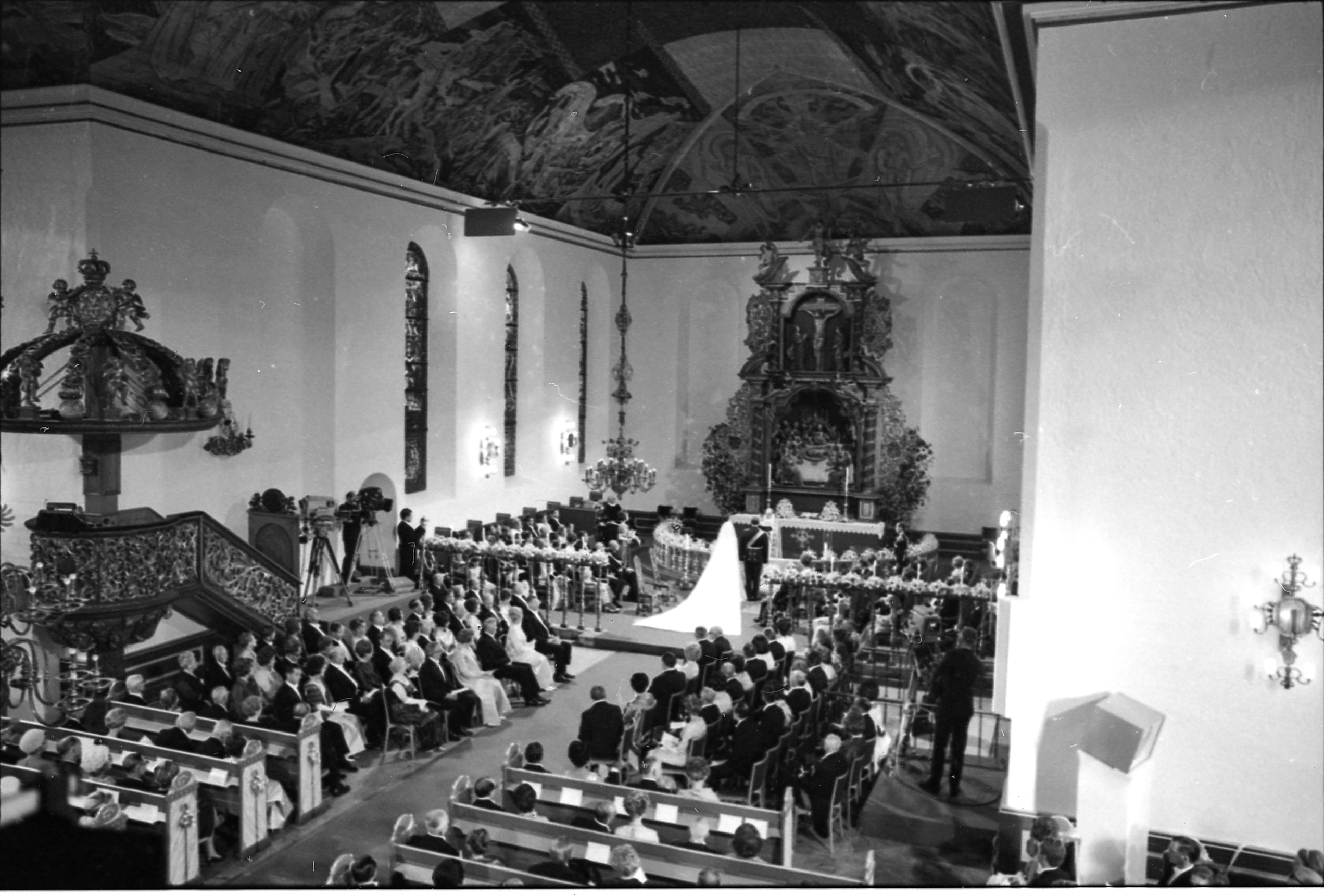
The ceremony in Oslo Cathedral

The ceremony began at 17:00 local time. Dr Fridtjov Søiland Birkeli, Bishop of Oslo, presided over the Church of Norway ceremony at Oslo Cathedral. The cathedral was decorated with more than 2500 roses, marguerites, freesias, sweet peas and gladioli.

3000 soldiers lined the processional route from the Royal Palace to the cathedral. The bells of Oslo City Hall rang from 16:30 local time on. Crown Prince Harald and his best man led the procession.

=== Music ===
Sonja was escorted into the church by King Olav V to Trumpet Tune and Airs by Henry Purcell because the bride's own father Karl August Haraldsen, died nine years earlier prior meeting Harald, nor her brother Haakon Haraldsen, the last direct living male relative. During the service, the Norwegian Student Choral Society sang Herre Gud! Dit dyre navn og ære (Lord God, your precious name and glory) by Petter Dass, the congregation sang the hymn Til kjærleik Gud oss skapte (In love God created us) by Bernt Støylen. Norwegian soprano Aase Nordmo Løvberg sang Alt står i Guds faderhånd (Everything rests in God the Father's hand) by N. F. S. Grundtvig. The bride and groom left the church to Johann Sebastian Bach's Prelude in E♭ major, BWV 552/1.

=== Attire ===
Sonja wore a silk wedding gown by Molstad, a Norwegian department store. Like her sisters-in-law before her, she did not wear a tiara, instead using flowers in her hair to secure her long tulle veil. She carried a bouquet of white roses, freesias, lilies of the valley and orchids.

Crown Prince Harald wore the Norwegian Army's black gala uniform with the riband and star of the Order of St. Olav and the stars of the Order of the Elephant and the Order of the Seraphim. His best man, Count Flemming of Rosenborg, wore the Royal Danish Navy's uniform with the riband and star of the Order of St. Olav and the star of the Order of the Elephant.

=== Attendants ===
Crown Prince Harald's best man was his cousin Count Flemming of Rosenborg. Sonja's maid of honour was her friend Ilmi Riddervold, her bridesmaids were Ingeborg Lorentzen (daughter of Harald's oldest sister Princess Ragnhild), Lis Haraldsen (daughter of her brother Haakon), Ian Henriksen and Anita Henriksen (daughters of her sister Gry).

== Guests ==
850 guests attended the wedding. The guest list was smaller in comparison to the weddings of other heirs apparent. Queen Elizabeth The Queen Mother was set to attend the wedding to represent her daughter, Queen Elizabeth II of the United Kingdom, but the entire British delegation canceled their trip due to the death of Princess Marina, Duchess of Kent two days earlier.

=== Relatives of the groom ===
- The King of Norway, the groom's father
  - Princess Ragnhild, Mrs Lorentzen, and Mr Erling Lorentzen, the groom's sister and brother-in-law
    - Mr Haakon Lorentzen, the groom's nephew
    - Miss Ingeborg Lorentzen, the groom's niece
  - Princess Astrid, Mrs Ferner, and Mr Johan Ferner, the groom's sister and brother-in-law
- Princess Axel of Denmark, the groom's maternal aunt
  - Prince and Princess Georg of Denmark, the groom's maternal first cousin and his wife
  - Count and Countess Flemming of Rosenborg, the groom's maternal first cousin and his wife
- Prince Carl Bernadotte, the groom's maternal uncle
  - Countess Madeleine and Count Charles Ullens de Schooten, the groom's maternal first cousin and her husband

=== Relatives of the bride ===
- Mrs Dagny Haraldsen, the bride's mother
  - Mr Haakon and Mrs Lis Haraldsen, the bride's brother and sister-in-law
    - Miss Lis Dagny Haraldsen, the bride's niece
  - Mrs Gry and Mr Gunnar Henriksen, the bride's sister and brother-in-law
    - Miss Ian Henriksen, the bride's niece
    - Miss Anita Henriksen, the bride's niece

=== Other royal guests ===
- The King of the Belgians, the groom's maternal first cousin
- The King and Queen of Denmark, the groom's paternal first cousin once removed and his maternal second cousin
  - Princess Margrethe and Prince Henrik of Denmark, the groom's paternal second cousin and her husband
- The Grand Duke and Grand Duchess of Luxembourg, the groom's maternal third cousin and his maternal first cousin
- Prince Claus of the Netherlands, husband of the groom's maternal third cousin once removed (representing the Queen of the Netherlands)
- The King of Sweden, the groom's maternal first cousin once removed

=== Republican heads of state ===
- Urho Kekkonen, President of the Republic of Finland, and Sylvi Kekkonen
- Kristján Eldjárn, President of Iceland, and Halldóra Eldjárn

== Reception ==
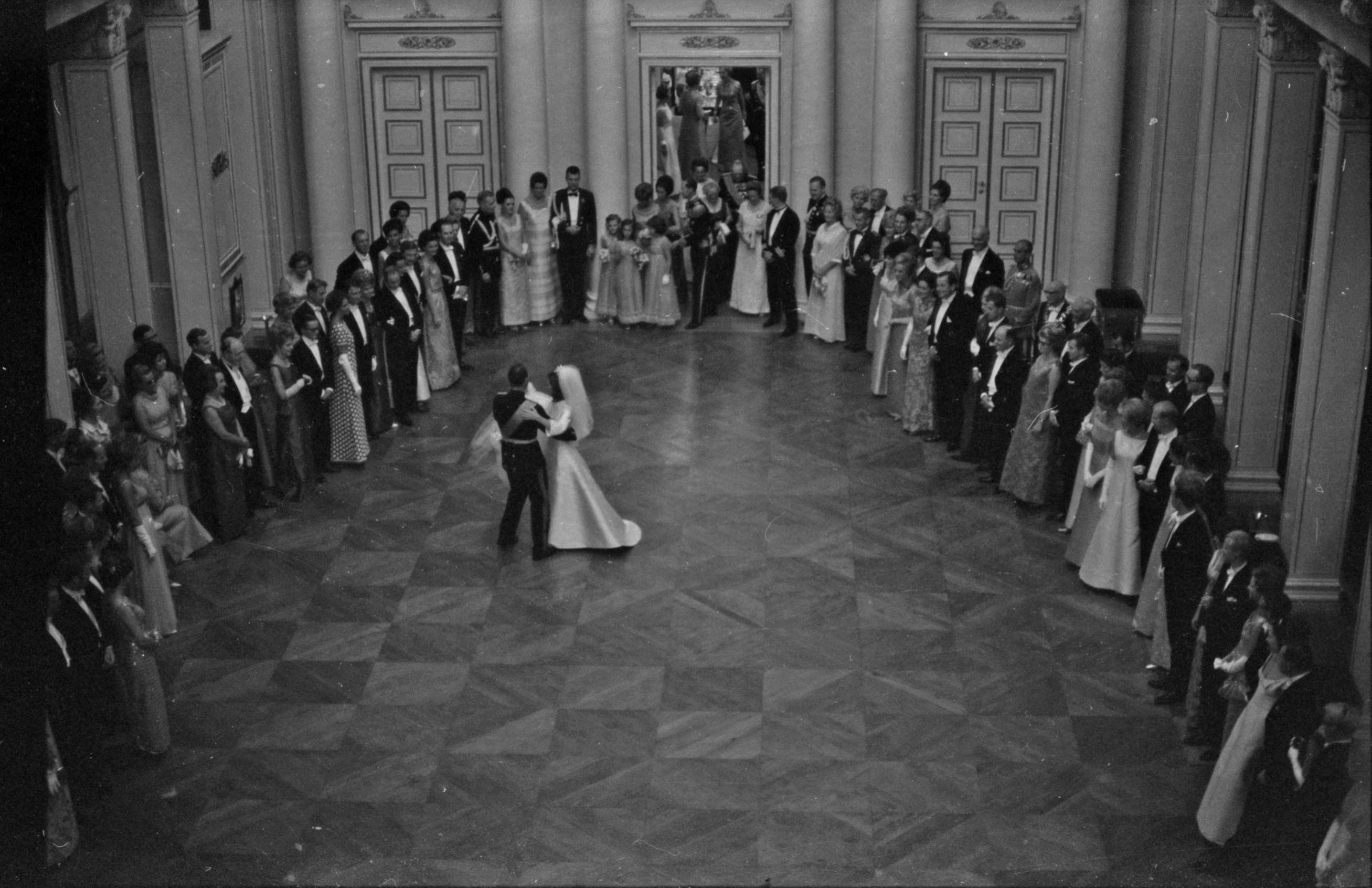
Harald and Sonja waltz at their wedding ball

After the ceremony, a 21-gun salute was fired from Akershus Fortress. The couple and their families returned to the Royal Palace where they appeared on the balcony.

At 19:00 local time, King Olav V hosted a banquet for 225 guests in the palace's grand dining room. The King, Crown Prince Harald and Bernt Ingvaldsen, President of the Storting, all gave speeches. After dinner, dancing began in the ballroom. The Crown Prince and new Crown Princess danced to a specially composed waltz.

== See also ==
- Wedding of Haakon, Crown Prince of Norway, and Mette-Marit Tjessem Høiby
