= Princess Astrid of Norway =

Norwegian princess (1932–2026)

Princess Astrid
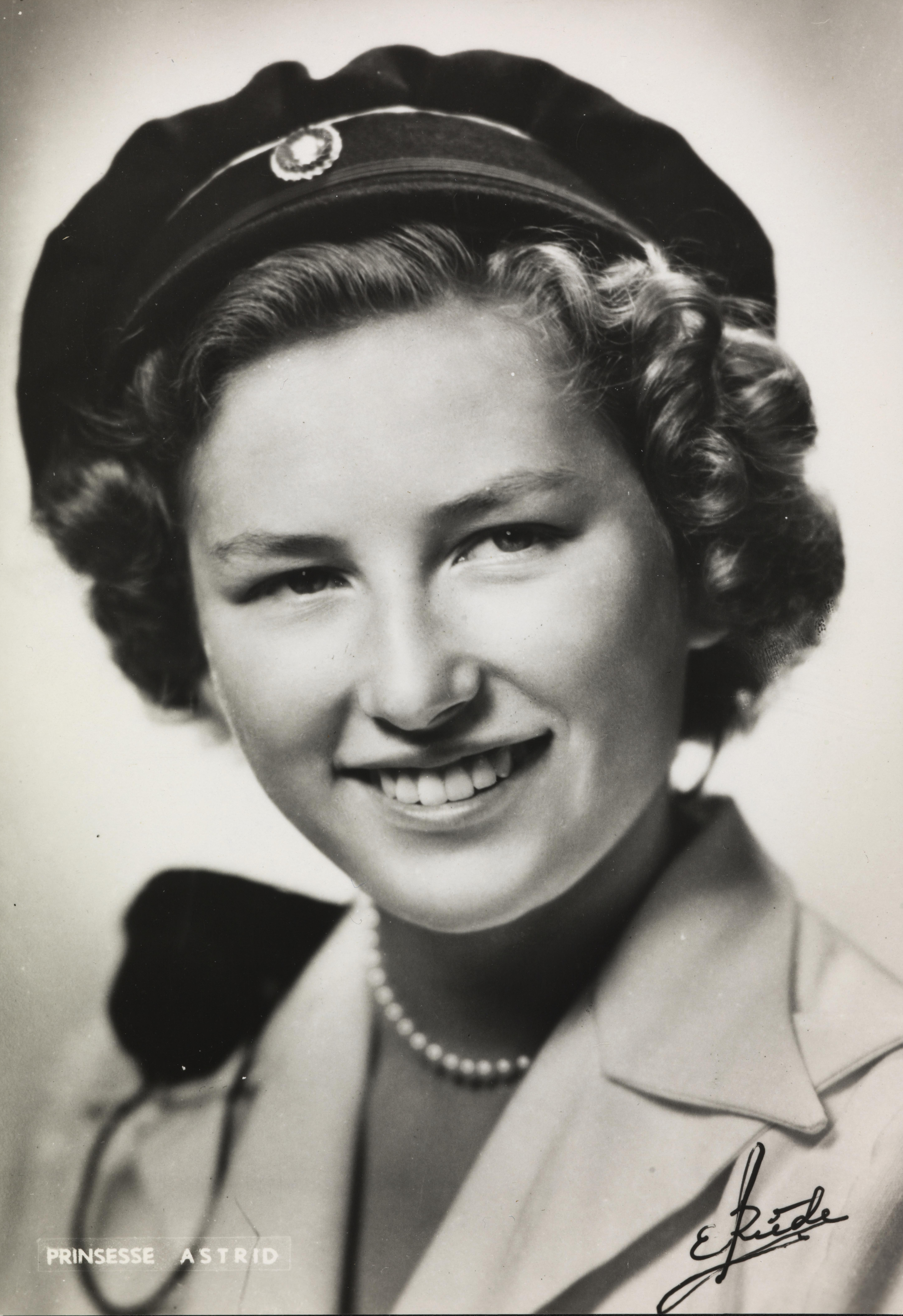
- Astrid in 1950
- Born: 12 February 1932; Villa Solbakken, Oslo, Norway
- Died: 11 September 2026 (aged 94); Rikshospitalet, Oslo, Norway
- Burial: 23 September 2026; Ris Church Cemetery, Oslo, Norway
- Spouse: Johan Ferner (m. 1961; died 2015)
- Issue: Cathrine Ferner Johansen; Benedikte Ferner; Alexander Ferner; Elisabeth Ferner Beckmann; Carl-Christian Ferner
Names
- Astrid Maud Ingeborg
- House: Glücksburg
- Father: Olav V of Norway
- Mother: Märtha of Sweden

Princess Astrid, Mrs. Ferner (Astrid Maud Ingeborg; 12 February 1932 – 11 September 2026) was the second child and youngest daughter of King Olav V of Norway and Princess Märtha of Sweden. Astrid was the older sister of King Harald V and the aunt of King Haakon VIII. Following her mother's death in 1954, she served as Norway's first lady during the reign of her grandfather, King Haakon VII, and continued in this role throughout her father's reign until her brother's marriage in 1968.

Astrid married Johan Ferner in 1961 and had five children. In later life she undertook public engagements, received an honorary government pension, and remained active in commemorative events. She was the chair of Crown Princess Märtha's Memorial Fund and patron of several organisations, particularly those supporting children and young people with dyslexia.

== Early life and education ==
Astrid was born on 12 February 1932 at Villa Solbakken to the future King Olav V and Crown Princess Märtha. She was baptised in the Palace Chapel on 31 March. Her godparents were her paternal grandparents, King Haakon VII and Queen Maud of Norway; her maternal grandparents, Prince Carl and Princess Ingeborg of Sweden; her maternal aunt, Princess Astrid, Duchess of Brabant; Elizabeth, Duchess of York; her great aunt, Princess Thyra of Denmark; her great uncle, Prince Eugen of Sweden; and Prince George of the United Kingdom. She was named after her maternal aunt, her paternal grandmother, and her maternal grandmother. Astrid was a great-granddaughter of King Edward VII of the United Kingdom and therefore a second cousin of Queen Elizabeth II. At the time of her birth, she was 18th in the line of succession to the British throne.

She grew up on the royal estate of Skaugum in Asker and was privately educated. During World War II, she joined her family in fleeing the Nazi invasion and spent the war years in exile in Washington, D.C., with her mother, brother, and sister. After the royal family returned to Norway, she attended Nissen's Girls' School.

Her confirmation took place on 9 May 1948 in the Palace Chapel. Astrid studied ceramics with Halvor Sandøs and maintained her own pottery studio at Skaugum. She was also an accomplished skier and yachtswoman.

After completing the examen artium in 1950, Astrid studied economics and political history for two years at Lady Margaret Hall, Oxford University.

== Public role ==
Astrid's mother died in 1954. From that year until her brother's marriage to Sonja Haraldsen in August 1968, she served as the senior lady of the court and acted as Norway's first lady, undertaking representation duties alongside her father, including state visits. In September 1954, she took part in the ship tour organised by Queen Frederica and King Paul of Greece, later known as the "Cruise of the Kings", which was attended by more than 100 European royals.

== Marriage and children ==
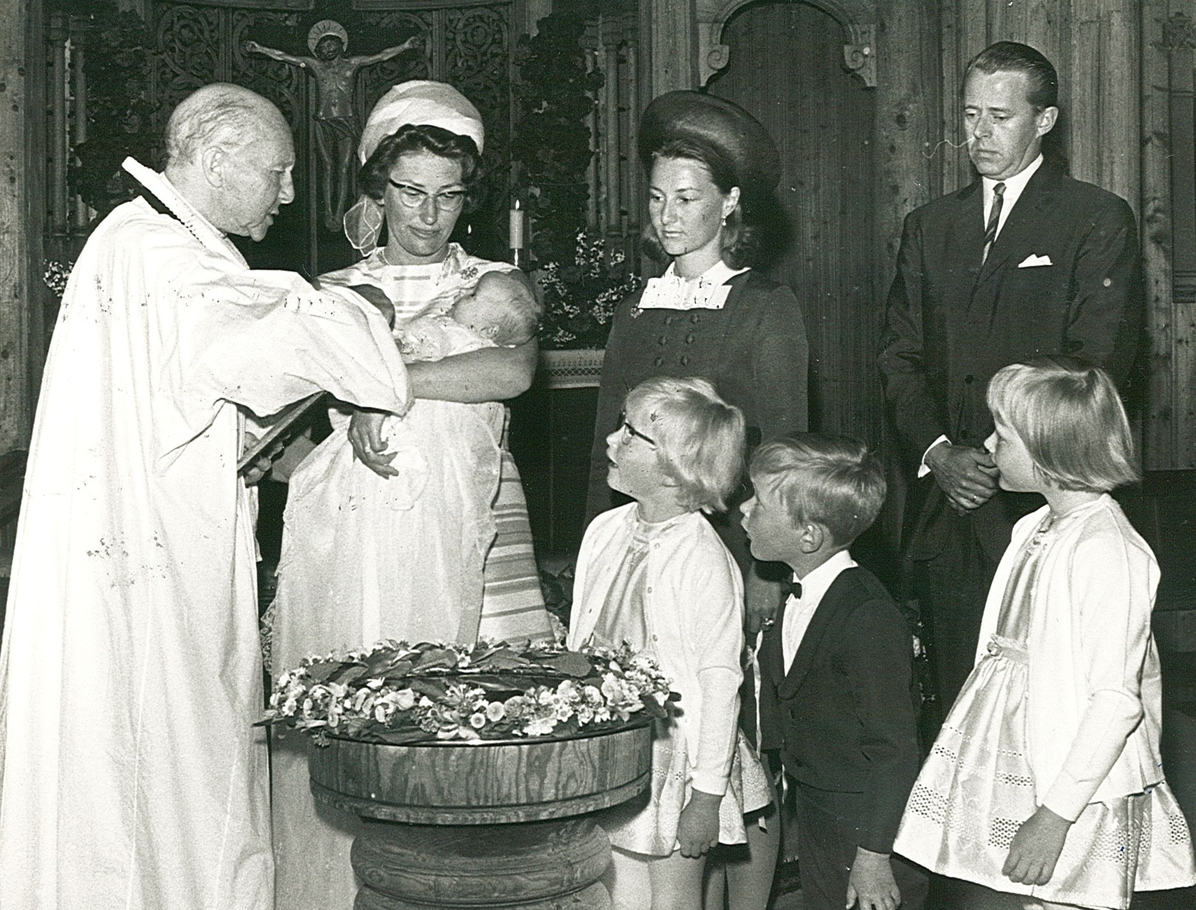
The baptism of Astrid and Ferner's fourth child, Elisabeth, 31 May 1969. The infant's godmother, Crown Princess Sonja, looks on.

Astrid married Johan Martin Ferner (1927–2015) on 12 January 1961 at Asker Church, Asker. They met when she hired him to sail her yacht in a race. The marriage faced opposition from the Church of Norway because Ferner had been previously married and divorced. After the wedding, she became known as Princess Astrid, Mrs Ferner (Norwegian: Prinsesse Astrid, fru Ferner), and ceased to receive the annual endowment of 50,000 Norwegian crowns that she had been granted. They had five children, seven grandchildren and, as of 2023, three great-grandchildren. The couple raised their family in Vinderen in a house given by her father.

- Cathrine Ferner (born 22 July 1962), married Arild Johansen (born 18 June 1961) on 9 December 1989. They have two children.
- Benedikte Ferner (born 27 September 1963), married firstly Rolf Woods (born 17 June 1963) on 30 April 1994. They divorced in 1998 and had no children. She married secondly Mons Einar Stange (born 26 May 1962) on 2 December 2000. They separated in 2002 and had no children.
- Alexander Ferner (born 15 March 1965), married Margrét Gudmundsdóttir (born 27 March 1966) on 27 July 1996. They have two children.
- Elisabeth Ferner (born 30 March 1969), married Tom Folke Beckmann (born 14 January 1963) on 3 October 1992. They have one son.
- Carl-Christian Ferner (born 22 October 1972), married Anna-Stina Slattum on 4 October 2014. They have two daughters.

== Later life and death ==
Astrid pictured in 2018

After raising her children, she and her husband moved to a condominium in Oslo which bordered Nordmarka.

In 2002, the government granted Astrid an honorary pension in recognition of her service to Norway, both during and after her years as first lady. In 2005, she took part in ceremonies marking the 60th anniversary of the end of the Second World War, including the unveiling of a plaque commemorating the Norwegian monarch's exile in London.

In February 2012, Astrid celebrated her 80th birthday with a private dinner at the Royal Palace in Oslo.

In March 2026, Astrid was hospitalised following a short illness and was therefore unable to attend the state visit to Norway by King Philippe and Queen Mathilde of Belgium. The Royal Palace stated that she required rest and recovery but did not initially release further details. According to media reports, her brother, King Harald V, and Queen Sonja visited her in a hospital in Oslo on 27 March. It was later confirmed that she was suffering from pneumonia. In May 2026, she was hospitalised again after carrying out a public engagement. She relied on the use of a wheelchair in her final months.

Astrid died on 11 September 2026, aged 94, two days after attending the state funeral of her brother King Harald V. Her funeral took place on 23 September at Ris Church in Oslo. Crown Princess Victoria of Sweden, Princess Astrid of Belgium and her husband Prince Lorenz, and siblings Prince Jean of Luxembourg and Princess Margaretha of Luxembourg and Liechtenstein attended her funeral.

== Patronages ==
Astrid was chair of the board of Crown Princess Märtha's Memorial Fund, which provides financial support to social and humanitarian initiatives carried out by non-governmental organisations.

She was a patron of several organisations with a focus on children and young people with dyslexia, having the condition herself.

- Foundation 3,14 – Gallery 3,14 (Hordaland International Art Gallery)
- The Norwegian Women's Public Health Association
- The Norwegian Women's and Family Association
- The Norwegian Women's Defence League
- Oslo Art Association
- The Norwegian Women's Voluntary Defence Association
- Inner Wheel Norway
- The Norwegian Dyslexia Association
- Dissimilis Norway
- Foreningen for Kroniske Smertepasienter ("The Norwegian Association of Chronic Pain Patients")
- Trondheim Symphony Orchestra

== Titles, styles and honours ==
Styles of Princess Astrid, Mrs. Ferner
- Reference style: Her Highness
- Spoken style: Your Highness

=== Titles ===
- 12 February 1932 – 12 January 1961: Her Royal Highness Princess Astrid of Norway
- 12 January 1961 – 11 September 2026: Her Highness Princess Astrid, Mrs. Ferner

=== Honours ===
Astrid was awarded the following orders and decorations:

==== National honours ====
- Norway: Grand Cross with Collar of the Royal Norwegian Order of Saint Olav
- Norway: Dame of the Royal Family Order of Haakon VII of Norway
- Norway: Dame of the Royal Family Order of King Olav V of Norway
- Norway: Dame of the Royal Family Order of King Harald V of Norway
- Norway: Recipient of the King Haakon VII Golden Jubilee Medal
- Norway: Recipient of the Medal of the 100th Anniversary of the Birth of King Haakon VII
- Norway: Recipient of the King Olav V Silver Jubilee Medal
- Norway: Recipient of the King Olav V Commemorative Medal
- Norway: Recipient of the Medal of the 100th Anniversary of the Birth of King Olav V
- Norway: Recipient of the Royal House Centenary Medal
- Norway: Recipient of the King Harald V Silver Jubilee Medal
- Norway: Recipient of the Holmenkollen Medal

==== Foreign honours ====
- Belgium: Knight Grand Cross of the Order of the Crown
- Finland: Grand Cross of the Order of the White Rose
- France: Grand Cross of the Order of Merit
- Germany: Grand Cross of the Order of Merit of the Federal Republic of Germany
- Iceland: Grand Cross of the Order of the Falcon
- Jordan: Knight Grand Cordon of the Order of the Star of Jordan
- Luxembourg: Knight Grand Cross of the Order of Adolphe of Nassau
- Netherlands: Knight Grand Cross of the Order of the House of Orange
- Portugal: Grand Cross of the Order of Merit
- Spain: Knight Grand Cross of the Royal Order of Isabella the Catholic
- Sweden: Member Grand Cross of the Royal Order of the Polar Star
- Sweden: Recipient of 90th Birthday Medal of King Gustav V
- Sweden: Recipient of 50th Birthday Medal of King Carl XVI Gustaf
- Thailand: Knight Grand Cordon of the Most Illustrious Order of Chula Chom Klao
- United Kingdom: Recipient of the Queen Elizabeth II Coronation Medal

== Honorific eponym ==
- Antarctica: Princess Astrid Coast

Princess Astrid of Norway House of Glücksburg Born: 12 February 1932 Died: 11 September 2026
Honorary titles
| Preceded by (Switzerland) Alfred Schläppi & Heinrich Schläppi | President of Organizing Committee for Winter Olympic Games; 1952; With: Haakon VII of Norway, Olaf Helset, House of Glücksburg | Succeeded by (Italy) Enrico Colli |
