= Gunnar Christie Wasberg =

Norwegian librarian and non-fiction writer

Gunnar Christie Wasberg (21 February 1923 – 27 January 2015) was a Norwegian historian, philosopher and first librarian at the University of Oslo Library.

== Biography ==
Wasberg was born in Brunlanes Municipality near Larvik in Vestfold, Norway. He took the doctorate (fil.dr.) at Uppsala University in 1963 with the thesis Forsvarstanke og suverenitetsprinsipp. From 1967 to 1989 he was the prime librarian at the University Library of Oslo. Wasberg held a guest professorship at University of Wisconsin, Madison. He also had other research engagement, and he was a guest lecturer, at a number of universities in Europe and in the United States.

Wasberg published about sixty books about history of ideas, political ideologies, industrial and maritime history, press history, military history, and local history (mainly about the Larvik district). In addition, he published many articles in domestic and foreign journals, congress papers, research reports and many articles and book reviews in newspapers, especially in the Norwegian newspaper Aftenposten.

He was a member of the Norwegian Academy for Language and Literature. Wasberg was a member of the Board (chairman 1987–88) in the Press History Archive, member of the Norwegian board of directors of the Association of Nordic Paper historians, member of the International Association of Paper Historians and member of the International de la Seconde Guerre Moniale. He was elected to the Carl Johans Förbundet at Uppsala and the Collegium Medievale Society for Medieval Studies. Wasberg was editor of Cursus Librorum, published by the University Library in Oslo (1960-1972) and editor of Norsk Slektshistorisk Tidsskrift (1975-1985).

He was an honorary member of the Nordic Paper History Association, Larvik and Omegns Museumsforening, Brunlanes Historielag, Lardal Historielag and Istituto del Sarco Romano Impero. Gunnar Christie Wasberg received the King's Medal of Merit (Kongens fortjenstemedalje) in gold in 2007.

== Selected work ==
- Historiens myte og filosofi (1955)
- Historiens problemer på nye premisser (1956)
- Philosophy of history. Its characteristics and limitations (1956)
- Om forholdet mellom erkjennelseform og verdianskuelse i historiefilosofien (1958)
- Femti år i konkurranse of fremgang. Tønsberg Hvalfangeri (1958)
- Aftenposten i hundre år: 1860-1960 (1960)
- Norske forskningsbibliotekarers forening (1962)
- Bibliotek og samfunn (1963)
- Larvik historie bind III (1963)
- Historien om 1814 (1964)
- Ideer og politikk(1965)
- Standard telefon og kabelfabrikk 50 år (1965)
- Norge 1940-45 Dokumenter i utvalg (1965)
- The philosophy of history and the problem of synthesis of knowledge (1965)
- Med norsk trelast til nasjonal velstand (1967)
- Oslo Lysverker 1892-1967 (1967)
- Den annen verdenskrig: en kort oversikt (1967)
- Scandinavia: Boundaries and Peoples (1967)
- Sandar bygdebok, bind 1 bygdehistorie (1968)
- Oslo Electricity Works (1968)
- Norsk militærhistorisk bibliografi (1968)
- Industriens historie i Norge (1969)
- Norsk presse i hundre år (1969)
- Brunlanes En bygdebok, Bind 1 Bygdehistorie (1970)
- Fellesbanken a.s. 1920-1970 (1970)
- Folk og skjebner i grevens by (1970)
- Larvik 300 år (1971)
- Fearnley & Eger (1971)
- I takt med Europa (1973)
- Oslo - fra kaupang til storby (1973)
- Lardal Bygdebok Bind II (1973)
- Oslo Sjøfartsbyen (1974)
- Om murene kunne tale - Styrvoll kirke gjennom 800 år (1975)
- Ett med sin by, Larvik kirke 300 år (1976)
- Hasle-Økern gjennom titusen år (1976)
- Lardal Bygdebok Bind III (1976)
- Vi på Agnes i to tusen år (1977)
- Stavern - Fredriksvern - Stavern (1978)
- Lardal Bygdebok Bind I (1978)
- Brunlanes Bygdebok Bind 2 (1979)
- Larvik Havns Historie (1980)
- Møllhausen, En norsk håndverkerslekt med europeiske aner (1981)
- Stavern fort - Citadell-øya (1981)
- Sakførere 1848-1905 1 A og B, Den norske advokatforening (1982)
- A/S Sætre kjeksfabrikk 1883-1983 (1983)
- Advokaten - rettens og samfunnets tjener (1983)
- Esso 90 år i Norge, 1893 - 1983 (1983)
- Papier, Presse und Politik in Norwegen im 19 Jahrhundert (1984)
- ABC i sleksgranskning (1985)
- Oslo handel gjennom tusen år (1985)
- Utsyn og overblikk (1985)
- Landeveien over Skagerak, A/S Larvik-Fredrikshavnferjen (1986)
- Oslo Electricity works (1986)
- Historiens mesterprøve, Norges Håndverkerforbund 1886 - 1986 (1986)
- Handel i Vestfold - Fra istid til kunnskapsalder (1987)
- Handel i Østfold. Fra steinalder til informasjonsepoke (1987)
- Næring-senteret med hovedstadfunksjon (1988)
- Rørlegghåndverket i Norge, Historie og organisasjon (1988)
- Hvit og blå i 125 år (1990)
- 150 år i papir, Carl Emil A/S, 1840-1990 (1990)
- Fredriksvern flåtestasjon og verftet (1990)
- En arv som forplikter, Larvik og Omegns Museumsforening 1916-1991 (1991)
- Tre: Bærebjelken i vår historie (1992)
- Norge-Europa 1992-1492: Eksport, import og kulturimpulser i et handelshistorisk perspektiv (1992)
- Møllhausen - En norsk håndverkerslekt (1993)
- Stavern - Strandstedet - byen (1994)
- Fra kornmagasin til pengehusholning og sparebank (1994)
- Med Numedalslågen som akse (1995)
- Larvik-slekten Bugge: Magnus-gren (1995)
- Larviks Profilene, Utgitt av Larvik og Omegn Museumsforening (1997)
- Fagpressen i Norge (1998)
- Med Skagerak som nabo, Det nasjonale aldershjem for sjømenn i Stavern, Historisk bakgrunn, opprinnelse og utvikling (1998)
- Christiania-slekten Hansson (1999)
- Magiske Mølen (2000)
- Kirker i Svarstad - Lardal gjenneom tusen år (2001)

== Other sources ==
- Gustavsen, Are S. «Fil.dr. Gunnar Christie Wasberg 1923–2015», obituary, Genealogen 1/2015 pp. 47–49.
