= Fridtjov Søiland Birkeli =

Norwegian Lutheran missionary, writer, magazine editor and bishop

The Right Reverend Doctor Fridtjov Søiland Birkeli
- Bishop of Oslo; Primate of the Church of Norway
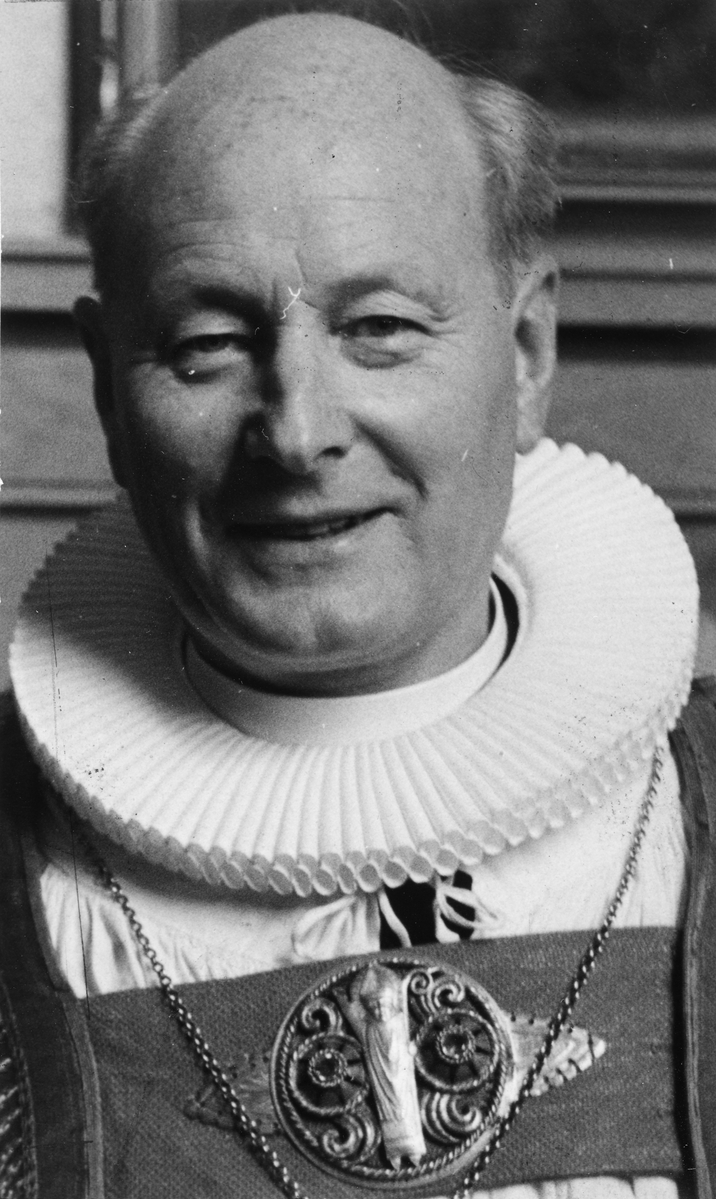
- Church: Church of Norway
- Diocese: Stavanger and Oslo
- Appointed: 1960
- In office: 1960–1968 (Stavanger); 1968–1973 (Oslo); 1968–1972 (Preses)

Orders
- Ordination: 1930
- Consecration: 1960

Personal details
- Born: 26 May 1906 Tuléar, French Madagascar
- Died: 17 September 1983 (aged 77) Oslo, Norway
- Denomination: Christian
- Parents: Emil Otto Birkeli and Olene Søiland
- Spouse: Borghild Sofie Sandbæk
- Occupation: Priest
- Education: MF Norwegian School of Theology (Cand.theol., 1930)

Fridtjov Søiland Birkeli (26 May 1906 – 17 September 1983) was a Norwegian Lutheran missionary, writer, magazine editor, and bishop. He also served in the administration of the Lutheran World Federation.

== Biography ==
Fridtjov Birkeli was born on 26 May 1906 in Tuléar on the island of Madagascar in what was then French Madagascar. He was raised at the Norwegian missionary children's home in Stavanger from 1912 to 1919 while his parents worked in Madagascar as missionaries. He went to school in Stavanger and received his diploma in 1925. He went on to the MF Norwegian School of Theology in Oslo and he got his Cand.theol. degree in 1930.

After studying the French language in Paris, he was ordained as a missionary priest by Bishop Johan Lunde of Oslo in 1933. He worked as a missionary to French Madagascar from 1933 to 1944. While there, he also taught at the Lutheran seminary in Fianarantsoa from 1937 to 1944. He got seriously ill in 1944, spent about a year recovering in Durban in South Africa, and then he went home to Norway in 1945. After returning to Norway, he edited the periodical Norsk Misjonstidende from 1948 to 1954. He received his Doctor of Theology degree in 1953.

In 1954, he moved to Geneva and became the director of the missions department at the Lutheran World Federation. He held this job until 1957 when he moved back to Norway to become the general secretary of the Norwegian Missionary Society. In 1960, he was appointed to be the Bishop of the Diocese of Stavanger based at the Stavanger Cathedral. In 1968, he was appointed to be the Bishop of the Diocese of Oslo. While he was Bishop of Oslo, he had the honor of performing the marriage ceremony of Crown Prince Harald and Sonja Haraldsen in 1968. Also during this time, he was the president of the Church of Norway Bishop's Conference. He retired in 1973 after 40 years of service to God. Birkeli died on 17 September 1983 in Oslo, Norway.

== Resignation ==
The circumstances around Birkeli's resignation in 1973 were revealed nearly thirty years later. The bishops collegium received a letter with accusations, as part of a blackmail, regarding the fact that Birkeli had secretly resumed a relationship with a girlfriend from his youth days. The bishops concluded that Birkeli ought to resign from his position as front figure of the Church of Norway as soon as possible, before an eventual revelation in the media.

Religious titles
Preceded by Karl Martinussen	Bishop of Stavanger; 1960–1968	Succeeded by Olav Hagesæther
Preceded by Johannes Smemo	Bishop of Oslo; 1968–1973	Succeeded by Kaare Støylen
Preceded by Johannes Smemo	Preses of the Church of Norway; 1968–1973	Succeeded by Kaare Støylen
