= Royal Family Order of Olav V =

Norwegian royal decoration

Royal Family Order of Olav V; Kong Olav Vs Husorden
- Type: Royal Family Order
- Established: 1958
- Eligibility: at the monarch's pleasure
- Status: Not awarded since the death of Olav V
- Sovereign: Olav V
- Ribbon of the Order

The Royal Family Order of Olav V (Norwegian: Kong Olav Vs Husorden) is a decoration awarded to female members of the Norwegian royal family. It was established in 1958 and has not been awarded since the death of King Olav V.

The ribbon of the Order was red, bordered in blue with a white fimbriation.

== List of recipients ==
Deceased members

- Princess Ragnhild, Mrs. Lorentzen (sister of Harald V; died in 2012).
- Princess Astrid, Mrs. Ferner (sister of Harald V; died in 2026).

Living members

- Queen Sonja of Norway
- Princess Märtha Louise of Norway

== See also ==
- Royal Family Order of Haakon VII
- Royal Family Order of Harald V
- Orders, decorations, and medals of Norway

== Bibliography ==
- Tom Bergroth: «Royal Portrait Badges», i Guy Stair Sainty og Rafal Heydel-Mankoo: World Orders of Knighthood and Merit, første bind, Buckingham: Burke's Peerage, 2006, p. 829
- Dag T. Hoelseth: «The Norwegian Royal House Orders», i Guy Stair Sainty og Rafal Heydel-Mankoo: World Orders of Knighthood and Merit, første bind, Buckingham: Burke's Peerage, 2006, p. 815
- Lars Stevnsborg: Kongeriget Danmarks ordener, medaljer og hederstegn. Kongeriget Islands ordener og medaljer, Syddansk Universitetsforlag, 2005, p. 199–212
