= Royal Family Order of Haakon VII =

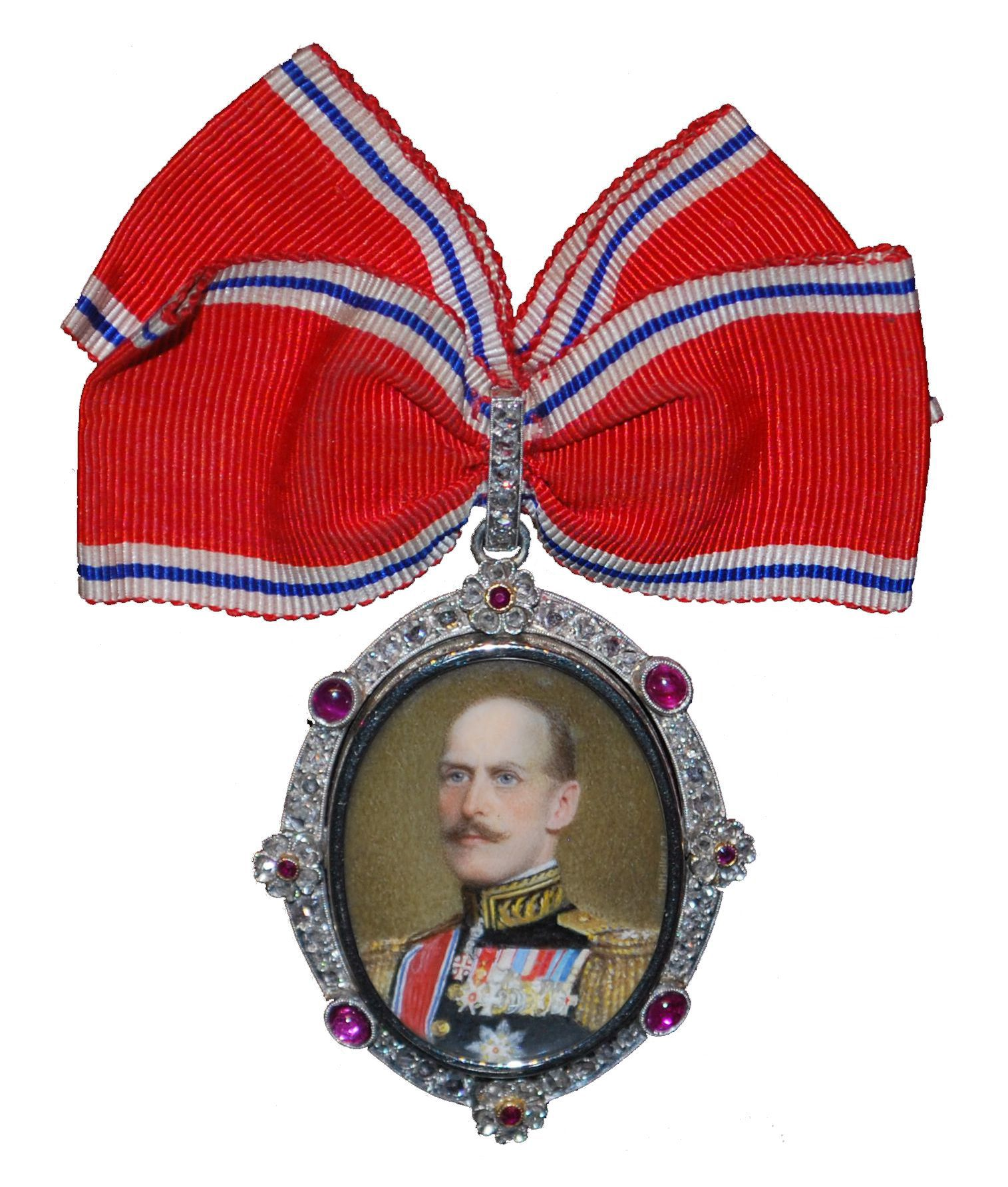
- Insignia

Awarded by King Haakon VII
- Type: Royal Family Order
- Country: Norway
- Eligibility: Female members of the Norwegian royal family
- Criteria: At His Majesty's pleasure
- Status: Defunct; not awarded since the death of Haakon VII
- Sovereign: Haakon VII
- Ribbon of the Order

The Royal Family Order of King Haakon VII (in Norwegian: Kong Haakon VIIs Husorden) is an honorary distinction instituted by Haakon VII, who reigned as King of Norway from 1905 to 1957. The oder was personally awarded by the King to female members of the Norwegian royal family as a formal recognition of their dedication, service, and steadfast loyalty to the Crown.

Princess Astrid, Mrs. Ferner was the last surviving recipient of the order until her death in 2026.

== Appearance ==
The insignia of the Order comprises a portrait of King Haakon VII, set within an ornate frame embellished with precious stones. The miniature is suspended from a silk ribbon of scarlet red, bordered in blue with a white fimbriation.

== List of recipients ==
The Order was conferred upon the following members of the Norwegian Royal House:

- Queen Maud of Norway (wife of King Haakon VII; d. 1938);
- Crown Princess Märtha of Norway (daughter-in-law of King Haakon and spouse of Olav V; d. 1954);
- Princess Ragnhild, Mrs. Lorentzen (granddaughter of King Haakon; d. 2012);
- Princess Astrid, Mrs. Ferner (granddaughter of King Haakon; d. 2026).

== See also ==
- Royal Family Order of Olav V
- Royal Family Order of Harald V
- Orders, decorations, and medals of Norway
