= Royal Family Order of Harald V =

Royal service decoration in Norway

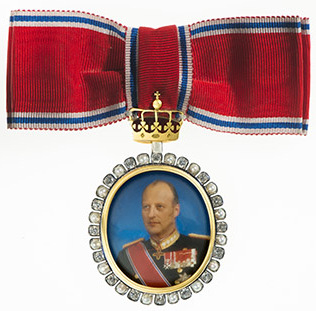
- Insignia

Awarded by King Harald V
- Type: Royal Family Order
- Country: Norway
- Eligibility: Female members of the Norwegian royal family
- Criteria: At His Majesty's pleasure
- Status: Not awarded since the death of Harald V
- Sovereign: Harald V

Statistics
- First induction: 1991
- Last induction: 2022
- Ribbon of the Order

The Royal Family Order of Harald V (in Norwegian: Kong Harald Vs Husorden) is an order that was instituted following the accession of Harald V to the throne in 1991, upholding the Norwegian monarchical tradition of honouring members of the Royal Family. This decoration was bestowed exclusively upon female members of the Royal House, serving as formal recognition for their service and the official duties performed on behalf of the Monarchy and the State.

== Appearance ==
The insignia of the order consist of a portrait of Harald V, depicted in middle age, framed by a border of diamonds. The piece is suspended from a red ribbon with blue edges fimbriated in white. Unlike other standardised decorations, the decorative design of the jewelled frame is unique to each recipient, varying between the different examples bestowed.

== List of recipients ==
The Order has been bestowed upon the following members of the Norwegian Royal Family:

=== Deceased members ===
- Princess Ragnhild, Mrs. Lorentzen (sister of Harald V; died in 2012).
- Princess Astrid, Mrs. Ferner (sister of Harald V; died in 2026).

=== Living members ===
- Queen Sonja of Norway (wife of Harald V);
- Queen Mette-Marit of Norway (daughter-in-law of Harald V and wife of Haakon VIII);
- Princess Märtha Louise of Norway (daughter of Harald V);
- Ingrid Alexandra, Crown Princess of Norway (granddaughter of Harald V and daughter of Haakon VIII).
- Ingegjerd Løvenskiold (Mistress of the Robes to Queen Sonja)

== Gallery ==
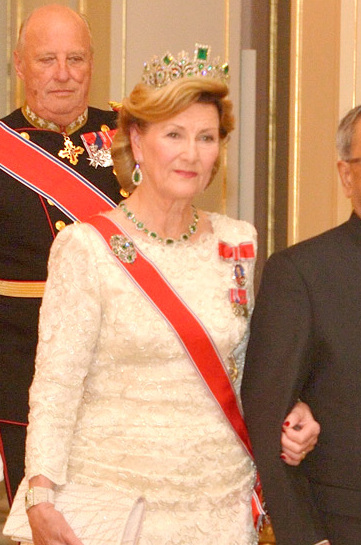
Queen Sonja wearing her insignia, 2014

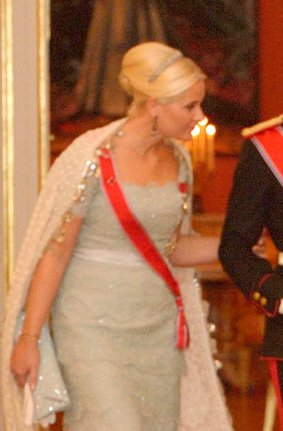
Queen Mette-Marit wearing her insignia, 2014 as Crown Princess

Crown Princess Ingrid Alexandra wearing her insignia, 2026

== See also ==
- Royal Family Order of Haakon VII
- Royal Family Order of Olav V
- Orders, decorations, and medals of Norway
