= Fredrik Engelstad =

Norwegian sociologist

- Born: March 12, 1944 (age 82)
- Scientific career
- Fields: Sociology

Fredrik Engelstad (born 12 March 1944) is a Norwegian sociologist. He has written several books.

He is the son of writer Carl Fredrik Engelstad and physician Vibeke Engelstad, and a nephew of archivist Sigurd Engelstad. He is married to professor Irene Johnson.

Engelstad earned the mag.art. degree in 1974 and the dr.philos. degree in 1989. He was director of the Norwegian Institute for Social Research from 1986 to 2007. From 1990 to 2007 he held a part-time position as Professor of Sociology at the University of Oslo. He became a full-time Professor of Sociology at the University of Oslo in 2008 and became professor emeritus in 2014.

He has been a visiting fellow at Yale University (1981), the University of California, Berkeley (1993), the University of Chicago (1996) and the Northwestern University (2006).

== Honours ==
- Member of the Royal Norwegian Society of Sciences and Letters, 2009
- Honorary Prize of the Norwegian Sociological Association, 2004

== Selected works ==
- Fredrik Engelstad, ed. (1999) Om makt. Teori og kritikk. Oslo: AdNotam Gyldendal
- Fredrik Engelstad, Carl Erik Grenness, Ragnvald Kalleberg and Raino Malnes (1998), Samfunn og vitenskap. Oslo: AdNotam Gyldendal
- Fredrik Engelstad (1992), Kjærlighetens irrganger. Sinn og samfunn i Bjørnsons og Ibsens diktning. Oslo: Gyldendal
- Fredrik Engelstad (1990), Likhet og styring. Deltakerdemokratiet på prøve. Oslo: Universitetsforlaget
- Dag Østerberg and Fredrik Engelstad (1992), Samfunnsformasjonen. 3. edition. Oslo: Pax
