= Carl Erik Grenness =

Norwegian professor of psychology (born 1939)

Carl-Erik Grenness (born 18 November 1939) is a Norwegian professor of psychology.

Grenness has spent most of his career as a Professor at the University of Oslo, and has been active in many aspects of psychology, including philosophical psychology, behavioural analysis, organisational psychology and organisational studies. He was also a scientist at the Forsvarets institutt for ledelse, and has worked as head psychologist at Forsvaret.

== Bibliography (selected) ==
- 1963: Metapsykologi (with Steinar Kvale)
- 1996: Samfunn og Vitenskap (with Engelstad, F., Kalleberg, R. and Malnes, R. Ad Notam, Oslo
- 2004: Kommunikasjon i organisasjoner: innføring i kommunikasjonsteori og kommunikasjonsteknikker Abstrakt ISBN 978-82-7935-004-0
- 2004: Hva er PSYKOLOGI ISBN 978-82-15-00569-0
- 2005: Introduksjon til samfunnsfag - Vitenskapsteori, argumentasjon og faghistorie (with Fredrik Engelstad, Ragnvald Kalleberg and Raino Malnes) ISBN 978-82-05-31154-1
