= Erling Utnem =

Norwegian bishop and translator (1920–2006)

Right Reverend Erling Utnem
- Bishop
- Church: Church of Norway
- Diocese: Diocese of Agder
- Appointed: 1973
- In office: 1973–1983

Personal details
- Born: 7 February 1920 Hedrum, Vestfold, Norway
- Died: 11 November 2006 (aged 86) Kristiansand, Norway
- Denomination: Evangelical-Lutheran
- Occupation: bishop

Erling Gudmann Utnem (7 February 1920–11 November 2006) was a Norwegian theologian, priest, and Bible translator. He was the Bishop of the Diocese of Agder from 1973 until his retirement in 1983. Utnem was one of the founders of the international Lausanne Movement. He was Bible translator and he wrote several books. He was also known for his combination of an evangelical line with a clear social commitment.

== Personal life ==
Utnem was born on 7 February 1920 in Hedrum Municipality (in present-day Larvik Municipality) in Vestfold county, Norway. He died on 11 November 2006 at the Sørlandet Hospital Kristiansand in Kristiansand Municipality. His funeral was at Kristiansand Cathedral on 16 November 2006 and he was buried there too.

== Education and career ==
Utnem received his cand.theol. degree in 1947. His first job was as a travel secretary for the Norwegian Christian Student and School Association from 1948-1953. Then he became a teacher; first at the Inner Mission Society Bible School in Oslo (1953–1955) and then at the Missionary School in Stavanger (1955–1967). In 1967, he was called to his first job as a priest. He was the resident chaplain in Sarpsborg from 1967 until 1970. He was called to be rector of the practical theology seminary at the MF Norwegian School of Theology in Oslo in 1970. Just three years later, in 1973, he was appointed to be the Bishop of the Diocese of Agder, based at the Kristiansand Cathedral. He held the job of bishop for ten years. He resigned in 1983 after having had two major heart attacks.

== Works ==
- Visst skal jorden bli ny! (1987)

Religious titles
Preceded by Kaare Støylen	Bishop of Agder; 1973–1983	Succeeded by Halvor Bergan
