= Johannes Smemo =

Norwegian theologian, psalmist and bishop

The Right Reverend Johannes Smemo
- Bishop of Oslo; Primate of the Church of Norway
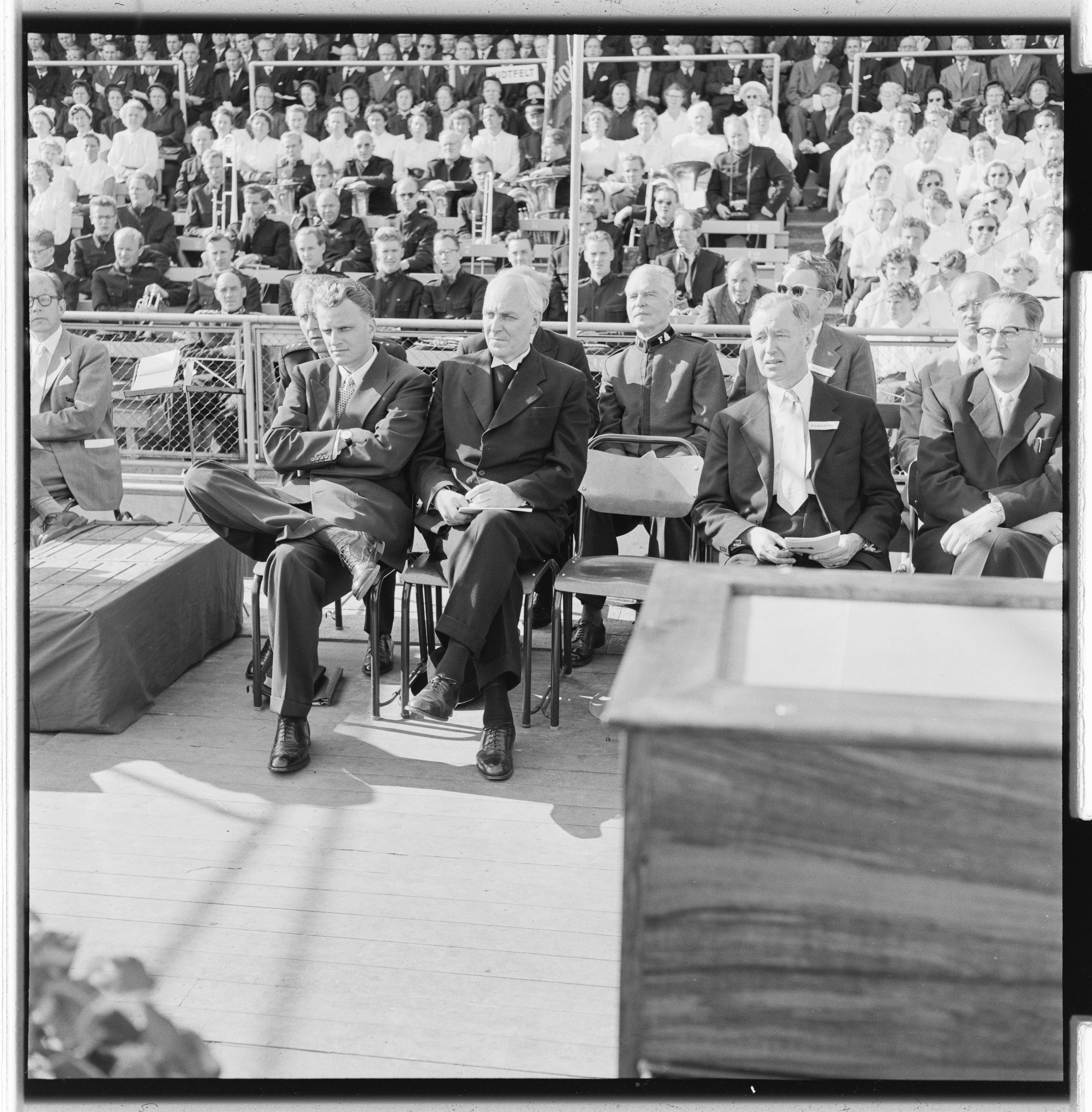
- From left Billy Graham and Johannes Smemo (1955)
- Church: Church of Norway
- Diocese: Diocese of Agder; Diocese of Oslo
- Appointed: 1946
- In office: 1946–1951 (Agder); 1951-1968 (Oslo)
- Other post: Primate of the Church of Norway

Personal details
- Born: 31 July 1898 Røros Municipality, Sør-Trøndelag, Norway
- Died: 7 March 1973 (aged 74) Oslo, Norway
- Buried: Vår Frelsers gravlund, Oslo
- Denomination: Christian
- Occupation: Priest
- Education: Cand.theol.
- Alma mater: MF Norwegian School of Theology

Johannes Smemo (31 July 1898 – 7 March 1973) was a Norwegian theologian, psalmist, and a long-time bishop in the Church of Norway. Theologically, he was a conservative, confessional Lutheran priest who lived during the time of great liberal-conservative debates within the Church of Norway.

== Personal life ==
Smemo was born on 31 July 1898 at Rugldalen in Røros Municipality in Sør-Trøndelag county, Norway. He was born to a railroad foreman John Smemo and teacher Mali Grytbak. He grew up in Åsen Municipality. In 1929, he married Marie (“Bissen”) Bjønness-Jacobsen, the daughter of Mikkel Bjønness-Jacobsen. Smemo is the father-in-law of Paul Thyness. He died in Oslo, Norway on 7 March 1973 and he is buried at the Vår Frelsers gravlund in Oslo.

He was a Commander with star of the Norwegian Order of St. Olav and a Commander 1st class of the Swedish Order of the Polar Star. He received a gold King Haakon VII Commemorative Medal for his work at the funeral of the Norwegian King. Smemo received an honorary Doctor of Theology degree from Luther Seminary in St. Paul, Minnesota in the United States.

== Education and career ==
Education was important in his family as he was growing up. Many in the family were teachers, so books, music and living Christianity were part of his everyday life. He first went to the "Fredly kristelige ungdomsskole" (a Christian elementary school) in Børsa. At that school in 1914-1915 he has a religious breakthrough and accepted Christ as his savior. Later he went to school in Volda in 1916, followed by attending the Trondheim Cathedral School, where he took his examen artium in 1919. He immediately went on to the Norwegian School of Theology in Oslo where he received a Cand.theol. degree in 1924.

He began his career as an assistant priest at Bragernes Church in Drammen Municipality from 1925 until 1933. He then moved on to be the parish priest for Sør-Fron Municipality for one year from 1933 until 1934. Then, in 1934, he was hired as the rector at the Norwegian School of Theology in Oslo, a position he held through the war years. During this time he was the editor of the Luthersk Kirketidende newspaper from 1938 until 1946. He played an active role in the leadership of the Church's resistance movement during the Occupation of Norway by Nazi Germany. For this reason, he was imprisoned at the Berg concentration camp from 11 November 1944 until the end of the war in May 1945.

After the war in 1946, he was appointed to be the Bishop of the Diocese of Agder. He held that position at the Kristiansand Cathedral until 1951 when he was appointed to be the Bishop of the Diocese of Oslo. He also chaired the psalm commission of the Church of Norway from 1954 to 1968. As Bishop of Oslo, he officiated at the funerals for Crown Princess Märtha (in 1954) and King Haakon VII (in 1957), both at the Oslo Cathedral. He also gave the sermon at the consecration ceremony for the new King Olav V in 1958 at the Nidaros Cathedral in Trondheim. Smemo remained Bishop of Oslo from 1951 until his retirement in 1968.

== Works ==
Bishop Smemo wrote several theological books during his time as priest, seminary rector, and bishop. He also wrote and translated several books of psalms and hymns, and he was part of the commission that edited the Church of Norway hymnbook that was presented in the 1960s.

- Kjærligheten hos troens apostel (1926)
- Er prekenens tid forbi? (1938)
- Livet ovenfra (1940)
- Guds ja (1954)
- Kirkesituasjonen. Om bekjennelseskirke og statskirke (1954)
- Salmer fra søsterkirker (1964)
- Gamle salmer og nye (1965)
- Ung sang (1967)

Church of Norway titles
Preceded by James Maroni	Bishop of Agder; 1947–1951	Succeeded by Johannes Smidt
Preceded by Eivind Berggrav	Bishop of Oslo; 1951–1968	Succeeded by Fridtjov Søiland Birkeli
Preceded by Eivind Berggrav	Preses of the Church of Norway; 1951–1968	Succeeded by Fridtjov Søiland Birkeli
