= James Maroni =

Norwegian bishop

Right Reverend James Maroni
- Bishop
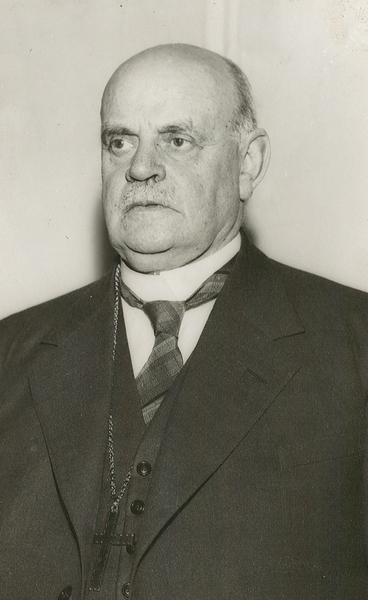
- Church: Church of Norway
- Diocese: Diocese of Agder
- Appointed: 1930
- In office: 1930–1947
- Predecessor: Bernt Støylen
- Successor: Johannes Smemo

Personal details
- Born: 15 June 1873 Kristiansand, Norway
- Died: 12 July 1957 (aged 84) Oslo, Norway
- Denomination: Christian
- Occupation: Priest

James Maroni (15 June 1873 – 12 July 1957) was a Norwegian theologian and priest in the Church of Norway. From 1930 until 1947 he served as the Bishop of the Norwegian Diocese of Agder.

== Personal life ==
James Maroni was born on 15 June 1873 in Kristiansand in Vest-Agder county in southern Norway. His parents were shipbuilder Nikolai Ambrosius Maroni and his wife Maria Catharina Weisser. He was married to Wilhelmine ("Willik") Margrethe Bang in 1904 in Drammen, Norway. Maroni's father is descended from an ancient Italian family from Florence who had immigrated to Norway in the 18th century. His mother came from a family that was originally from Holstein (now in Germany).

== Career ==
Maroni was educated at the cathedral school in Kristiansand, finishing his examen artium in 1894. Following that, he studied theology and received his Cand.theol. degree in 1898. James Maroni was ordained in 1899. His first job was as a curate at the Bragernes Church in Drammen from 1899 until 1904. He then was a priest in the Vaterland Church in Kristiania from 1905 until 1913. Next, he became a curate at the Vår Frelsers Church in Kristiania. He worked there from 1913 until 1926 when he became the dean of the Kristiania deanery. In 1930, he was appointed to be the Bishop of the Diocese of Agder. During the occupation of Norway by Nazi Germany, he took part in the clandestine "temporary" leadership of the Church of Norway after he resigned his "official" position to protest the Nazi government in Norway. During this time, the government required him to check in with police twice a day and he was under a speech ban. After the war, he resumed his job as an official Bishop of Agder. He continued on as bishop until his retirement in 1947. After that time, he returned to Oslo to live until his death in 1957.

== Works and honors ==
Among his publications are Herrens bord (1919), Stiftsprovst Gustav Jensen (1923), and the sermon collection Den store glede (1950). He was awarded several honors during his lifetime including being made a Commander of the Danish aOrder of the Dannebrog, a Knight of the Swedish Order of the Polar Star, and the Badge of Honour from the Norwegian Red Cross.

Church of Norway titles
Preceded by Bernt Støylen	Bishop of Agder; 1930–1947	Succeeded by Johannes Smemo
