= Carl Fredrik Engelstad =

Norwegian writer, journalist, translator and theatre director

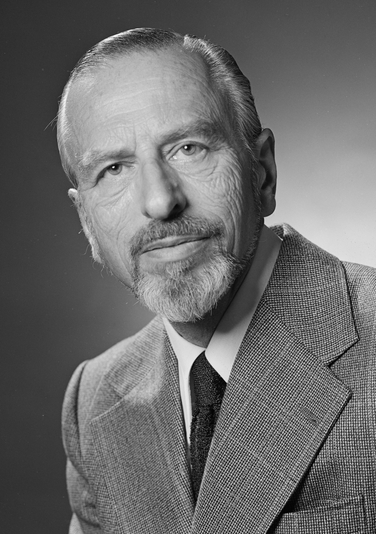
- Engelstad in 1977
- Born: 11 November 1915; Hadsel, Norway
- Died: 1 October 1996 (aged 80)
- Occupations: Writer, playwright, journalist, translator and theatre director.
- Spouse: Vibeke Engelstad
- Children: Fredrik Engelstad
- Relatives: Sigurd Engelstad (brother); Kristian Smidt (brother-in-law)
- Awards: Bastian Prize; Norwegian Critics Prize for Literature; Riksmål Society Literature Prize

Carl Johan Fredrik Engelstad (11 November 1915 – 1 October 1996) was a Norwegian writer, playwright, journalist, translator and theatre director.

== Personal life ==
Engelstad was born in Hadsel Municipality as the son of jurist Sigurd Engelstad (1878–1916) and younger brother of archivist Sigurd Engelstad.

He married Vibeke Engelstad, a physician. Their son Fredrik became a professor of sociology, and married professor Irene Johnson.

== Career ==
Carl Fredrik Engelstad was hired as a theatre critic in Morgenbladet in 1945. He stayed here until 1960, the last two years as cultural editor. He was theatre director for Nationaltheatret from 1960 to 1961, and from 1965 he worked in Aftenposten. He was known for writing from a Christian viewpoint.

From 1946 to 1949 he also edited the periodical Spektrum. He debuted as a writer in 1949, with two plays. His novels included Gjester i mørket (1958), Størst blant dem (1977) and De levendes land (1986). For the two latter novels, Engelstad was awarded the Norwegian Critics Prize for Literature. He also wrote books about Francis of Assisi, Ronald Fangen, Ludvig Holberg and Johan Herman Wessel, among others.

=== Awards ===
- Norwegian Critics Prize for Literature 1977, 1986
- Riksmål Society Literature Prize 1986

Cultural offices
Preceded by Knut Hergel	Director of the National Theatre; 1960–1961	Succeeded by Erik Kristen-Johanssen
Awards
Preceded by Kjell Risvik	Recipient of the Bastian Prize; 1976	Succeeded by Erik Gunnes
