= Johannes Smidt =

Norwegian theologian and priest

Right Reverend Johannes Smidt
- Bishop
- Church: Church of Norway
- Diocese: Diocese of Agder
- Appointed: 1951
- In office: 1951–1957
- Predecessor: Johannes Smemo
- Successor: Kaare Støylen

Personal details
- Born: 19 November 1887 Herad Municipality, Norway
- Died: 15 May 1973 (aged 85) Oslo, Norway
- Buried: Ullern Church, Oslo
- Denomination: Christian
- Children: Vibeke Engelstad; Kristian Smidt
- Occupation: Priest

Johannes Smidt (19 November 1887 – 15 May 1973) was a Norwegian theologian and priest in the Church of Norway. He served as the Bishop of the Diocese of Agder from 1951 until 1957.

== Personal life ==
Smidt was born on 19 November 1887 in Herad Municipality in the far southern part of Norway. He was the son of the priest, Edvard Dahl Smidt and his wife Valborg Hannestad. In 1914, Smidt married Jofrid Grimstvedt. He died on 15 May 1973 in Oslo, Norway and he was buried on 21 May 1973 at the Ullern Church where he worked for many years. His daughter is Vibeke Engelstad and his son is Kristian Smidt.

== Education and career ==
Smidt graduated with a cand.theol. degree in 1912. He was the secretary for the Norges kristelige studentforbund (Norwegian Christian Student Union) from 1912 until 1914. He then got a job as an assistant priest in Sandefjord from 1914 until 1923. In 1923, he moved to London to be a priest for the Norwegian Seamen's Church. In 1934, he moved back to Norway to Ullern in Oslo to be a curate (1934–1946) and then he was promoted to the parish priest (1946–1951). He worked there until 1951 when he was appointed to be the bishop of the Diocese of Agder after the retirement of Bishop Johannes Smemo. He retired in 1957 at the age of 70 and he was replaced by Kaare Støylen. He was made a commander of the Order of St. Olav upon his retirement.

== Works ==
- Bli med! (1919, new editions in 1937 and 1946)
- Vor arv (1922, new edition in 1945)
- Fotefar (1927)
- Hvad vi gjør for vore sjømænd i fremmede havner (1931, with Thorvald Kjerland)
- Det hender i dag (1936)
- Fredsfyrsten (1945)
- Konflikter i ekteskapet (1948, new edition in 1961)
- Lov om trossamfunn sett fra kirkelig synspunkt (1962)
- Hva livet har lært meg (1972)

Religious titles
Preceded by Johannes Smemo	Bishop of Agder; 1951–1957	Succeeded by Kaare Støylen
