= Sigurd Engelstad =

Norwegian genealogist and archivist

Sigurd Engelstad (2 August 1914 – 16 January 2006) was a Norwegian genealogist and archivist.

Engelstad was born in Hadsel Municipality in Nordland county, Norway. He was the son of jurist Sigurd Engelstad (1878–1916) and older brother of writer Carl Fredrik Engelstad. Through Carl Fredrik, Sigurd was the uncle of professor Fredrik Engelstad.

Sigurd Engelstad published several genealogical works, and was a co-editor of the journal Norsk slektshistorisk tidsskrift from 1960 to 1975. From 1979 to 1983 he served as deputy archivist (førstearkivar) at the National Archival Services of Norway.
