= Eivind Stenersen Engelstad =

Norwegian archaeologist and art historian

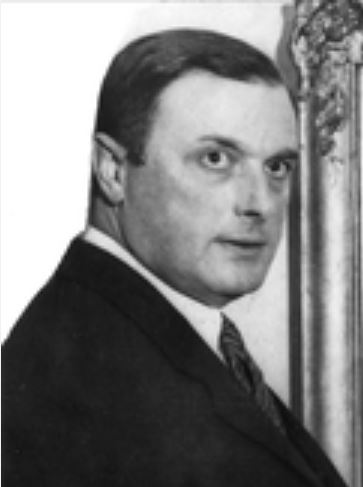
- Eivind Stenersen Engelstad
- Born: 21 June 1900
- Died: 16 February 1969 (aged 68)
- Spouse: Helen Wright
- Scientific career
- Fields: Archaeology, Art history

Eivind Stenersen Engelstad (21 June 1900 – 16 February 1969) was a Norwegian archaeologist and art historian.

== Personal life ==
Engelstad was born in Kristiania as the son of jurist Bjarne Engelstad (1872–1939) and grandson of engineer Jess Julius Engelstad (1822–1896). He was married to Danish born art historian Helen Wright.

== Career ==
Eivind Stenersen Engelstad took the dr.philos. degree in 1934 on the thesis Østnorske ristninger og malinger av den arktiske gruppe. Other publications include the art historic Senmiddelalderens kunst i Norge ca. 1400–1535 (1936) and Kunstindustrien (1950).

In 1948 he was hired as assistant keeper at the Norwegian Museum of Cultural History. From 1953 he was the Public Director of Museums, a post abolished when he left in 1960. From 1960 to 1967 he was the director of the Norwegian Museum of Decorative Arts and Design.
