= Jess Julius Engelstad =

Norwegian engineer and railroad administrator

Jess Julius Engelstad (1822 – 1896) was a Norwegian engineer and railroad administrator.

Engelstad was born in Christiania as the son of customs surveyor Christopher Engelstad (1786–1835). He was the grandfather of museum director Eivind Stenersen Engelstad (1900–1969).

An engineer by education, Engelstad oversaw the construction of numerous bridges during the 1850s, including Nygårdsbroen, Sarpebrua and Fossum Bridge. From 1859 to 1896 he was the manager of the Hoved Line, the first railway line in Norway. He was also a director of traffic in the Norwegian State Railways from 1883 to 1989.
