= Kaare Støylen =

Norwegian theologian and priest

Right Reverend Doctor Kaare Støylen
- Bishop of Oslo; Primate of the Church of Norway
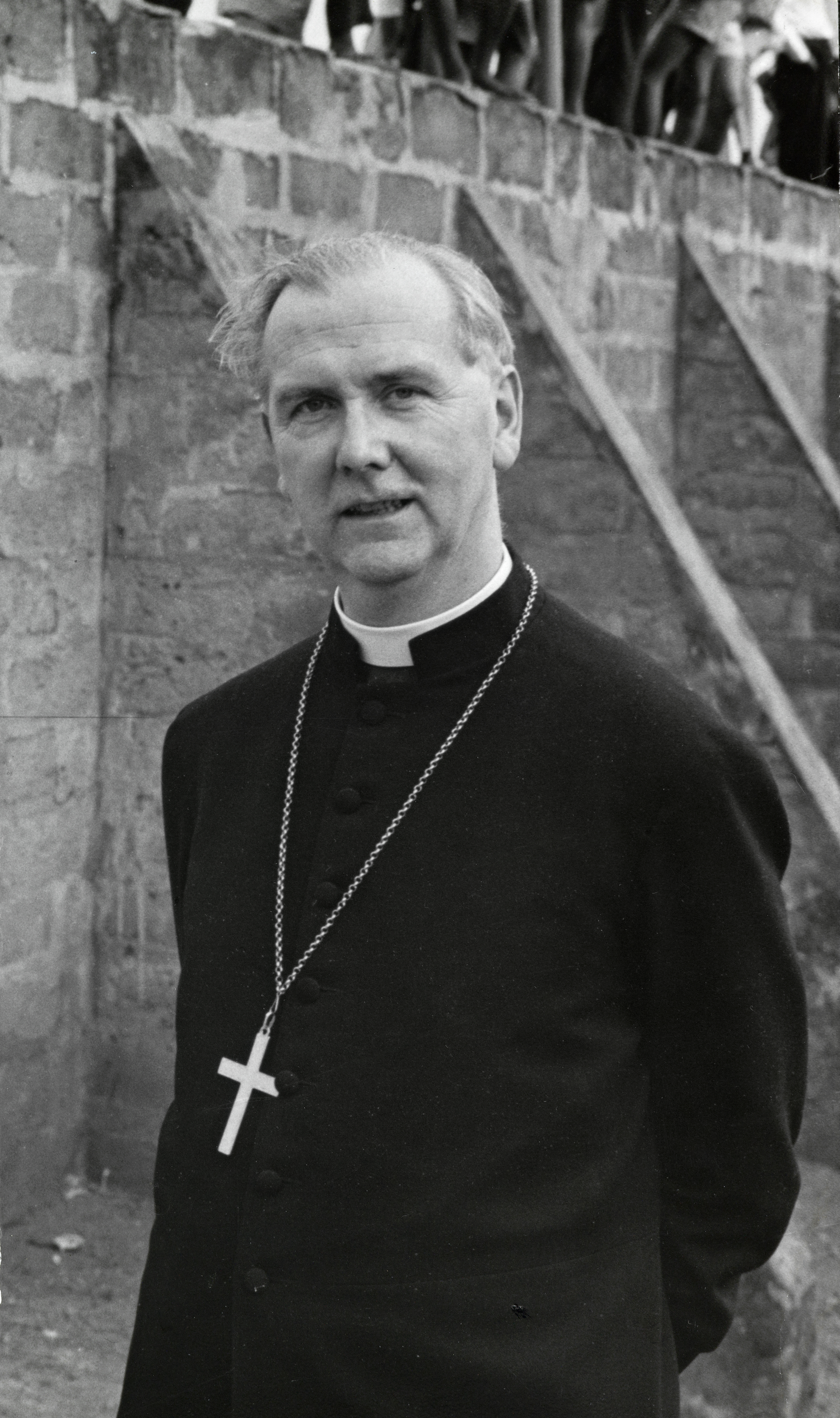
- Kaare Støylen in Nigeria in 1965 (Photo:John Taylor/National Library of Norway)
- Church: Church of Norway
- Diocese: Diocese of Agder; Diocese of Oslo
- Appointed: 1957
- In office: 1957–1973 (Agder); 1973-1977 (Oslo); 1973-1977 (Preses)

Personal details
- Born: 3 October 1909 Aker, Norway
- Died: 22 August 1989 (aged 79) Bergen, Norway
- Denomination: Christian
- Parents: Bernt Støylen and Kamilla Karoline Heiberg
- Occupation: Priest
- Education: University of Oslo, Dr. theol.

Kaare Støylen (3 October 1909 – 22 August 1989) was a Norwegian theologian and priest. He served as the Bishop of the Diocese of Agder from 1957 to 1973.

== Personal life ==
Kaare Støylen was born in Aker, Norway on 3 October 1909. He was the son of Bernt Støylen, the future Bishop of Kristiansand, and his wife Kamilla Karoline Heiberg. In 1932, he married Agnes Louise Rosario Stray, however she died in 1943. He then married Honoria Margrethe Faye in 1945. Kaare Støylen died on 22 August 1989 in Bergen, Norway.

== Education and career ==
Kaare Støylen went to the Kristiansand Cathedral School in 1927. He went on to the University of Oslo, graduating in 1932 with a Cand.theol. degree. Later in life, in 1957, he graduated from the same school with a doctor of theology degree.

Støylen spent many years serving the Norwegian Seamen's Church. He first served as an assistant priest at the Seamen's Church in London from 1932 until 1935. After that, he moved to Oslo to work in the administrative offices of the Seamen's Church from 1935 until 1940. In 1940, he became an assistant priest at the Bergen Cathedral. In 1946, he became a priest at the St. Jakob Church in Bergen. He also worked for the congregation of people who were deaf that met Bergen. In 1955, he was appointed as the General Secretary of the Seamen's Church. He held this post until 1958 when he was appointed to serve as Bishop of the Diocese of Agder, based at the Kristiansand Cathedral. In 1973, after 15 years as bishop, he was appointed to be the new Bishop of the Diocese of Oslo. As bishop, he was given the honor of baptizing the future King of Norway, Crown Prince Haakon Magnus, in the Palace Chapel in Oslo in 1973. He was decorated as Commander with Star of the Royal Norwegian Order of St. Olav in 1975. He served as Bishop of Oslo until his retirement in 1977.

Religious titles
Preceded by Johannes Smidt	Bishop of Agder; 1957–1973	Succeeded by Erling Utnem
Preceded by Fridtjov Søiland Birkeli	Bishop of Oslo; 1973–1977	Succeeded by Andreas Aarflot
Preceded by Fridtjov Søiland Birkeli	Preses of the Church of Norway; 1973–1977	Succeeded by Andreas Aarflot
