= Norwegian Sociological Association =

The Norwegian Sociological Association (Norwegian: Norsk sosiologforening) is a scholarly and professional society for sociologists in Norway. It was established in 1949. It is a member association of the Nordic Sociological Association, the European Sociological Association and the International Sociological Association. Each year it hosts an annual conference, called the Winter Conference. Through the Nordic Sociological Association, it owns the English-language journal Acta Sociologica with the sociological associations in the other Nordic countries.
