= Helen Engelstad =

Norwegian author, art historian and educator

Helen Engelstad (27 May 1908 – 5 March 1989) was a Norwegian author, art historian and educator.

== Biography ==
Helen Wright was born in Elsinore, Helsingør Municipality, Denmark. Her childhood was characterized by prosperity and contact with the intellectual community. She continued her education at the University of Copenhagen. She later worked at the Danish Museum of Art & Design at the University for two years. She moved to Norway in 1930 when she married Norwegian art historian Eivind Stenersen Engelstad (1900-1969). Their marriage was dissolved in 1951.

Helen Engelstad first worked as an assistant at the Stavanger Museum. From 1946 to 1947 she was the manager of the museum at the Royal Manor of Ledaal. From 1947 to 1976 she was the rector of the National Arts and Crafts Teachers' College, which is now a part of the Oslo University College.

Helen Engelstad was appointed Knight of the 1st class Order of St. Olav in 1975 and also received King's Medal of Merit in gold.

== Selected works ==
- Strikkeboken: praktisk veiledning i moderne strikning, 1932
- Norske navneduker, 1938
- Messeklær og alterskrud. Middelalderske paramenter i Norge, 1941
- Porselen og paramenter. Brukskunstneren Nora Gulbrandsens arbeider, 1944
- Alle tiders drakt og mote, 1949
- Vevkunst, 1953
- Dobbeltvev i Norge, 1958
- Vævninger fra det gamle Peru, 1985

== Other sources ==
- Engelstad, Helen (1952) Norwegian Textiles (F Lewis, Publishers. Leigh-On-Sea, UK) ISBN 978-0853172703
