= Roxann Engelstad =

American mechanical engineer

Roxann (Roxy) L. Engelstad is a retired American mechanical engineer specializing in the vibrations and dynamics of structures on scales ranging from pipes and space tethers to X-ray lithography masks. She is Stephen P. Timoshenko Professor Emeritus and Bernard A. & Frances M. Weideman Professor Emeritus in the Department of Mechanical Engineering at the University of Wisconsin–Madison.

== Education and career ==
Engelstad is a 1972 graduate of Deerfield High School (Wisconsin). She spent the rest of her academic career at the University of Wisconsin–Madison; she earned bachelor's, master's, and PhD degrees in engineering mechanics there in 1977, 1979, and 1988, respectively, and joined the faculty as an assistant professor in 1988. She chaired the mechanical engineering department from 2007 to 2013, was given an endowed chair in 2008, and retired in 2017.

== Recognition ==
Engelstad was named an ASME Fellow in 2013. She is also a Fellow of SPIE.

Engelstad's mentorship of students at Wisconsin was recognized in 1999 by the Aristotle Award of the Semiconductor Research Corporation. In 2015, the University of Wisconsin gave Engelstad their Benjamin Smith Reynolds Award for Excellence in Teaching.
