= Norsk Slektshistorisk Tidsskrift =

- Categories: Genealogy and History
- Frequency: 2 issues per year
- Publisher: Norwegian Genealogical Society (Norsk Slektshistorisk Forening)
- Founded: 1927
- Country: Norway
- Based in: Oslo
- Language: Norwegian
- Website: http://www.genealogi.no/node/7
- ISSN: 0029-2141

Norsk Slektshistorisk Tidsskrift (NST) (Norwegian: "Journal of Norwegian Genealogy") is the academic journal for genealogy published in the Norwegian language by the Norwegian Genealogical Society. First published in 1927, it is the successor of two previous genealogical and historical magazines of Norway, Norsk Personalhistorisk Tidsskrift [Journal of Norwegian Personal History] (published in three volumes in 1910, 1920, 1926) and Personalhistorisk Tidsskrift [Journal of Personal History] (published in 1880).

Behind its trademark vermilion cover, NST’s design and contents are similar to that of the National Genealogical Society Quarterly from the National Genealogical Society of the United States and the Genealogists’ Magazine from the Society of Genealogists of the United Kingdom. In other words, the NST specializes in the Middle Ages, the Renaissance and the 18th Century, the three great brickwalls of modern genealogical research. Its articles cover virtually every parish, region and city in Norway but its readers and subscribers are not limited to Norway. It is being read wherever there are descendants of Norwegian emigrants – Sweden, Denmark, Germany, Canada and the United States, to name a few.

Since 1927, NST has been publishing two issues for each year. Each volume has four issues, covering two years at a time. with two issues for each year. So far, 43 volumes are available but only the first 39 volumes are bound.
