= Bernt Støylen =

Norwegian theologian, psalmist and Bishop

Right Reverend Bernt Støylen
- Bishop
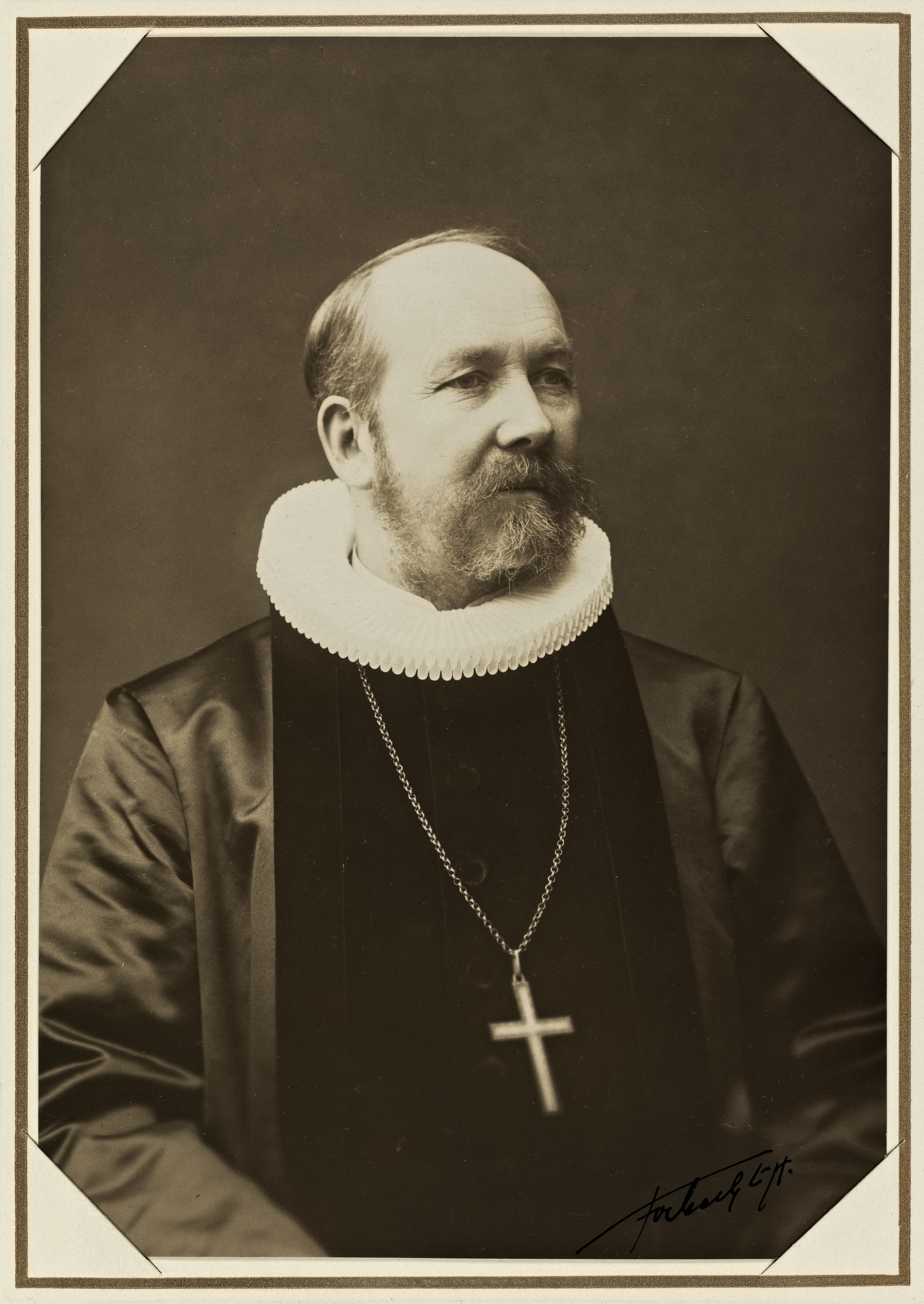
- Church: Church of Norway
- Diocese: Diocese of Kristiansand and Diocese of Agder
- Appointed: 1914
- In office: 1930

Personal details
- Born: 17 February 1858 Sande Municipality, Norway
- Died: 18 November 1937 (aged 79) Bærum Municipality, Norway
- Denomination: Christian
- Occupation: Priest
- Education: Cand.theol.
- Alma mater: University of Oslo

Bernt Andreas Støylen (17 February 1858–18 November 1937) was a Norwegian theologian, psalmist, and Bishop in the Church of Norway.

== Personal life ==
Støylen was born in Sande Municipality in Romsdalen county, Norway on 17 February 1858. He was the son of farmer and fisherman Andreas Olsen Støylen and Margrete Helgesdatter Bringsvor. He was married in Bergen in 1890 to Kamilla Karoline Heiberg. His son was Kaare Støylen, a future bishop, and his brother-in-law was Georg Sverdrup, the Norwegian-American theologian. He died in Bærum Municipality, Norway in 1937.

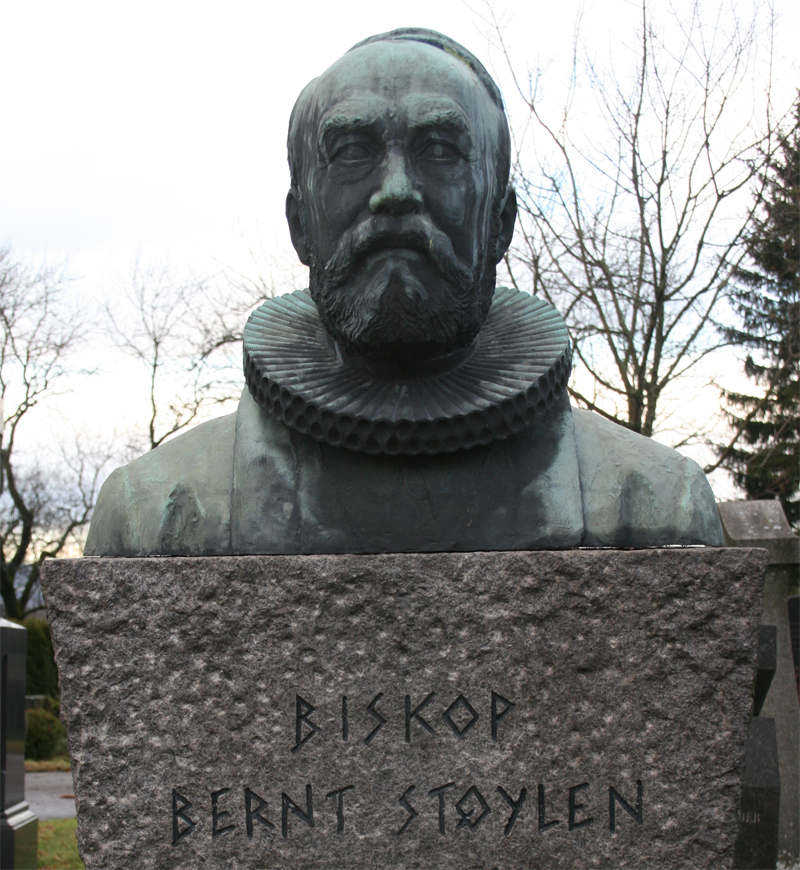
Sculpture of Bernt Støylen

== Career ==
Støylen graduated from a teaching school in Volda in 1875. After some time as a teacher, he took his examen artium in 1879. He then went on to study theology at the University of Oslo, receiving his Cand.theol. degree in 1885.

He began his career as a curate in the Johannes Church parish in Bergen from 1887-1890. After that, he served as a priest of the Norwegian Church Abroad at Cardiff in Wales in the United Kingdom. He worked there from 1890 until 1895. After returning to Norway, he was hired to teach at a new seminary in Notodden from 1895-1902. After that, starting in 1902, he taught at the Theological Seminary at the University of Oslo, first as a teacher, and in 1909 he was named a professor. In 1914, Støylen was appointed to be the bishop of the Diocese of Kristiansand. In 1925, when he was Bishop of Kristiansand, the government approved the division of the diocese with all of Rogaland county breaking off from the diocese to form the new Diocese of Stavanger. Støylen continued on as bishop of the newly-renamed Diocese of Agder until his retirement in 1930.

== Selected works ==
He published a series of readers for primary school, Lesebok for folkeskulen, from 1908 to 1911. In 1925, he was co-editor of the hymnal Nynorsk salmebok together with Peter Hognestad and Anders Hovden. This hymnal was written in the Nynorsk written language, one of the two main written forms of Norwegian.

Church of Norway titles
Preceded by Kristian Vilhelm Koren Schjelderup, Sr.	Bishop of Kristiansand; 1914–1925	Diocese divided into: Diocese of Stavanger and Diocese of Agder
New diocese	Bishop of Agder; 1925–1930	Succeeded by James Maroni
