= Kristian Smidt =

Norwegian literary historian

- Born: 20 November 1916; Sandefjord, Norway
- Died: 9 August 2013 (aged 96)
- Occupation: Literary historian
- Parent: Johannes Smidt

Kristian Smidt, OBE (20 November 1916 – 9 August 2013) was a Norwegian literary historian.

== Biography ==
Smidt was born in Sandefjord as a son of bishop Johannes Smidt. His doctor thesis from 1949 was a treatment of the work of T. S. Eliot. He was appointed professor of English literature at the University of Oslo from 1955 to 1985. Among his publications are works on James Joyce and on the composition of Shakespeare's plays.

Smidt also researched on text problems in Shakespeare, with special focus on Richard III. He has authored several books analyzing the works of several famous writers. His works included The Diverse Shakespeare (2000), Ibsen Translated (2000, which examines the English translation of A Doll's House) and Silent Creditors (2004). Smidt published a collection of essays on poetry and criticism in 1972.

In 1957 he became a fellow of the Norwegian Academy of Science and Letters. He was decorated with the Order of the British Empire in 1985. He died in August 2013.
