= Queen Sonja of Norway =

Queen of Norway from 1991 to 2026

Sonja
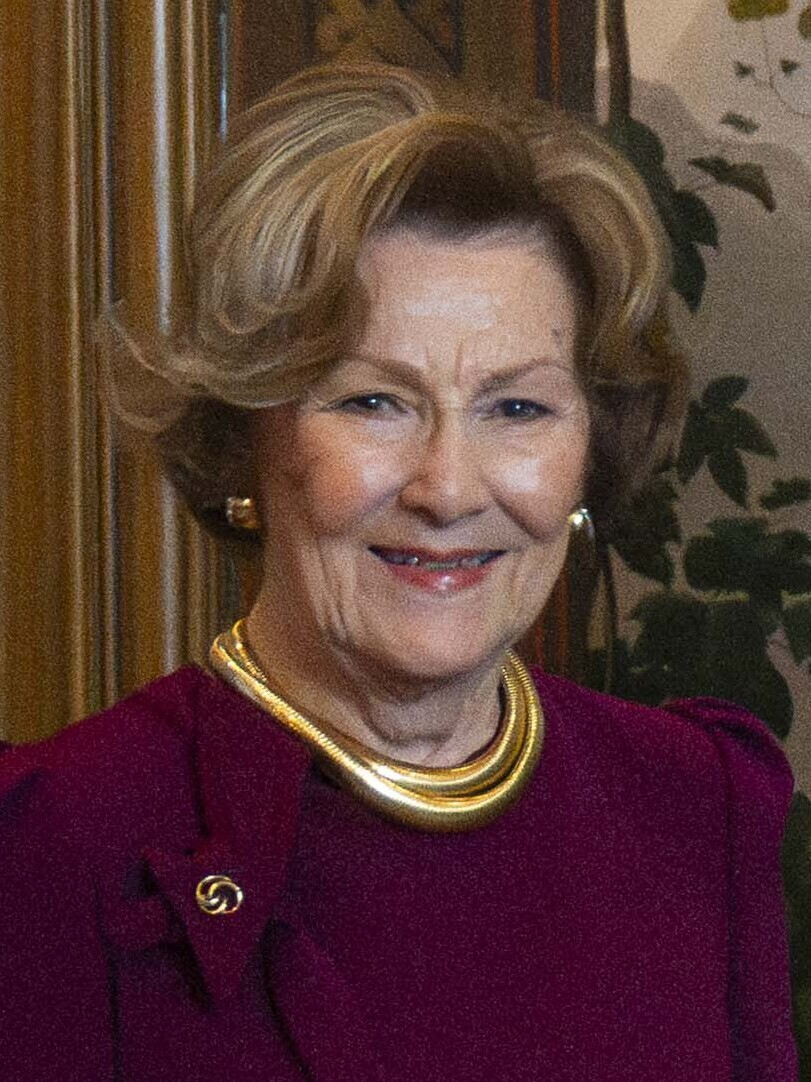
- Sonja in 2025

Queen consort of Norway
- Tenure: 17 January 1991 – 28 August 2026
- Benediction: 23 June 1991 (Note: Coronation discarded by constitutional amendment in 1908. Harald V swore the Royal Oath in the Storting on 21 January 1991 and received the benediction in the Nidaros Cathedral on 23 June 1991.); Nidaros Cathedral
- Born: Sonja Haraldsen; 4 July 1937 (age 89); Oslo, Norway
- Spouse: Harald V (m. 1968; died 2026)
- Issue: Princess Märtha Louise; Haakon VIII
- House: Glücksburg (by marriage)
- Father: Karl August Haraldsen
- Mother: Dagny Ulrichsen
- Religion: Church of Norway
- Education: University of Oslo (cand. mag.)

Queen Sonja of Norway (born Sonja Haraldsen; 4 July 1937) is a member of the Norwegian royal family who was Queen of Norway from 1991 to 2026 as the wife of King Harald V. She is the mother of Haakon VIII, the current king of Norway.

Sonja and the then Crown Prince Harald had dated for nine years before their marriage in 1968. They kept their relationship secret because of the controversy surrounding Sonja's status as a commoner. Harald told his father, King Olav V, that he would remain unmarried if he did not receive consent to marry her. Upon their marriage, Sonja became crown princess and later Queen of Norway upon her husband's accession to the throne in 1991, becoming Norway's first queen consort since Maud of Wales, who died in 1938. The couple have two children together: Princess Märtha Louise and King Haakon VIII. They were married for almost 58 years, until Harald's death in August 2026. Following her husband's death, her official title became "Her Majesty Queen Sonja". (Note: Her former title, "Her Majesty The Queen of Norway", is reserved exclusively for the wife of the reigning king.)

As queen consort, Sonja held patronage of up to 15 organisations. She served as Vice President of the Norwegian Red Cross from 1987 to 1990. In 2005, she became the first queen to visit Antarctica. In 2017, she received the Trysil-Knut Prize, becoming the first woman to receive the award. She is known for her interest in music, art, and culture, having founded the Queen Sonja International Music Competition and the Queen Sonja Print Award. She is also a graphic artist and ceramicist, with many of her works being featured in exhibitions across Norway and other countries.

== Early life ==
Sonja Haraldsen was born on 4 July 1937 in Oslo, Norway, the youngest child of clothing merchant Karl August Haraldsen (1889–1959) and Dagny Ulrichsen (1898–1994). She had three siblings: Haakon Haraldsen (1921–2016), Gry Henriksen (1924–1970), and Karl Herman Haraldsen (1929–1936), who died in a boating accident before she was born. Haraldsen grew up in the district of Vinderen in Oslo and completed her lower secondary schooling in 1954. She received a diploma in dressmaking and tailoring at the Oslo Vocational School, and a diploma from École Professionnelle des Jeunes Filles, a finishing school in Lausanne, Switzerland, where she studied accounting, fashion design, and social science. She returned to Norway for further studies and received an undergraduate degree in French, English and Art History from the University of Oslo.

== Personal life ==
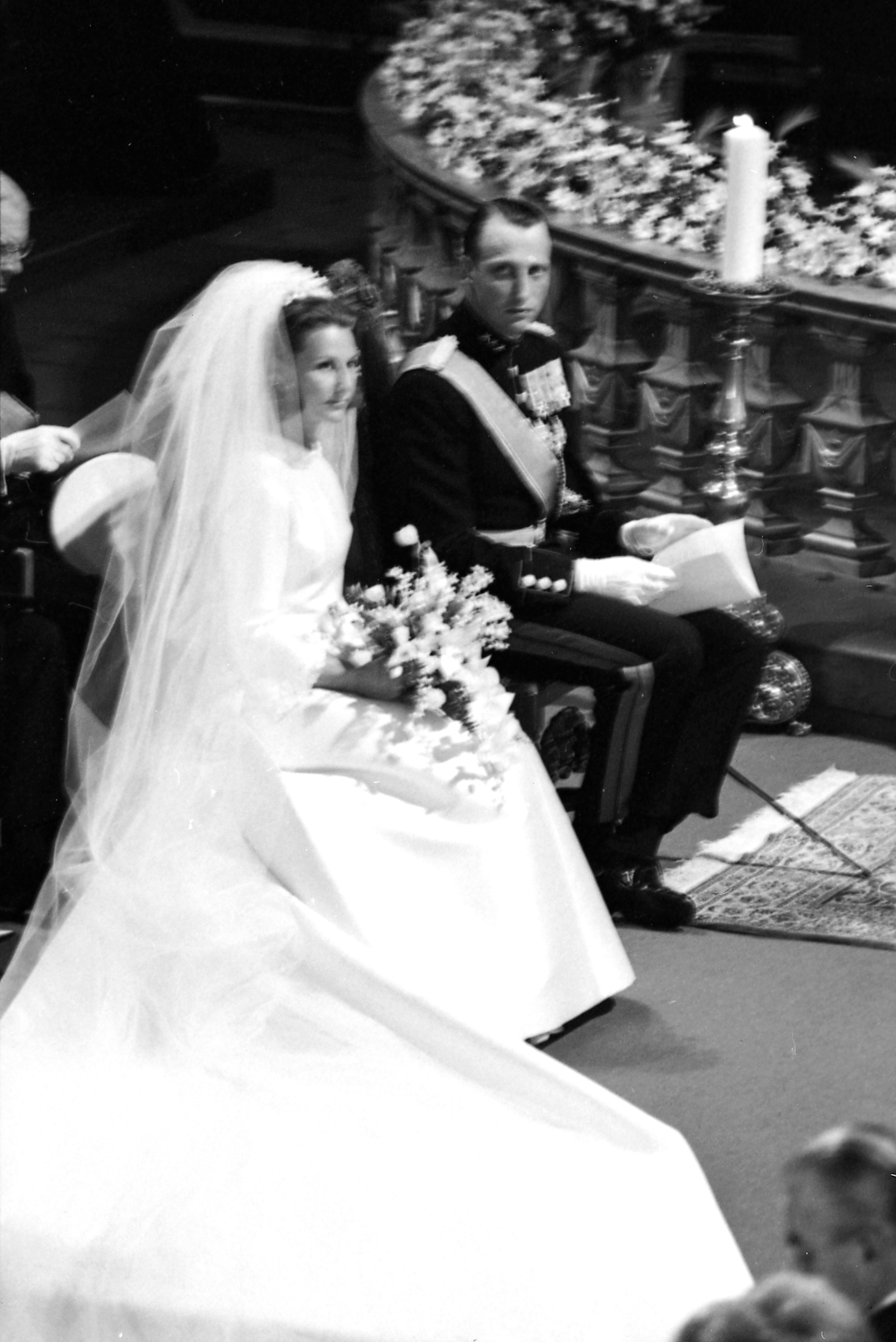
Sonja and Harald during their wedding ceremony

In June 1959, Haraldsen first met Crown Prince Harald (the future King Harald V) at a party hosted by Johan H. Stenersen. Later that August, Harald invited her to his graduation ball, where they were photographed together for the first time. They dated for nine years, although their relationship was kept secret because she was a commoner. Harald made it clear to his father, King Olav V, that he would remain unmarried for life unless he could marry her. This would in effect have put an end to the rule of his family, and likely to the monarchy in Norway, as Harald was the sole heir to the throne. Faced with having to choose one of his relatives from the Danish royal family, the Dukes of Schleswig-Holstein, or even the Grand Dukes of Oldenburg as his new heir in place of his son, Olav consulted the government for advice; as a result, Haraldsen became engaged to Harald on 19 March 1968. The couple married later that year, on 29 August at Oslo Cathedral. She thus acquired the style of Royal Highness and the title of Crown Princess of Norway. They have two children, Märtha Louise (born 1971) and Haakon VIII (born 1973). Harald died on 28 August 2026, aged 89.

=== Health ===
In January 2025, Sonja was admitted to Lillehammer Hospital for observation following atrial fibrillation while on a skiing trip. She underwent surgery at the Oslo University Hospital on 16 January to receive a pacemaker implant. In April 2025, she was hospitalised at the National Hospital due to shortness of breath. On 27 May 2026, she was hospitalised due to atrial fibrillation and heart failure. The following day, her husband said in an interview that she was in better form and leaving the hospital.

== Public life ==
Following the death of King Olav V on 17 January 1991, Sonja became Norway's first queen consort in 52 years. Queen Sonja accompanied King Harald V when he swore his oath to uphold the Constitution in the Storting on 21 January 1991. During Haakon VII's reign, his wife Queen Maud died in 1938, and his son Olav was then crown prince when his wife Princess Märtha of Sweden died in 1954, three years before he became king. It was also the first time in 69 years that a Norwegian queen had been present in the Storting. Since his accession, Sonja has accompanied the King to the formal opening of the autumn session of the Storting and the reading of the Speech from the Throne.

In accordance with their own wishes, Sonja and Harald were consecrated in Nidaros Cathedral in Trondheim on 23 June 1991. Following the consecration, they conducted a 10-day tour of Southern Norway. In 1992, the entire royal family conducted a 22-day tour of Norway's four northernmost counties.

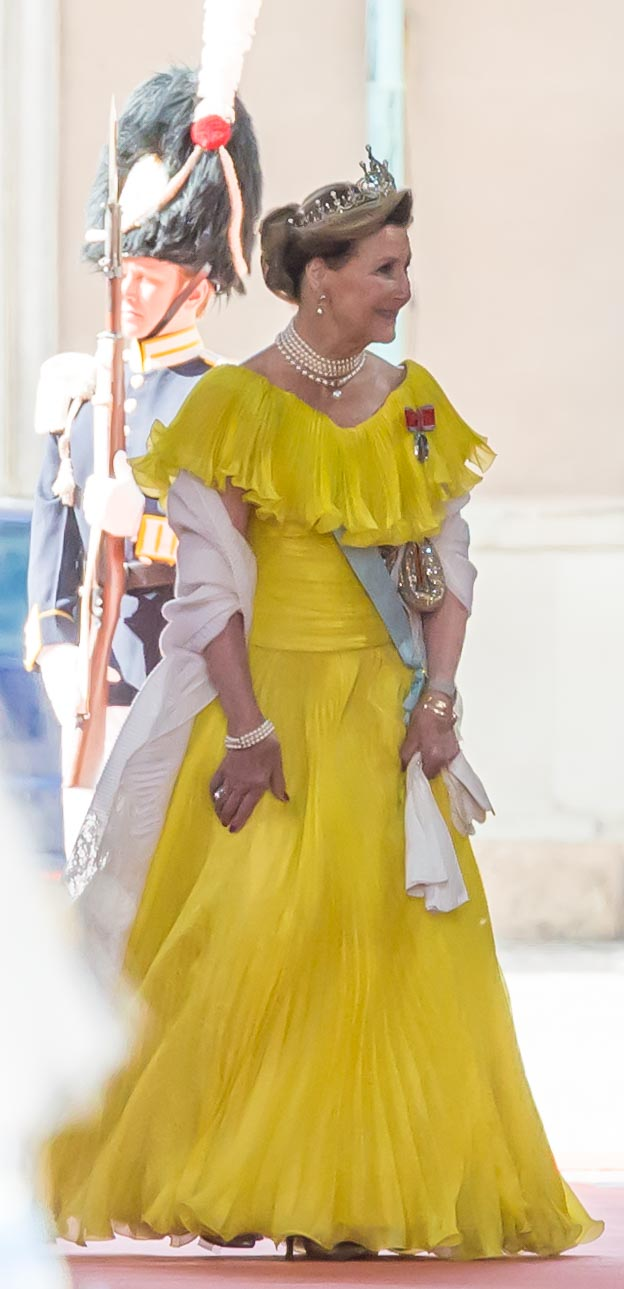
Sonja in Stockholm for Prince Carl Philip's wedding, 2015

Sonja accompanied Harald on official state visits abroad. She acted as the hostess when foreign heads of state officially visit Norway.

In 2005, Sonja became the first queen to visit Antarctica. She was there to open the Norwegian Troll research station in the country's Antarctic dependency, Queen Maud Land. Sonja flew in on one of the Royal Norwegian Air Force's C-130H Hercules transport aircraft, landing at Troll Airfield.

In 2017, Sonja was awarded the Trysil-Knut Prize. She is the first woman to receive the award.

The Queen was appointed a Rear Admiral in the Royal Norwegian Navy and a Brigadier in the Norwegian Army. She has undergone a basic officer training course and has participated in exercises.

On 17 January 2021, Sonja marked 30 years as Norway's queen consort, in tandem with the anniversary of her husband's accession to the throne.

After the death of Harald V, Sonja ceased to be queen consort, being titled simply as "Queen Sonja". It was initially reported in the media that she would not bear the style of Her Majesty, but her official biography on the Norwegian royal family's website continues to refer to her as "Her Majesty Queen Sonja". The Royal Court officially adopted the title of kongemor to refer to Sonja, reflecting her new position as the mother of the reigning monarch. Translating literally to "king's mother", the term serves as the Norwegian equivalent to the English titles of queen mother or queen dowager. The title was first utilized in an official capacity by the court during the funeral of Princess Astrid in September 2026. The adoption of kongemor sparked public discussion in Norway, as the term represents a departure from recent modern royal custom and is rooted in Viking Age and saga history. Queen Sonja also ceased to be a member of the Royal House (Kongehuset), which consists only of the reigning monarch, his spouse and their heirs for each succeeding generation.

=== Activities ===
In 1972, Sonja was involved in establishing Princess Märtha Louise's Fund, which provides assistance to disabled children in Norway. She has taken active part in large-scale initiatives to raise funds for international refugees and spent time in the 1970s visiting Vietnamese boat refugees in Malaysia.

From 1987 to 1990, Sonja served as Vice President of the Norwegian Red Cross. She was responsible for the organisation's international activities and took part in a Red Cross delegation to Botswana and Zimbabwe in 1989.

Queen Sonja's School Award was established in 2006 and is awarded to schools who have "demonstrated excellence in its efforts to promote inclusion and equality".

=== Personal interests ===
Sonja established the Queen Sonja International Music Competition in 1988. It was originally for pianists, but in 1995 the competition became only for singers. The jury consists of diverse authoritative figures in opera, and the winners receive a cash award and engagements at Norwegian music institutions.

Sonja is a longtime photographer and has a keen interest in art. She is a printmaker and held exhibitions with artists Kjell Nupen and Ørnulf Opdahl in 2011 and 2013. The Queen Sonja Nordic Art Award was established in 2011, with Tiina Kivinen from Finland as the first recipient in 2012.

In 2017, The Queen Sonja Art Stable was opened as a venue for arts and culture. Together with Harald, Sonja has for decades attempted to establish a palace museum in Oslo.

Sonja is a keen hiker, and this was marked by a sculpture unveiled for her 80th birthday as a gift from the Norwegian Trekking Association.

=== In popular culture ===
In 2025, Amazon Prime Video released the period drama The Commoner, which tells the story of the fight of then Crown Prince Harald and Sonja Haraldsen for their right to marry. Sonja is portrayed by Gina Bernhoft Gørvell.

== Arms ==
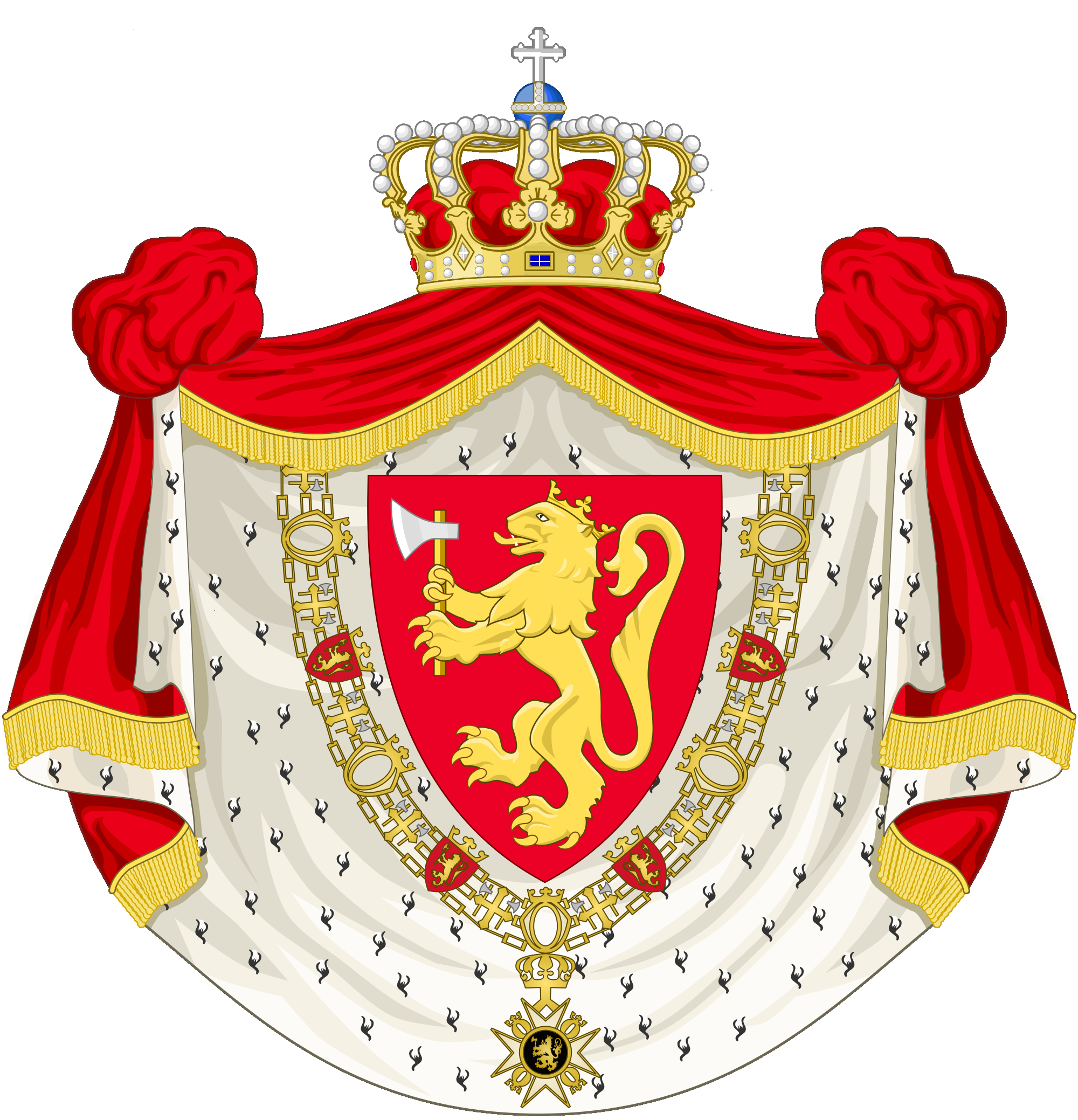
Coat of arms

Monogram

== Honours ==
In 1982, she was awarded the Nansen Refugee Award. In 2007, Sonja received the Holmenkollen medal with Simon Ammann, Frode Estil, Odd-Bjørn Hjelmeset, and her husband, Harald.

Sonja received an Honorary Doctorate from Heriot-Watt University in 1994.

=== National orders ===
- Norway: Grand Cross with Collar of the Royal Norwegian Order of Saint Olav °
- Norway: Grand Cross of the Royal Norwegian Order of Merit °
- (Norway) The Royal House Centenary Medal °
- (Norway) Haakon VIIs Centenary Medal °
- (Norway) Olav Vs Commemorative Medal of 30. January 1991 °
- (Norway) Olav Vs Jubilee Medal 1957-1982 °
- (Norway) Olav Vs Centenary Medal°
- (Norway) Harald Vs Jubilee Medal 1991-2016 °
- Royal Family Order of King Olav V of Norway °
- Royal Family Order of King Harald V of Norway °
- (Norway) Norwegian Red Cross Badge of Honour °
- (Norway) The Nansen Medal °
- (Norway) Oslo Military Society Badge of Honour in Gold °
- (Norway) Recipient of the Holmenkollen Medal

=== Foreign orders ===
- Argentina: Grand Cross of the Order of May °
- Austria: Grand Star of the Decoration of Honour for Services to the Republic of Austria (1978) °
- Belgium: Grand Cordon of the Order of Leopold °
- Brazil: Grand Cross of the Order of the Southern Cross °
- Bulgaria: Sash of the Order of the Balkan Mountains °
- Chile: Grand Cross of the Order of Merit °
- Croatia: Grand Cross of the Grand Order of Queen Jelena (12 May 2011)
- Denmark: Knight of the Order of the Elephant (12 February 1973) °
- Estonia: Member 1st Class of the Order of the Cross of Terra Mariana (24 August 1998) °
- Estonia: Member 1st Class of the Order of the White Star (2 September 2014)
- Finland: Commander Grand Cross of the Order of the White Rose of Finland °
- France:
  - Grand Cross of the National Order of Merit °
  - Grand Cross of the Legion of Honour °
- Germany: Grand Cross Special Class of the Order of Merit of the Federal Republic of Germany °
- Greece: Grand Cross of the Order of the Redeemer °
- Hungary: Grand Cross of the Order of Merit of the Republic of Hungary °
- IOC: Recipient of the Gold Olympic Order °
- Iceland: Grand Cross of the Order of the Falcon (21 October 1981) °
- Italy: Knight Grand Cross of the Order of Merit of the Italian Republic (19 October 2001) °
- Japan: Grand Cordon (Paulownia) of the Order of the Precious Crown °
- Jordan: Grand Cordon of the Supreme Order of the Renaissance ° (Order of Al-Nahda)
- Latvia: Commander Grand Cross of the Order of the Three Stars (2 September 1998) °
- Latvia: Recipient of the 1st Class of Cross of Recognition (12 March 2015) °
- Lithuania: Grand Cross of the Order of Vytautas the Great (3 September 1998) °
- Luxembourg: Grand Cross of the Order of Adolph of Nassau °
- Luxembourg: Knight of the Order of the Gold Lion of the House of Nassau °
- Netherlands: Knight Grand Cross of the Order of the Netherlands Lion °
- Netherlands: Grand Cross of the Order of the Crown °
- Netherlands: Recipient of Queen Beatrix's Inauguration Medal °
- Poland: Knight of the Order of the White Eagle °
- Portugal: Grand Cross of the Order of Merit of Portugal (2 January 1981) °
- Portugal: Grand Cross of the Order of Infante Dom Henrique (13 February 2004) °
- Portugal: Grand Cross of the Order of Christ (26 May 2008) °
- Slovakia: Member 2nd Class of the Order of the White Double Cross (2010)
- Slovenia: Member of the Order for Exceptional Merits (2011) °
- South Korea: Member 1st Class (Grand Gwanghwa Medal) of the Order of Diplomatic Service Merit °
- Spain: Dame Grand Cross of the Order of Charles III (21 April 1995) °
- Spain: Dame Grand Cross of the Order of Isabella the Catholic (12 April 1982) °
- Sweden: Knight of the Royal Order of the Seraphim °
- Sweden: Recipient of the 50th Birthday Badge Medal of King Carl XVI Gustaf (30 April 1996)
- Sweden: Recipient of the Ruby Jubilee Badge Medal of King Carl XVI Gustaf (15 September 2013)
- Sweden: Recipient of the Golden Jubilee Badge Medal of King Carl XVI Gustaf (15 September 2023)

Rem : The mark ° shows the honours mentioned on Queen Sonja's official website page

== Notes ==
Norwegian royalty
Vacant Title last held by Maud of Wales	Queen consort of Norway; 1991–2026	Succeeded by Mette-Marit Tjessem Høiby
