= Lindhardt =

Lindhardt is Danish a surname. Notable people with the surname include:

- Albert Rudbeck Lindhardt (born 2001), Danish actor
- Jan Lindhardt (1938–2014), Danish theologian, Lutheran bishop
- Jens Lindhardt (born 1946), Danish rower
- Thure Lindhardt (born 1974), Danish actor
- Tine Lindhardt (born 1957), Danish theologian, Lutheran bishop
