= Søren Tybring =

Norwegian politician (1773–1822)

Søren Tybring (6 November 1773 – 19 November 1822) was a Norwegian priest and politician.

Tybring was from Høland in Akershus, Norway. He was the son of Johan Broderus Edinger Tybring (1735-1782) and Ellen Geelmuyeden (1747-1824). His father was a parish priest who died when Søren Tybring was 9. He grew up with his uncle, Hans Heinrich Tübring, Bishop of Diocese of Agder og Telemark. Tybring took his cand.theol. degree in 1796. He served as curate in Kristiansand Cathedral for two years before being hired as a school principal in the Bragernes neighborhood of Drammen. After serving as vicar at Karleby on the Danish island of Falster in 1802, he then returned to serve as vicar of Bragernes Church from 1802 until his death in 1822.

Tybring was elected to the Parliament of Norway in 1814 as a representative of the city of Drammen. He served through the first Extraordinary Parliament which on 4 November 1814 enacted the revised Norwegian Constitution (Grunnloven).
