= Kristiansand Museum =

These museums can be relevant:

- Agder Natural History Museum and Botanical Garden - formerly named Kristiansand Museum (until 1990).
- Kristiansand Cannon Museum, Batteri Vara, a museum in a German fortress from the World War II.
- Sørlandets Art Museum, in the town centre of Kristiansand.
- Vest-Agder Museum Gimle, a former manor house, next door to the natural history museum & botanical garden above.
- Vest-Agder Museum Kristiansand, an open-air museum, often for simplicity called Kristiansand Museum.
