= Peter Fischer-Møller =

The Right Reverend Peter Fischer-Møller
- Bishop of Roskilde
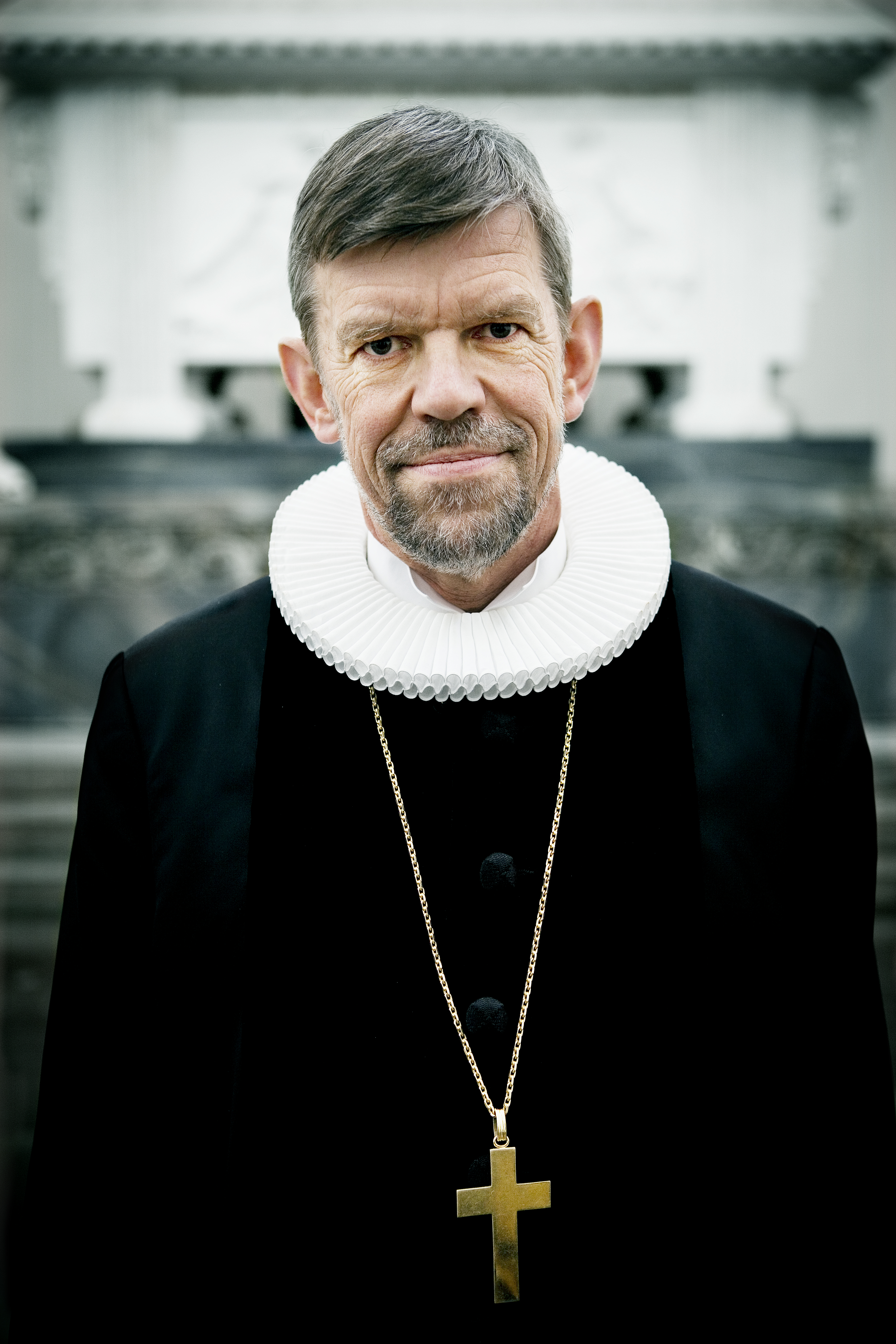
- Church: Church of Denmark
- Diocese: Roskilde
- Elected: 2008
- In office: 2008-2022
- Predecessor: Jan Lindhardt
- Successor: Ulla Thorbjørn Hansen

Orders
- Consecration: 27 April 2008

Personal details
- Born: 29 June 1955 (age 70) Charlottenlund, Denmark
- Denomination: Lutheran
- Spouse: Bente Munk
- Children: 1

Peter Fischer-Møller (born 29 June 1955 in Charlottenlund) is a Danish prelate who served as the Bishop of Roskilde from 2008 until 2022.

== Education ==
Fischer-Møller became a high school student in 1973 at Øregaard Gymnasium and specialised in mathematics and physics. He went to Oxford to study English literature. Although Fischer-Møller's father wanted him to become a lawyer, he chose to study theology at the University of Copenhagen. In the summer of 1983, he completed his studies. Peter Fischer-Møller gained a cand.theol. specializing in N. F. S. Grundtvig.

== Priesthood ==
In 1984 Peter Fischer-Møller was ordained as priest and became the parish priest of Terslev and Ørslev Sogne north of Haslev. In 1999 he also became the parish priest of Ringsted-Sorø. At the same time, Fischer-Møller worked as a lecturer at Haslev Seminary and Preschool.

== Bishop ==
Jan Lindhardt retired as Bishop of Roskilde in 2008 and choose Peter Fischer-Møller as one of five candidates to succeed him. At the first election, Fischer-Møller and Henrik Wigh-Poulsen, editor and head of the Grundtvig Academy, received the majority of votes with 562 each. Poul Joachim Stender received twelve votes less and protested over the election results, as there were more voters than ballot papers. Church Minister Birthe Rønn Hornbech joined the case, and the election board left the election. Peter Fischer-Møller received 693 votes and Poul Joachim Stender received 669 votes. Henrik Wigh-Poulsen received 625 votes, but only two candidates passed on to the decisive ballot. At the 2nd round, Fischer-Møller received 1174 votes while his opponent Poul Joachim Stenders 1055 votes. On 27 April 2008 Peter Fischer-Møller was consecrated bishop in Roskilde Cathedral and became the 7th bishop of Roskilde. On 1 May 2008 he was formally installed and took office as a bishop after Jan Lindhardt. On 1 January 2010 he became Knight of the Order of the Dannebrog.
