= Rasmus Paludan (bishop) =

Norwegian theologian and priest

Right Reverend Rasmus Paludan
- Bishop
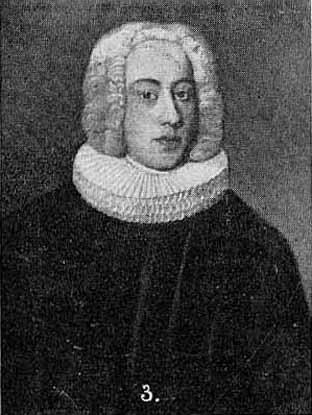
- Church: Church of Norway
- Diocese: Diocese of Christianssand

Personal details
- Born: 26 February 1702 Christiania, Norway
- Died: 8 January 1759 (aged 56) Christianssand, Norway
- Denomination: Christian
- Occupation: Priest

Rasmus Paludan (26 February 1702 – 8 January 1759) was a Norwegian theologian and priest. He served as a bishop of the Diocese of Christianssand from 1751 until 1759.

== Personal life ==
Rasmus Paludan was born on 26 February 1702 in Christiania, Norway. He was the son of Frederik Rasmussen and Anne Jacobsdatter. Paludan was married three times. He first married Margrethe Garmann in 1732, but she died in 1742. Then he married Johanne Fischer in 1743, and she died in 1754. He finally married Anna Margrethe Pohlmann in 1755 and they were married for about four years until his death on 8 January 1759. Over his lifetime, he fathered many children.

== Education and career ==
He attended Christiania Cathedral School until 1720. Then he completed his postgraduate studies at the University of Copenhagen from April 1720 until December 1721. After this, he was a teacher for several years until he was ordained by the Bishop Bartholomæus Deichman in 1730 and began working as a priest in Christiania. From 1740 to 1743 he worked as a priest in the town of Stege, Denmark, as well as the dean for the whole island of Møn. In 1743, he became the dean of Christiania.

In 1751, he was appointed to be the Bishop of the Diocese of Christianssand. When Paludan took over the bishop's seat in Christianssand, he was surprised at how many beggars and poor people there were in the diocese. The conditions were much worse than in Akershus, where he came from. Together with the county administrator Fredrik Georg Adeler, he began to work for a more effective poverty relief, but this was not easy. There was great poverty, both in rural areas and towns, both at the sea and up in the mountainous areas. On his first visit, Paludan spoke to the most powerful and richest men in every parish about helping the poor. He wanted to bring the poor people onto the farms so they could get work. Paludan's work, however, did not lead to any positive improvements during his time as bishop. He served in this position until his death in 1759.

Church of Norway titles
Preceded by Jacob Kærup	Bishop of Christianssand; 1751–1759	Succeeded by Jens Christian Spidberg
