= Tidemand =

Tidemand is a surname. Notable people with the surname include:

- Adolph Tidemand (1814–1876), Norwegian painter
- Ole Tidemand (1710–1778), Norwegian theologian and priest
- Otto Grieg Tidemand (1921–2006), Norwegian politician
- Pontus Tidemand (born 1990), Swedish rally and rallycross driver
