= Diocese of Roskilde =

Diocese of Roskilde Roskildes Stift
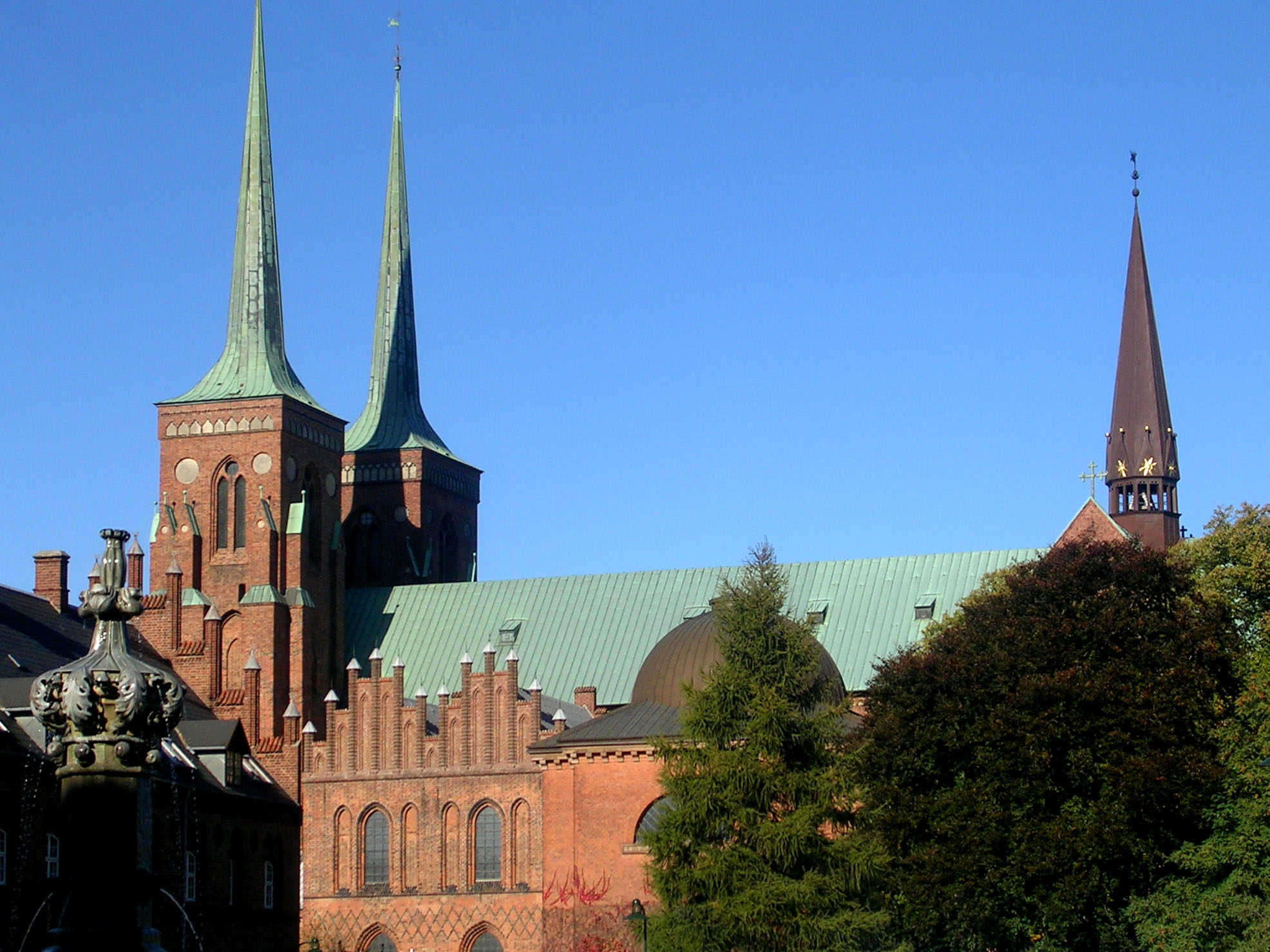
- Roskilde Cathedral, seat of the bishop.

Location
- Country: Denmark

Statistics
- Population: Total: (as of 2016); 729,011
- Members: 578,580 (79.4%)

Information
- Denomination: Church of Denmark
- Cathedral: Roskilde Cathedral

Current leadership
- Bishop: Ulla Thorbjørn Hansen

Website
- Website of the Diocese

The Diocese of Roskilde (Danish: Roskildes Stift) is a diocese within the Evangelical Lutheran Church of Denmark. The seat of the Bishop is Roskilde Cathedral in Roskilde.

== History ==
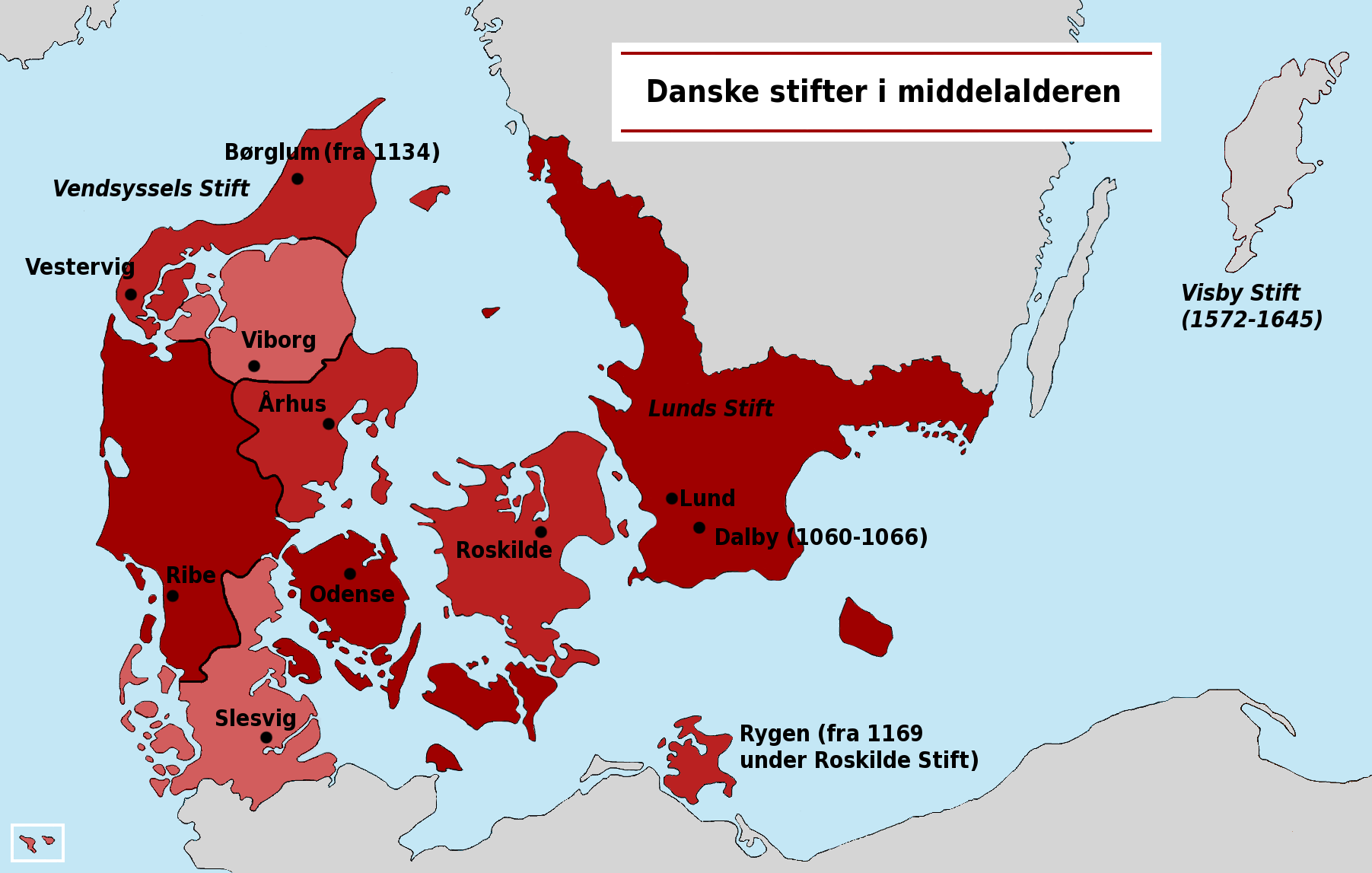
Danish dioceses in the middle ages

The Diocese of Roskilde was formed in 1922 when the Diocese of Zealand was divided into the Diocese of Copenhagen and the Diocese of Roskilde. The Diocese of Zealand was the ancient Diocese of Roskilde, founded in 1022 and renamed in 1537.

== Bishops of Roskilde ==
- 1923–1934 Henry Fonnesbech-Wulff
- 1935–1953 Axel Rosendal
- 1953–1969 Gudmund Schiøler
- 1969–1980 Hans Kvist
- 1980–1997 Bertil Wiberg
- 1997–2008 Jan Lindhardt
- 2008-2022 Peter Fischer-Møller
- 2022-present Ulla Thorbjørn Hansen

== See also ==
- Church of Denmark
- Ancient See of Roskilde
