= Tybring =

Tybring may refer to:

== People ==
- Christian Tybring-Gjedde (born 1963), Norwegian politician
- Ingvil Smines Tybring-Gjedde (born 1965), Norwegian politician
- Mathilde Tybring-Gjedde (born 1992), Norwegian politician
- Søren Tybring (1773–1822), Norwegian priest

== Other uses ==
- C. Tybring-Gjedde, Norwegian wholesaler
