= Peder Krog =

Norwegian Lutheran bishop

Right Reverend Peder Krog
- Bishop
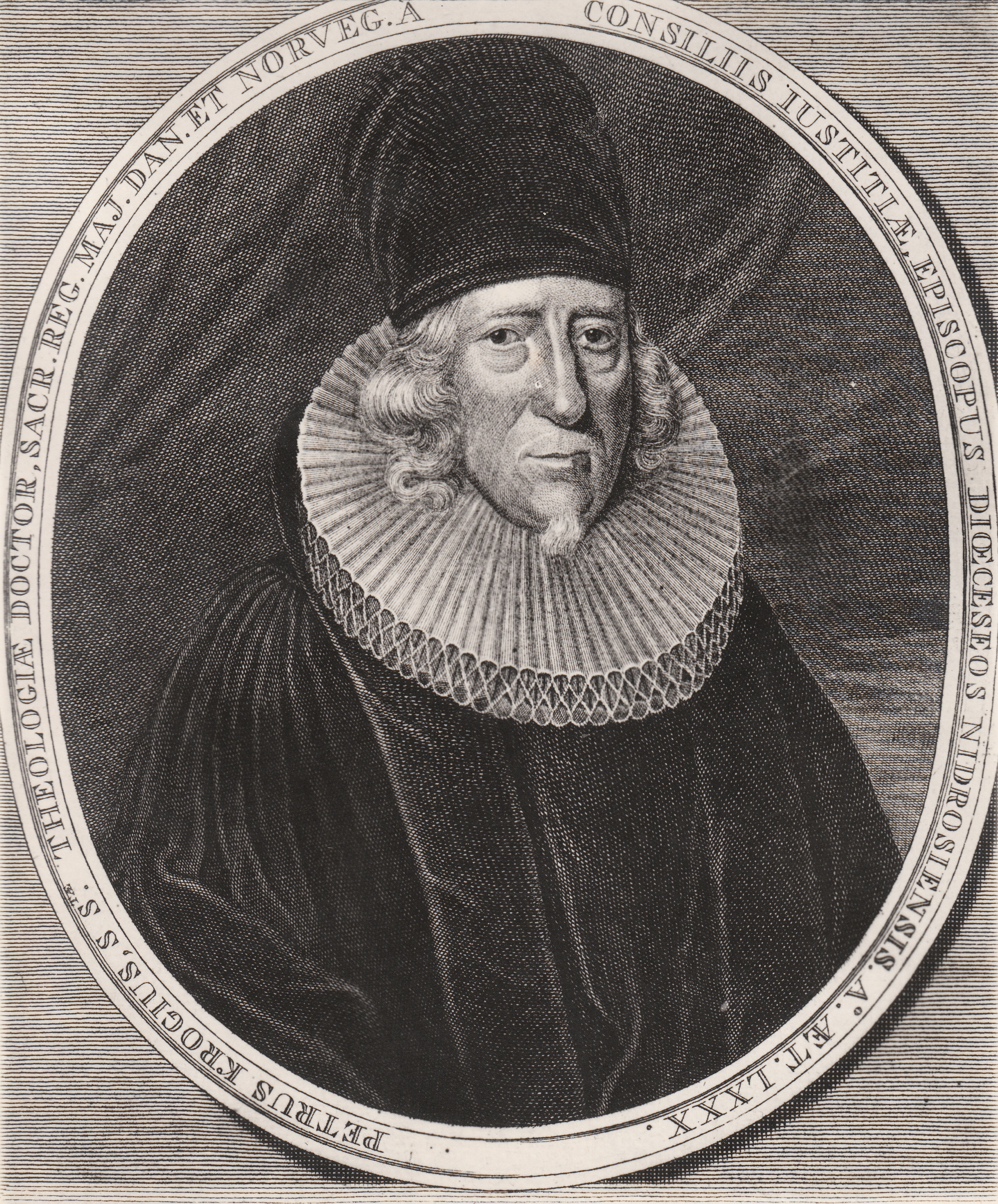
- Bishop Peder Krog (1654 - 1731)
- Church: Church of Norway
- Diocese: Trondhjem

Personal details
- Born: 8 April 1654 Aarhus, Denmark
- Died: 24 May 1731 (aged 77) Trondheim
- Denomination: Christian
- Occupation: Priest

Peder Krog (8 April 1654 – 24 May 1731) was a Danish-born Norwegian Lutheran bishop.

Peder Krog was born in Aarhus, Denmark. He studied in Rostock and Copenhagen, and then went to Germany to study for several years. In 1675, he was awarded his Magister Matriculation from Wittenberg. He was appointed rector of the Latin school in Kjøge in 1679. Two years later he became pastor of parishes in Holbæk and provost of Samsø. When the bishop of Trondheim died, Krog was ordained bishop in 1689.

Krog served as bishop in Trondhjem from 1689 until his death, longer than anybody else with a total of 42 years. He experienced several disasters during this period, such as the Trondhjem fire of 1708 and the siege of Trondhjem by Swedish troops in 1718 during the final days of the Great Northern War. He was involved in a number of conflict and lawsuits, of which at least six reached the Supreme Court.

He died in Trondheim on 24 May 1731.

Church of Norway titles
Preceded by Christopher Hanssen Schletter	Bishop of the Diocese of Trondhjem; 1689–1731	Succeeded by Eiler Hansen Hagerup
