= Hans Heinrich Tübring =

Norwegian theologian, priest

Right Reverend Hans Heinrich Tübring
- Bishop of Christianssand
- Church: Church of Norway
- Diocese: Diocese of Christianssand
- Appointed: 1789
- In office: 1789–1798

Personal details
- Born: 13 February 1732 Øiestad, Norway
- Died: 18 February 1798 (aged 66) Christianssand, Norway
- Denomination: Christian
- Occupation: Priest

Hans Heinrich Tübring (13 February 1732 – 18 February 1798) was a Norwegian theologian and priest. He served as a bishop in the Church of Norway from 1789 until 1798.

== Personal life ==
Hans Heinrich Tübring was born on 13 February 1732 in Øiestad, Norway to the parents Søren Madsen Tübring and Bolette Hansdatter Lemvig. His father was the parish priest in Øyestad. He was married in 1763 to Elisabeth Wilhelmine Lemvigh and together they had a son named Søren Lemvigh Tybring. Bishop Tübring died on 18 February 1798 in Christianssand, Norway. His nephew was Søren Tybring, a Norwegian priest and politician.

== Education and career ==
He was educated and he graduated in 1749, but he did not begin a career right away, but rather he returned home to teach his siblings. In 1759, he was hired as the ship's priest on the Danish warship Grønland and in 1760, he traveled on the ship Fyn that traveled to the Mediterranean Sea. After returning to Denmark, he worked aboard the Grønland for another year and a half. In 1763, he was called to be the parish priest in Aurdal, but he never started that job because he was hired as the assistant chaplain at the Church of Holmen in Copenhagen in Denmark. In 1766, he was promoted to a senior chaplain at the same church. In 1777, he was appointed to be the provost of the same church. On 6 May 1789, he was appointed to be the Bishop of the Diocese of Christianssand in Norway. He held that position until his death.

Church of Norway titles
Preceded by Eiler Hagerup	Bishop of Christianssand; 1789–1798	Succeeded by Peder Hansen
