= Diocese of Funen =

Diocese of Funen Fyens Stift
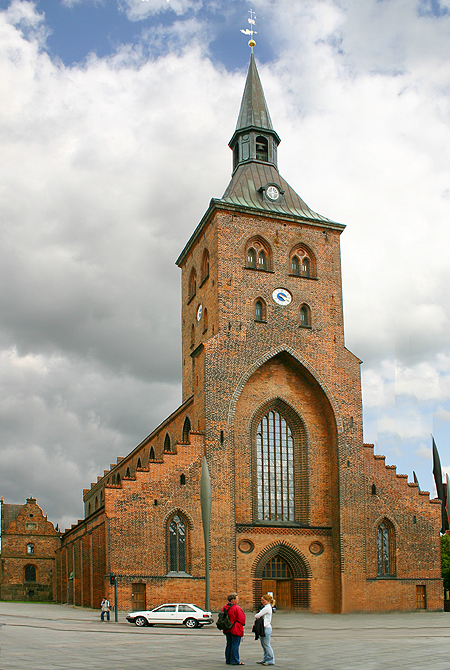
- The Cathedral of the diocese.

Location
- Country: Denmark

Statistics
- Population: Total: (as of 2016); 494,049
- Members: 396,637 (80.1%)

Information
- Denomination: Church of Denmark
- Cathedral: St. Canute's Cathedral

Current leadership
- Bishop: Mads Davidsens
- Bishops emeritus: Kresten Drejegaard Bishop Emeritus (1995-2012)

The Diocese of Funen (Danish: Fyens Stift) is a diocese within the Evangelical Lutheran Church of Denmark. St. Canute's Cathedral in Odense serves as the seat of its bishop. Tine Lindhardt has been the bishop of the diocese since 2012.

== History ==
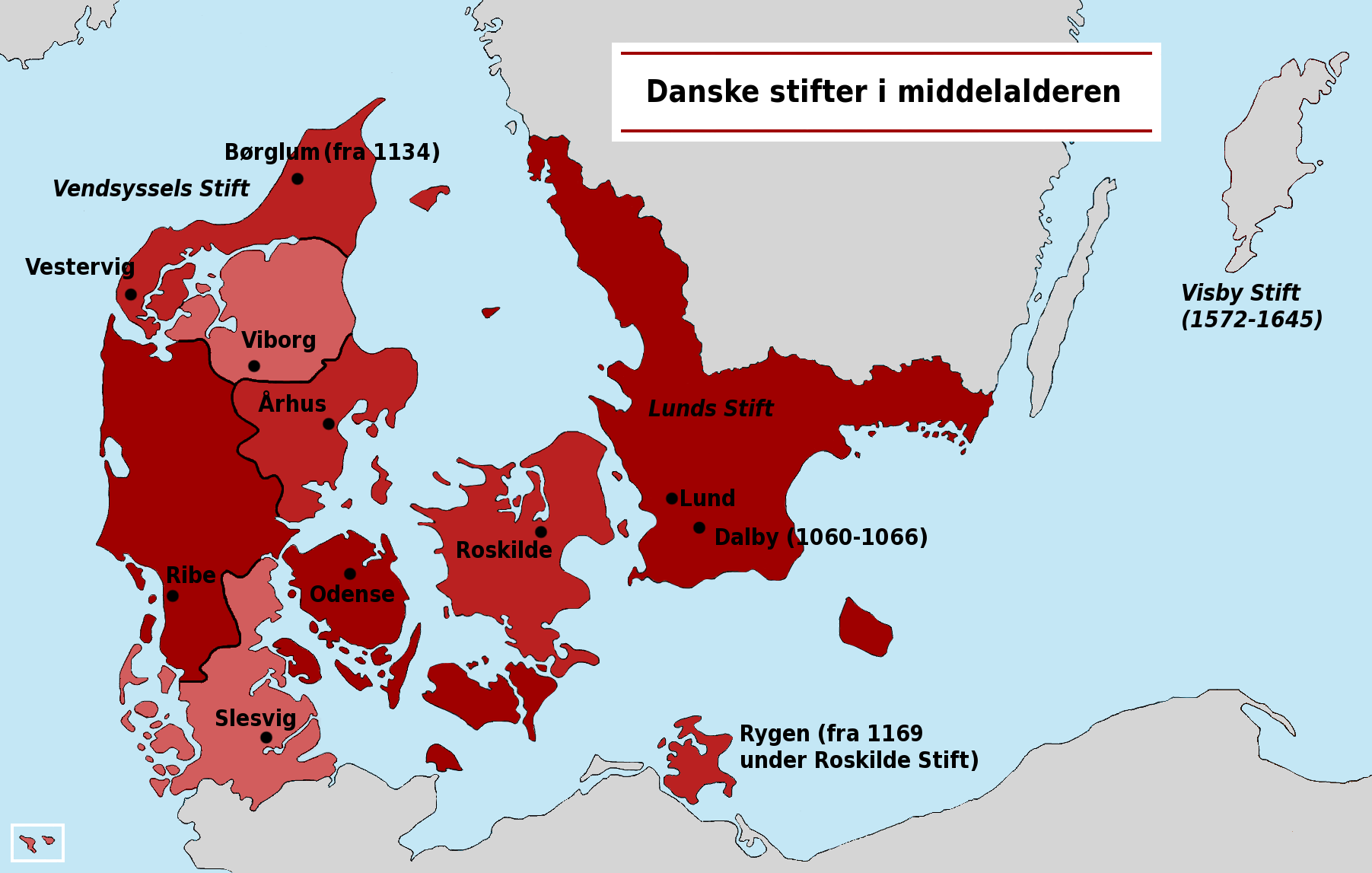
Danish dioceses in the middle ages

The Roman Catholic bishopric of Odense was established some time before 988. During the Reformation in 1536, the Catholic diocese dissolved and was replaced by the current Lutheran Diocese of Funen. The newly established diocese's first bishop was Jørgen Sadolin, a Protestant reformer who had preached in Odense before the Reformation.

In 1803, the region of Lolland-Falster split off from the diocese to form the Diocese of Lolland-Falster. The islands of Als and Ærø similarly split off in 1819 to form their own diocese, though this diocese was eventually dissolved. Æro came back under Funen's jurisdiction in 1864, while Als is now part of the Diocese of Haderslev. Today, the Diocese of Funen consists of the islands of Funen, Langeland, and Ærø.

As of 2020, the diocese consists of 11 subordinate deaneries (Danish: Provstier): Assens, Bogense, Fåborg, Hjallese, Kerteminde, Langeland-Ærø, Middlefart, Nyborg, Odense Sankt Knuds, Midtfyn, and Svendborg. These deaneries are further divided into 234 parishes with a total of 251 individual churches.

== List of bishops ==
- Jørgen Sadolin, 1537–1559
- Jacob Madsen Vejle, 1587–1606
- Hans Knudsen Vejle, 1606–1616
- Laurids Jacobsen Hindsholm, 1651–1663
- Niels Hansen Bang, 1663–1676
- Thomas Kingo, 1677–1703
- Christian Rudolf Müller, 1704–1712
- Christian Muus, 1712–1717
  - Vacant (1717–1732)
- Jacob Ramus, 1763–1785
- Tønne Bloch, 1786–1803
- Peder Hansen, 1804–1810
- Fredrik Plum, 1811–1834
- Nicolai Faber, 1834–1848
  - Vacant (1848–1851)
- Christian Thorning Engelsoft, 1851–1889
  - Vacant (1889–1900)
- Hans Valdemar Sthyr, 1900–1903
- Laurits Nicolai Balslev, 1903–1922
  - Vacant (1922–1958)
- Hans Øllgard, 1958
- Knud Christian Holm, 1958–1984
- Vincent Lind, 1984–1995
- Kresten Drejergaard, 1995–2012
- Tine Lindhardt, 2012–2023
- Mads Davidsen, 2023-present
