= Peder Hansen (bishop) =

Danish theologian and priest

Right Reverend Doctor Peder Hansen
- Bishop
- Church: Church of Norway; Church of Denmark
- Diocese: Christianssand and Funen
- Appointed: 1798
- In office: 1798–1810

Personal details
- Born: 8 May 1746 Copenhagen, Denmark
- Died: 26 October 1810 (aged 64) Odense, Denmark
- Denomination: Christian
- Occupation: Priest
- Education: University of Halle (D.Theol., 1793)

Peder Hansen (8 May 1746 – 26 October 1810) was a Danish theologian and priest. He served as a bishop in both Norway and in Denmark from 1798 until his death in 1810. Hansen is the elder brother to Christian Frederik Hansen, the famous Danish architect.

== Personal life ==
Peder Hansen was born on 8 May 1746 in Copenhagen, Denmark, the son of shoemaker Matthias Hansen (c.1708–1789) and his wife Anna Marie Malling (1716–1766). He was married three times. He married Marie Hedevig Runchel in 1771, but she died just four years later. In 1777, he married Abeline Marie Clausen, but she died about ten years later. His third marriage, in 1798, was to Juliane Marie Rasch, and she out-lived him by nearly 25 years. Peder Hansen was a brother of architect Christian Frederik Hansen. He died in October 1810 in Odense, Denmark.

== Education and career ==
He graduated with a diploma from the school in Copenhagen in 1768 and then received a royal scholarship to study abroad. He studied theology for two years at the University of Halle in Halle in Prussia and then spent a year at the University of Jena in Jena in Thuringia. In 1771, Hansen was hired as the assistant chaplain in Helsingør where he served the local castle, Kronborg and the local prison. In this role, he was able to preach to the imprisoned Queen Caroline Mathilde who was held in the castle prior to her divorce from the King.

In 1775, he was hired as the parish priest in Skanderborg. In 1779, he moved to Ringsted to become their parish priest. In 1780, was hired at the University of Halle as an extraordinary professor of theology. He was hired as the parish priest of the Helligåndskirken in the Danish capital of Copenhagen in 1787. He was called to Copenhagen with a mission of reforming the way the church worked in the poorest parts of the city. He received his doctorate in 1793 from the University of Halle.

In 1798, Peder Hansen was appointed as the Bishop of the Diocese of Christianssand (in Norway). He moved to Christianssand and served the church there until 1804. During that time, he was an opponent to the Haugean movement within the Church of Norway. He was also a great proponent of improving the schools in the diocese of Christianssand as well as improving the quality of teacher education in Norway. He held courses for teachers each year. In 1804, he was appointed to be the Bishop of the Diocese of Funen back in Denmark. He held that position until his death on 26 October 1810.

Church of Norway titles
Preceded by Hans Heinrich Tübring	Bishop of Christianssand; 1798–1804	Succeeded by Jens Bloch
Preceded by Tønne Bloch	Bishop of Funen; 1804–1810	Succeeded by Frederik Plum
