= Eiler Hansen Hagerup =

Norwegian theologian and priest

Right Reverend Eiler Hansen Hagerup
- Bishop
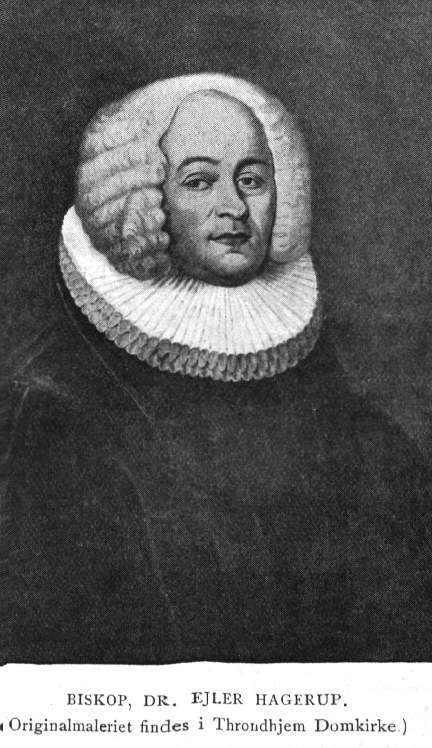
- Church: Church of Norway
- Diocese: Trondhjem

Personal details
- Born: 25 November 1685 Kvernes, Norway
- Died: 15 April 1743 (aged 57) Trondheim, Norway
- Denomination: Christian
- Parents: Hans Hansen Hagerup; Ellen Eilersdatter Schøller
- Spouse: Anna Cathrine Barhow (1715-1737)
- Occupation: Priest
- Education: Cand.theol. (1704)

Eiler Hansen Hagerup or Eiler Hagerup d.e. (25 November 1685 – 15 April 1743) was a Norwegian theologian and priest. He was the Bishop of the Diocese of Trondhjem from 1731 until his death in 1743.

== Personal life ==
Eiler Hagerup was born on 25 November 1685 in Kvernes in what is now Møre og Romsdal county, Norway. His parents were the priest Hans Hansen Hagerup and his wife Ellen Eilersdatter Schøller. He was married in 1715 to Anna Cathrine Barhow (1695–1737), daughter of parish priest, Amund Barhow (1660–1725). Together they had 17 children including Hans Hagerup Gyldenpalm, Eiler Hagerup, and Christian Frederik Hagerup.

The "d.e." at the end of his name means den eldre (English: the elder) to distinguish him from his younger nephew, Eiler Hagerup d.y. (1718- 1789), Bishop in the Diocese of Bjørgvin and later in Kristiansand.

== Education and career ==
He was a student at Trondheim Cathedral School. In 1702, he started at the University of Copenhagen and graduated with a Cand.theol. degree 1704. In 1709, he was hired as a chaplain in the parish of Kvernes where his father worked. After a few years, he was hired as the parish priest in Kalundborg, Denmark (1715–1727). In 1727, he became a lecturer in theology at Trondheim Cathedral School after the death of Thomas von Westen. In 1731, he was appointed Bishop of the Diocese of Nidaros as a replacement for Peder Krog. During his time as bishop, he was a good administrator and he was considered a demanding manager of church business. In a letter to the priests in his diocese, he made strict demands: the catechism should be taught and the young people should learn to read with the book. The scripture must be taken seriously, and the priests must visit all homes in their parish every year. An account of the poverty of the poor shall be made across the diocese. He made a great emphasis during his time as bishop of mission work among the Sami people in Northern Norway. Bishop Hagerup died in 1743 in Trondheim.

Church of Norway titles
Preceded by Peder Krog	Bishop of Trondhjem; 1731–1743	Succeeded by Ludvig Harboe
