= Erik Pontoppidan =

Danish author (1698–1764)

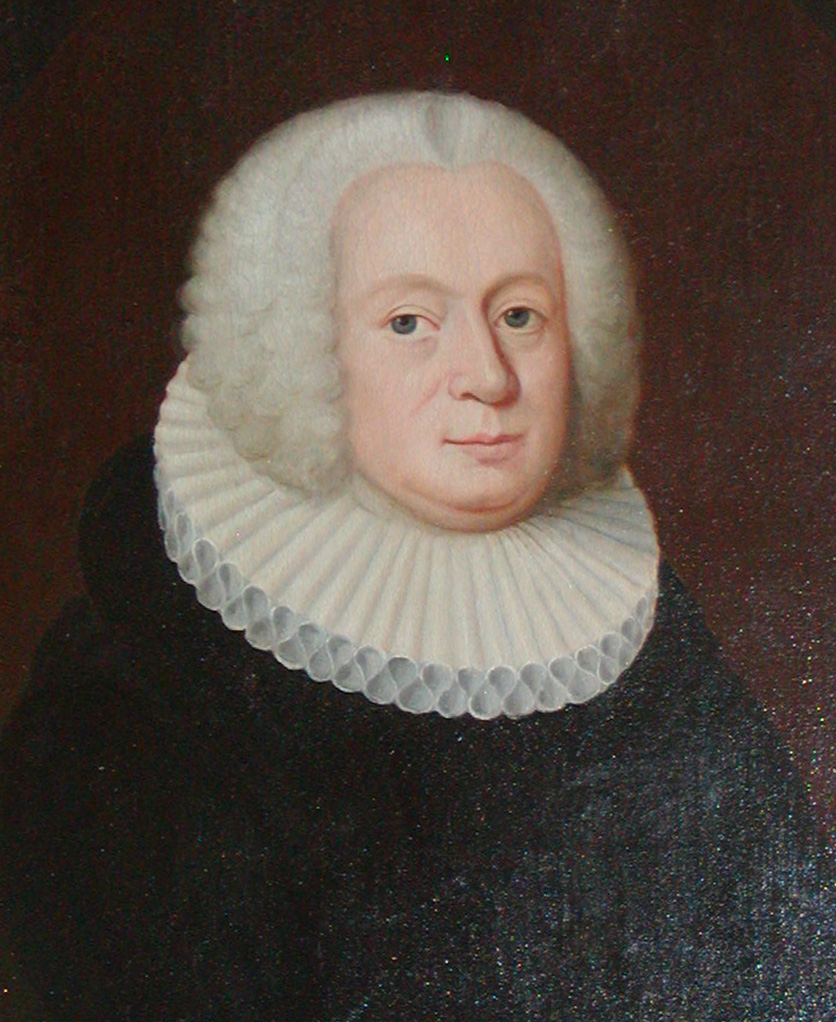
Erik Pontoppidan

Erik Ludvigsen Pontoppidan (24 August 1698 – 20 December 1764) was a Danish author, a Lutheran bishop of the Church of Norway, a historian, and an antiquarian. His Catechism of the Church of Denmark heavily influenced Danish and Norwegian religious thought and practice for roughly the next 200 years after its 1737 publication.

== Early life and education ==
Pontoppidan was born in Aarhus to provost Ludvig Henriksen Pontoppidan (1648–1706) and his second wife Else Sophie Spend (1673–1707). His younger brother Christian Ludvigsen Pontoppidan (1696–1765) was a provist (stiftsprovst) in Aarhus. His father's first wife was Barbara Backer (1646–1689). Orphaned at an early age, Erik Pontoppidan was placed in the house of a distant relative, Justice Councilor D.C. Braes to Kokkedal in Torslev parish and was mistreated by the home teacher, so in 1709, through the family's intervention, he first came to Aarhus Latin School and in 1710 to Fredericia Latin School, where he lived with his half-brother, parish priest Henrik Pontoppidan, who, when the boy found the school discipline unbearable, put him in the house with parish priest Ove Guldberg in Barrit 1713. In 1715 he returned to Fredericia Latin School, matriculating in 1716. He then enrolled at the University of Copenhagen to study theology, earning his certificate (attestats) in 1718.

== Career ==
Pontoppidan worked as a private tutor in Norway in 1719–1720. He was then engaged as hovmester for Ivar Huitfeldt's son Claus with whom he went to the Netherlands and England (1720–1721). During their stay in Utrecht, he came into personal contact with the then-influential reformed theologian Friedrich Adolph Lampe, whose theological thinking left an impression on him. In 1721 he became private tutor for Frederick Carl of Carlstein (later duke of Plön), and two years later morning preacher in the castle and afternoon preacher in Nordborg. From 1726 to 1734 he was pastor at Hagenberg, where he so protected the pietists as to find it advisable to defend his course against the Lutherans with Dialogus; oder Unterredung Severi, Sinceri, und Simplicis von der Religion and Reinheit der Lehre (1726) and Heller Glaubensspiegel (1727). During this same period he laid the foundation of his later topographical and historical works in Memoria Hafniæ (1729); Theatrum Daniæ (1736); and the aforementioned Kurzgefasste Reformationshistorie der dänischen Kirche. Pontoppidan became successively pastor in Hillerød and castle preacher in Frederiksborg (1734), Danish court preacher at Copenhagen (1735), professor extraordinary of theology at the University (1738), and a member of the mission board (1740), meanwhile writing his Everriculum fermenti veteris (1736) and Böse Sprichwörter (1739).

In 1736 Pontoppidan was directed by royal rescript to prepare an explanation of the catechism and a new hymnal, and through these two works — Sandhed til gudfrygtighed (1737) and the hymnbook (1740) — the pietistic cause in Denmark received powerful assistance. He likewise continued his historical investigations in his Marmora Danica (3 vols., 1739–1741; a collection of noteworthy epitaphs and ecclesiastical monuments) and his uncritical Annales ecclesiæ Danicæ (4 vols., 1741–1752); and also wrote a novel, Menoza (3 vols., 1742–1743), a critique of the religious conditions of Denmark and other countries. In 1747 he was appointed bishop at Bergen, where he introduced many educational reforms, and wrote Glossarium Norvagicum (1749) and Forsøk til Norges naturlige historie (Copenhagen, 1752–1753), while his pastoral letters formed in part the basis of his later Collegium pastorale practicum (1757). The antagonism which Pontoppidan roused at Bergen, however, obliged him to go in 1754 to Copenhagen, where he became prochancellor at the university in the following year. However, all his plans in this capacity were thwarted by his opponents, and he sought consolation in writing, the results being his Origines Hafnienses (1760) and the first two parts of his Den danske Atlas (1763–1767), of which the last five volumes were edited posthumously. He was also active as a political economist, being the editor of Danmarks og Norges ökonomiske Magazin (8 vols., 1757–1764).

== Sea serpents and giant squids ==
Pontoppidan argued for the existence of the sea serpent, the kraken and the mermaid in his two-volume work, Forsøk til Norges naturlige historie (The Natural History of Norway), published in 1752 and 1753.

Herman Melville, in his novel Moby-Dick, talks about "the great Kraken of Bishop Pontoppodan".

Jules Verne, in his novel Twenty Thousand Leagues Under the Seas, references this aspect of Pontoppidan's work. The narrator, Professor Aronnax, explains that "another bishop, Pontoppidan of Bergen, also tells of a devilfish so large a whole cavalry regiment could maneuver on it." Despite the skepticism of his companions, they soon encounter "a squid of colossal dimensions." See, also, his The Sea Serpent.

== Personal life ==
Pontoppidan was married three times. On 26 October 1723, he married Francisca Toxverd (died 1730). She was the daughter of minister Peder Frandsen Toxverd (died 1735). They had no children. Pontoppidan's second wife was Lina (Ellina) Danielsen (1712–1744), daughter of husfoged at Sønderborg Castle Peter Danielsen (1680–1735) and Ingeborg Thomsen (born 1690). The wedding took place on 4 September 1731 in Sønderborg. They had two sons and a daughter. The elder of the two sons, Christian Frederik Pontoppidan (1730–1816), was a counter admiral. Pontoppidan 's third wife was Johanne Marie de Hofman (1722–1809), daughter of Justice Councillor Søren de Hofman til Skerrildgård (1688–1771) and Karen Elisabeth Dreyer (1689–1727). The wedding took place on 16 February 1745. They had three daughters and three sons. The son Carl Pontoppidan (1748–1802) served as director of the Royal Greenland Trading Department and was a councilman in Copenhagen.

== Influence ==
Pontoppidan's Heller Glaubensspiegel was an influence on Swedish Lutheran lay preacher Carl Olof Rosenius, impressing upon him the importance of conversion and having a living faith.

== Notes ==
Church of Norway titles
| Preceded by Oluf Cosmussen Bornemann | Bishop of Bjørgvin; 1747–1757 | Succeeded by Ole Tidemand |
