= Ludvig Stoud =

Right Reverend Ludvig Stoud
- Bishop
- Church: Church of Norway
- Diocese: Diocese of Christianssand

Personal details
- Born: 25 April 1649 Bergen, Norway
- Died: 28 August 1705 (aged 56) Christianssand, Norway
- Denomination: Christian
- Occupation: Priest
- Education: Master's degree (1763)
- Alma mater: University of Copenhagen

Ludvig Stoud (25 April 1649–28 August 1705) was a Danish-Norwegian theologian and priest. He served as a bishop of the Diocese of Christianssand from 1699 until his death in 1705. He spent much time and effort as Bishop trying to eradicate the heathen and Catholic remnants in southern Norway.

== Personal life ==
Ludvig Stoud was born in Bergen, Norway on 25 April 1649 to Otto Rasmussen Stoud (the first priest at the Nykirken) and his wife Cathrine Munthe. He was first married in 1673 in Holbæk with Maren May, the cousin of Peder Griffenfeld. She died after four years of marriage. In 1678, he married Sophie von Angel. He had a fiery temperament and was uncommonly tall and skinny. He often had to bend to get through doorways.

== Education and career ==
He went to school in Bergen, and took his exams in 1669. That same year, he traveled to Holland, England, and France to study at foreign universities. He returned home in 1672 and graduated with a magister's degree in 1673 from the University of Copenhagen. That same year, he was hired as an assistant priest in Holbæk, Denmark. In 1676, Stoud was hired as the dean and parish priest for St. Canute's Cathedral in Odense. In 1699, he was appointed by the King of Denmark-Norway to be the Bishop of the Diocese of Christianssand in Norway. He worked as bishop until his death on 28 August 1705.

Church of Norway titles
Preceded by Hans Munch	Bishop of Christianssand; 1699–1705	Succeeded by Jens Bircherod
