= Jens Bircherod =

Danish theologian (1664–1720)

Right Reverend Jens Bircherod
- Bishop
- Church: Church of Norway
- Diocese: Diocese of Christianssand

Personal details
- Born: 3 February 1664 Copenhagen, Denmark
- Died: 25 January 1720 (aged 55) Christianssand, Norway
- Denomination: Christian
- Occupation: Priest

Jens Bircherod (3 February 1664–25 January 1720) was a Danish theologian and priest. He served as a bishop of the Diocese of Christianssand from 1705 until his death in 1720.

== Personal life ==
Jens Bircherod was born on 3 February 1664 in Copenhagen, Denmark. His parents were the priest Jens Jensen Bircherod and his first wife. He was married to Elen Dorthea Lemvig.

== Education and career ==
He received a private education in Copenhagen finishing in 1679. In 1680, he received his baccalaureate degree. He then went on to travel to some foreign universities, returning home in 1688 and graduated with a magister's degree. In 1689, he was hired as the parish priest for Gladsaxe. In 1705, he was appointed to be the Bishop of the Diocese of Christianssand. He held that post until his death on 25 January 1720 in Christianssand, Norway.

Church of Norway titles
Preceded by Ludvig Stoud	Bishop of Christianssand; 1705–1720	Succeeded by Christopher Nyrop
