= Agder Natural History Museum and Botanical Garden =

Museum in Kristiansand, Norway

Coordinates: 58.158861°N 8.003657°E

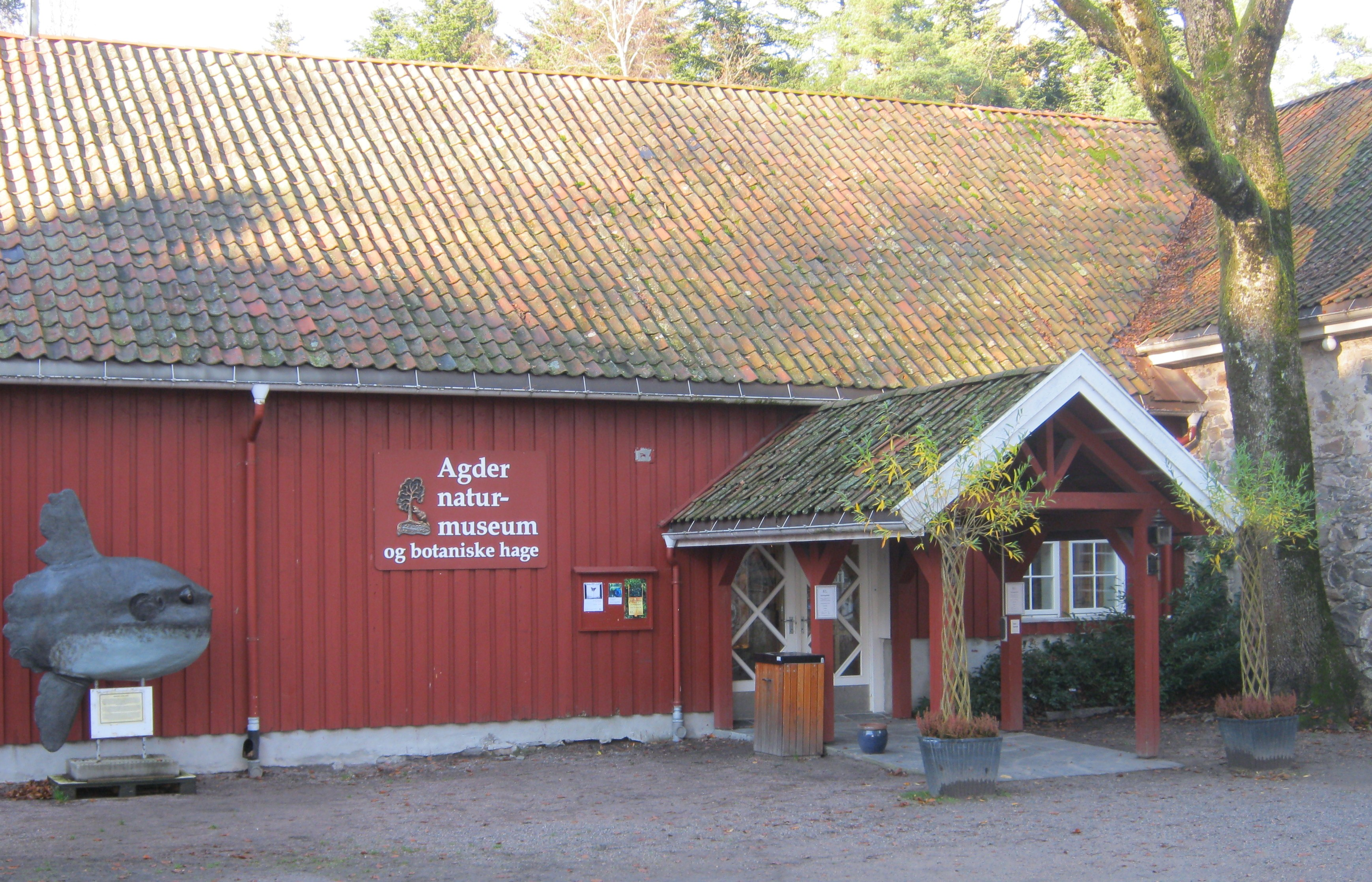
Entrance to Agder Natural History Museum and Botanical Garden

Natural History Museum and Botanical Garden, University of Agder (Norwegian :Naturmuseum og botanisk hage, Universitetet i Agder, formerly Kristiansand Museum and Agder Natural History Museum) is the only natural history museum on the Southern Coast of Norway, located in Kristiansand in Vest-Agder County.

== History ==
The museum known as Kristiansand Museum was founded in 1828 as part of Kristiansand Katedralskole. The current museum and botanical garden is run by the University of Agder.

Today the natural history museum and botanical garden are located in the former farm Gimle Gård, with the museum in the outbuildings and the former park serving as a botanical garden. The former manor house of Gimle Gård also houses a museum which is part of Vest-Agder-Museum (Vest-Agder-museet) .

== Permanent exhibits ==
The permanent exhibits are from the early 1990s. The museum's current exhibition space was opened by the then Crown Prince Harald 26 June 1990. Focus is placed on the topics: "from the Ice Age to the Present" and "from sea to the mountains". In addition, there is an exhibition on "minerals and rocks". In addition to these, exhibitions are shown in limited periods.

== Botanical garden ==
The botanical garden consists of plants both outside and indoors. Inside there is the largest collection of succulents in Norway, the issues are many and varied. Themes vary from year to year. The botanical garden is a source of knowledge, beauty, adventure and of course recreation, and includes all green spaces of Gimle Gård.

Botanical Garden consists of exotic pitcher plants framing the garden, carnivorous plants, herbs, nectar garden and a popular children's playground.

The garden contains various plant collections. There is an old park in the free English landscape style, historic rose garden, rose garden and modern roses, South Norwegian rose garden, millenniumgarden, conifers collection (arboretum), shrubs and trees at the museum's parking lot (lignoses), perennials, rock garden, pond with water plants, heather garden and a collection of Rhododendron.

== See also ==
- Vest-Agder Museum Kristiansand
