= Eiler Eilersen Hagerup =

Norwegian theologian and priest

Right Reverend Doctor Eiler Eilersen Hagerup
- Bishop
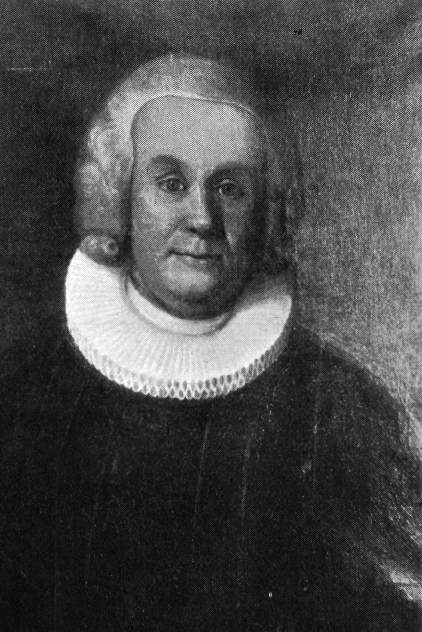
- Church: Church of Denmark; Church of Norway
- Diocese: Ribe, Bjørgvin, and Christianssand

Personal details
- Born: Eiler Eilersen Kongel; 11 December 1718 Kvernes, Norway
- Died: 27 March 1789 (aged 70) Christianssand, Norway
- Denomination: Christian
- Children: Edvard Hagerup
- Occupation: Priest
- Education: D.Theol.

Eiler Eilersen Hagerup (sometimes Eiler Hagerup d.y.) was a Norwegian theologian and priest. He served as a bishop in the Church of Norway, first in the Diocese of Bjørgvin from 1774 until 1778 and then in the Diocese of Christianssand from 1778 until his death in 1789.

== Personal life ==
He was born and raised in Kvernes, on a coastal island in Nordmøre, Norway on 11 December 1718. His parents were the trader Eiler Bertelsen Kongel and Laurentze Hansdatter Stub (1688-1751), who was the granddaughter of the priest Kjeld Stub. Eiler Hagerup was married first to Johanne Margrethe Smith from Stavanger in 1752. She died during 1773 and then in 1777, Hagerup married Edvardine Magdalene Margrethe Christie.

He took the surname "Hagerup" due to living with relatives of that name for nearly a decade. He is sometimes termed Eiler Hagerup den yngre or Eiler Hagerup d.y. The "den yngre" or "d.y." translates as "the younger", to distinguish him from his uncle, the Bishop Eiler Hagerup d.e. (with "d.e." or "den eldre", meaning "the elder").

== Education and career ==
During 1730 (at the age of 12), he became a servant in the household of his uncle, Eiler Hagerup d.e., the bishop of the Diocese of Nidaros. Here was also taught by his older cousin Hans Hagerup Gyldenpalm, who later became the Amtmann for Lister og Mandals amt. He spent time studying theology in Copenhagen and graduated with a Magister degree in 1740. In 1743, he became the parish priest to Høyland Church parish on Jæren. In 1753, he became the dean of the Jæren prosti. In 1756, he relocated to the city of Arendal to serve as the parish priest and he stayed there for a long time. He received his doctor of theology degree during 1760. In 1773, the King of Denmark-Norway appointed him to be the Bishop of the Danish Diocese of Ribe. This, however, was short-lived; about a year later, he relocated to Bergen in Norway to become the Bishop of the Diocese of Bjørgvin. He served in Bergen from 1774 until 1778 when he was appointed to be the Bishop of the Diocese of Christianssand, an assignment he had until his death on 27 March 1789.

Church of Norway titles
Preceded by Frederik Arentz	Bishop of Bjørgvin; 1774–1778	Succeeded by Søren Friedlieb
Preceded by Ole Tidemand	Bishop of Christianssand; 1778–1789	Succeeded by Hans Heinrich Tübring
