= Christopher Nyrop =

Norwegian theologian and priest

Right Reverend Christopher Nyrop
- Bishop
- Church: Church of Norway
- Diocese: Diocese of Christianssand

Personal details
- Born: 29 March 1680 Lødingen, Norway
- Died: 29 March 1733 (aged 53) Christianssand, Norway
- Denomination: Christian
- Occupation: Priest

Christopher Nyrop (29 March 1680–29 March 1733) was a Norwegian theologian and priest. He served as a bishop of the Diocese of Christianssand from 1720 until his death in 1733.

== Personal life ==
Christopher Nyrop was born on 29 March 1680 in Lødingen, Norway. His parents were the priest Hans Nyrop and his wife Benedicte Mikkelsdatter Storm. Nyrop was married in 1706 to Malene Glad, but she died about a year later. He then married Elisabeth Kirstine Hiort. Both wives were daughters of priests. Christopher Nyrop died on his 53rd birthday, 29 March 1733 in Christianssand, Norway.

== Education and career ==
Nyrop attended school in Bergen, graduating in 1697 and completing his exams in 1700. In 1705, he was hired as a chaplain in the parish of Eid Church, based in Nordfjordeid. It was here that he met his first wife, she was the daughter of the parish priest for Eid, Poul Glad. In 1708, he was sentenced for document forgery, so he left Norway and moved to Copenhagen. He got a job in 1710 as a ship's priest. In 1711, he was hired as the parish priest of Herrested on the island of Fyn. In 1714, he was hired as the parish priest in the nearby city of Nyborg, the same year, he earned his master's degree. On 21 June 1720, he was named to the office of Bishop of the Diocese of Christianssand back in Norway. He was described as a wise leader, who was clever and eloquent and was like a father to his priests. He was also authoritative and orthodox, resisting the pietist movement that was beginning during his time as bishop. He held that position until his death on 29 March 1733 in Christianssand, Norway.

Church of Norway titles
Preceded by Jens Bircherod	Bishop of Christianssand; 1720–1733	Succeeded by Jacob Kærup
