= Jens Christian Spidberg =

Norwegian bishop and natural scientist (1684–1762)

Right Reverend Doctor Jens Christian Spidberg
- Bishop
- Church: Church of Norway
- Diocese: Diocese of Christianssand

Personal details
- Born: 8 December 1684 Skiptvet, Norway
- Died: 4 April 1762 (aged 77) Christianssand, Norway
- Denomination: Christian
- Occupation: Priest
- Education: Dr.Theol. (1760)
- Alma mater: University of Copenhagen

Jens Christian Spidberg was a Norwegian theologian and priest. He served as a bishop of the Diocese of Christianssand from 1759 until 1762. He was also a noted cartographer and student of the natural sciences. He wrote a dissertation that tried to reconcile theology and the natural sciences. He particularly spent time studying the northern lights, earthquakes, and volcanoes.

== Personal life and education ==
Jens Christian Spidberg was born on 8 December 1684 in Skiptvet, Norway to the parish priest Anders Lauritsen Spidberg and his wife Susanne Olufsdatter. He was married in 1728 in Christianssand to Birgitte Topdal. He was educated at home and he took his theology exam in 1708 while studying in Copenhagen. After graduation, he spent some time studying abroad at the University of Kiel and the University of Groningen. He earned his Master's degree in 1722. He received his doctorate from the University of Copenhagen in 1760.

== Career ==
In 1710, Spidberg was hired as the chaplain in his father's parish in Spydeberg. The following year, he got a job as a military chaplain in Bohuslän during the Great Northern War. He was stationed in Tanum (in what is now part of Sweden). After some time, he became the ship's priest on the flagship of the navy of Denmark-Norway, Elephanten. This put him in contact with many high ranking military and government officials. In 1721, he was named the Dean of the Kristiansand domprosti and Mandal prosti (deaneries). In 1759, he was appointed to be the Bishop of the Diocese of Christianssand.

Church of Norway titles
Preceded by Rasmus Paludan	Bishop of Christianssand; 1759–1762	Succeeded by Ole Tidemand
