= Kristiansand Cathedral =

Cathedral in Agder, Norway

- Kristiansand domkirke
- Kristiansand Cathedral
- 58.1461°N 07.9947°E
- Location: Kristiansand Municipality, Agder
- Country: Norway
- Denomination: Church of Norway
- Churchmanship: Evangelical Lutheran
- Website: kristiansanddomkirke.no

History
- Former name(s): Trefoldighetskirken (Trinity Church); Vor Frelsers kirke (Our Saviour's Church)
- Status: Cathedral
- Founded: 1645
- Consecrated: 18 Mar 1885

Architecture
- Functional status: Active
- Architect: Henrik Thrap-Meyer
- Architectural type: Cruciform
- Style: Neo-Gothic
- Completed: 1 February 1885 (141 years ago)

Specifications
- Capacity: 1000
- Materials: Brick

Administration
- Diocese: Agder og Telemark
- Deanery: Kristiansand domprosti
- Parish: Kristiansand domkirken
- Norwegian Cultural Heritage Site
- Type: Church
- Status: Listed
- ID: 84836

Kristiansand Cathedral (Norwegian: Kristiansand domkirke) is a cathedral of the Church of Norway in Kristiansand Municipality in Agder county, Norway. It is located in the Kvadraturen area in the central part of the city of Kristiansand. It is the church for the Kristiansand domkirken parish which is the seat of the Kristiansand domprosti (arch-deanery) in the Diocese of Agder og Telemark. The cathedral is also the seat of the Bishop of Agder and Telemark. The gray, brick church was built in a Neo-Gothic cruciform design in 1885 using plans drawn up by the architect Henrik Thrap-Meyer. The church seats about 1,000 people, making it one of the largest cathedrals in Norway. This cathedral is the fourth church and third cathedral to be located on this site over the centuries.

== Overview ==
Kristiansand Cathedral is a Neo-Gothic church built of brick and cement in a cruciform plan with 1,750 seats. The church was designed by the architect Henrik Thrap-Meyer. Construction began in 1880 and was completed on 1 February 1885. The church was consecrated on 18 March 1885 by the provost Johan M. Brun who was serving as acting bishop.

The cathedral is 60 metres (200 ft) long and 38.7 metres (127 ft) wide. The steeple is 70 metres (230 ft) in height. Originally the cathedral had 2,029 seats and room for an additional 1,216 people to stand, but seating has now been reduced so the building can comfortably seat about 1,000. To re-use the walls of the previous cathedral, which burned down in 1880, the altar was positioned at the west end, rather than in the traditional position in the east.

The cathedral received a carillon with 36 bells as a gift from Falconbridge Nikkelverk in 1990, created by Olsen Nauen Bell Foundry.

Kristiansand Cathedral received a new church organ, built by the German supplier Klais in 2013, comprising a 58-voice main organ at the eastern balcony and another of 9 voices at the northern balcony.

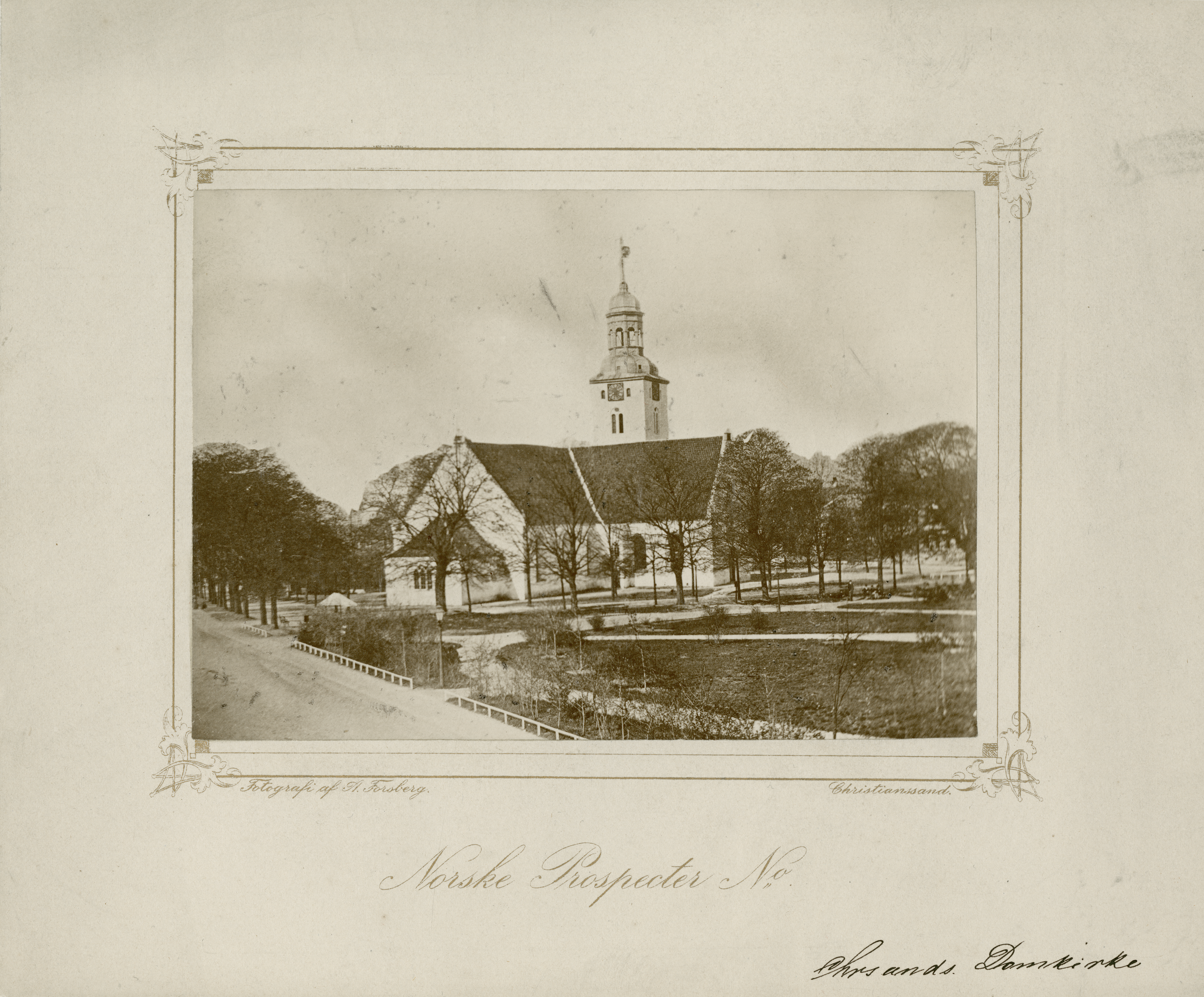
The previous Kristiansand Cathedral, built 1738, burned down 1880 (Image:Norwegian Directorate for Cultural Heritage)

== History ==
The cathedral is in the same location as three previous buildings. The first, called Trefoldigetskirken (Trinity Church), a small wooden church, was built in 1645. When Kristiansand was appointed the seat of the diocese in 1682, construction began on the town's first cathedral, called Vor Frelsers Kirke (Our Saviour's Church). That first cathedral, built in stone, was consecrated in 1696, but burned down in 1734. The second cathedral, Vor Frues Kirke (Our Lady's Church), consecrated in 1738, was destroyed by a fire that affected the whole city, on 18 December 1880. This cathedral has been reconstructed and rebuilt in size 1:10. The model is on display at the Vest-Agder Museum Kristiansand. It was built by a group of enthusiastic model builders.

The current cathedral, which is larger than its predecessors, was consecrated in 1885. When the 1940 Nazi attack on Kristiansand took place early in the morning of 9 April 1940, the 70-metre (230 ft)-tall cathedral tower was hit by an artillery shell, which damaged the upper part.

== Gallery ==
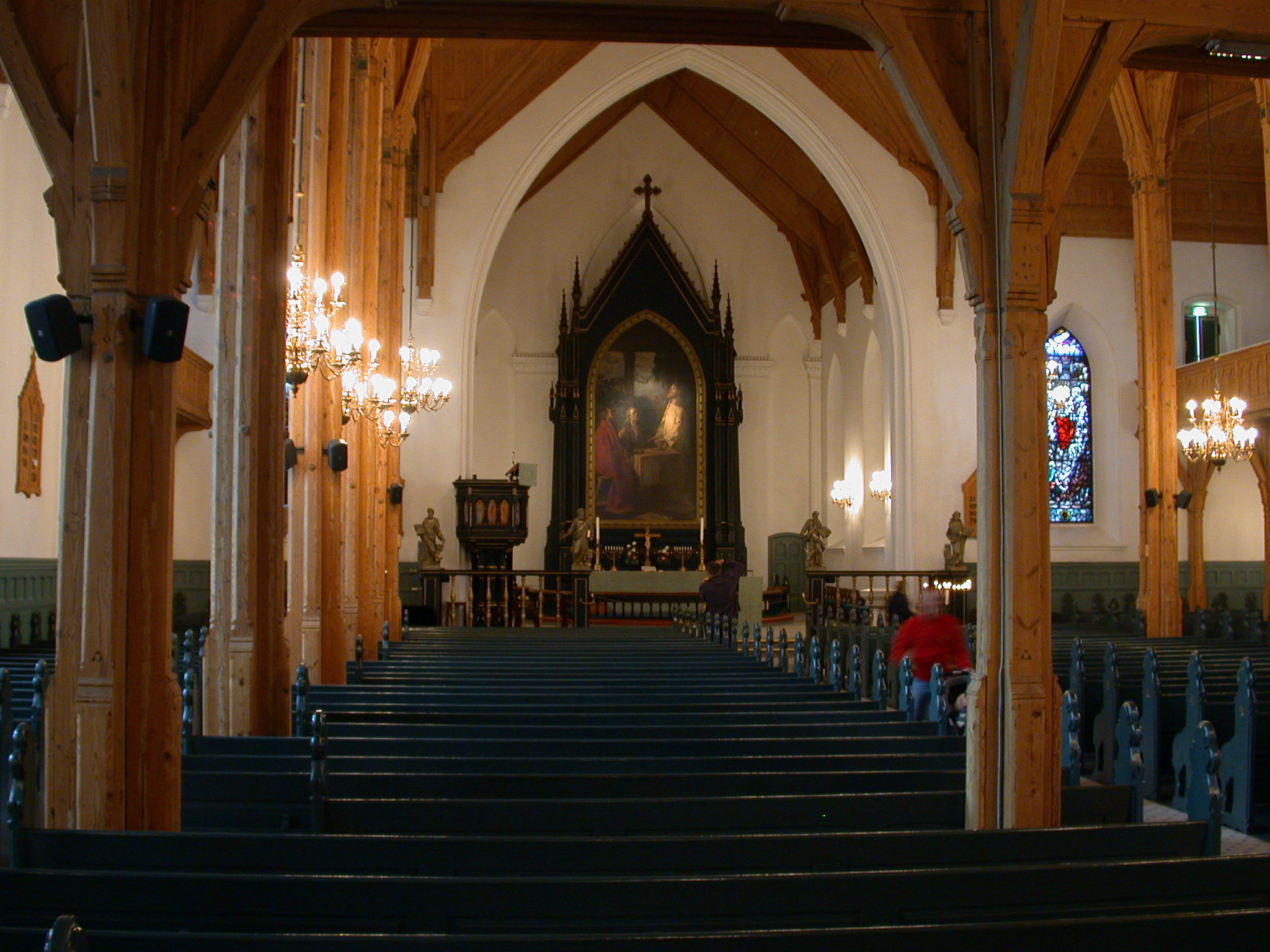
Interior

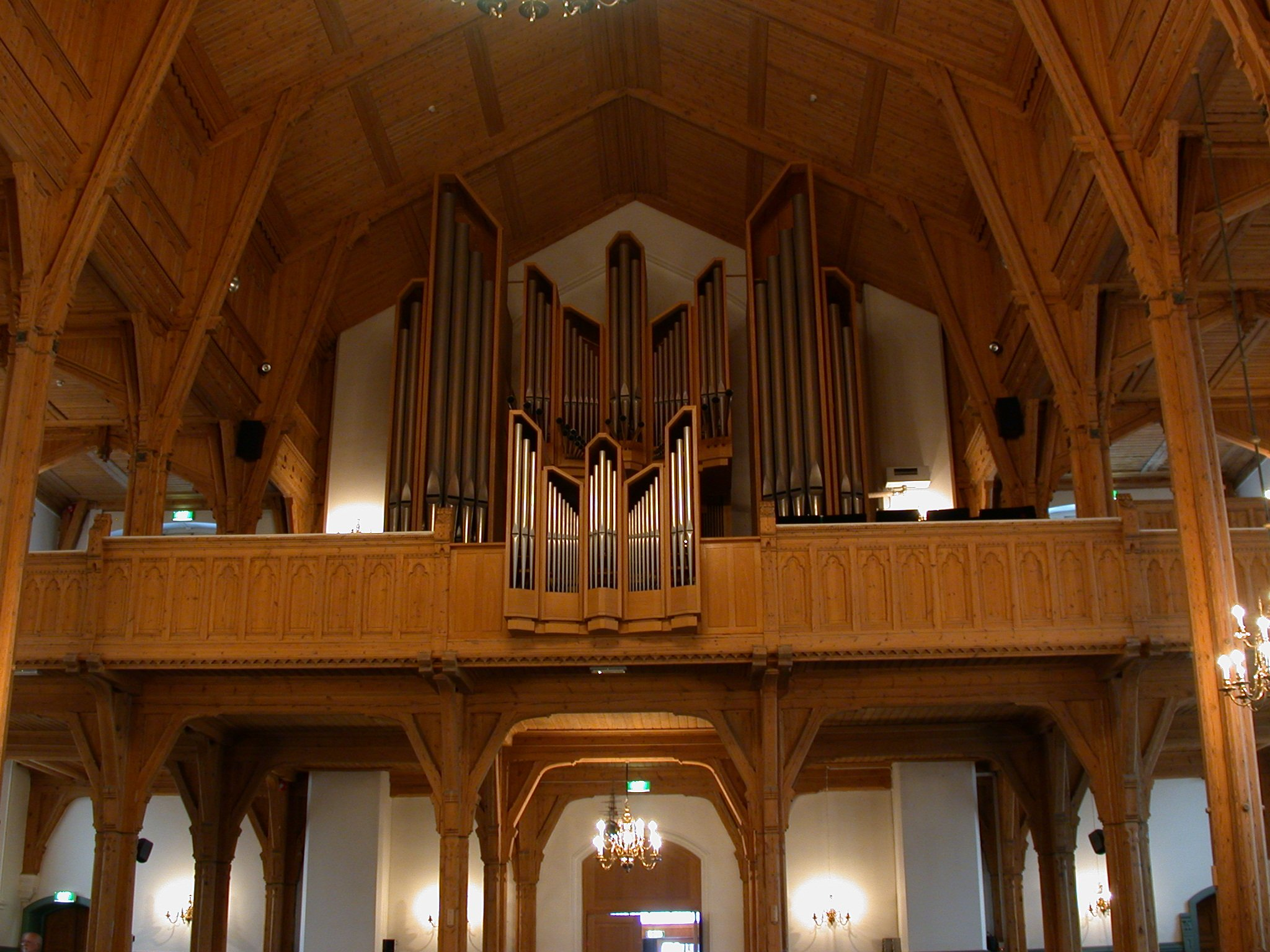
Organ

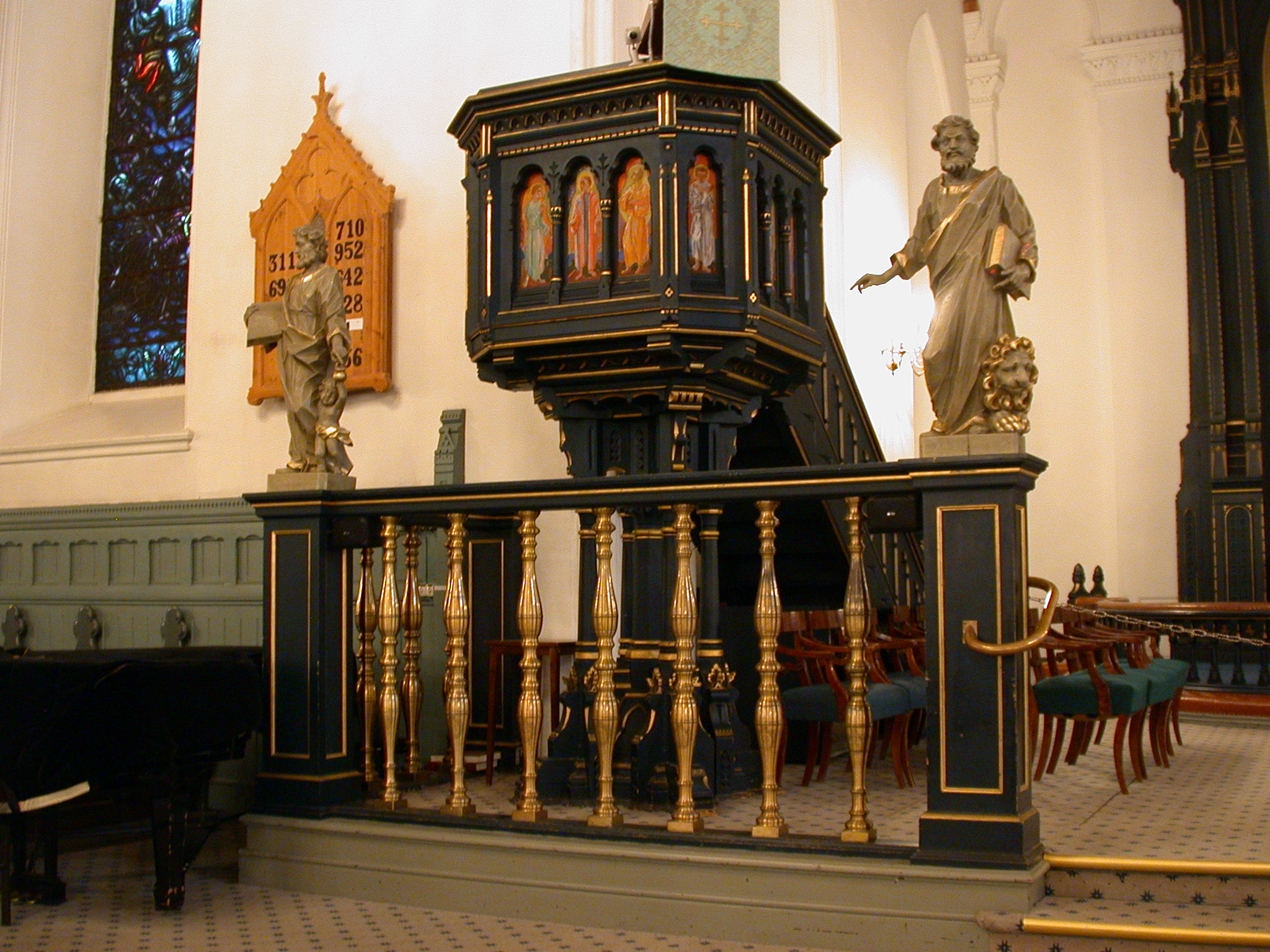
Pulpit

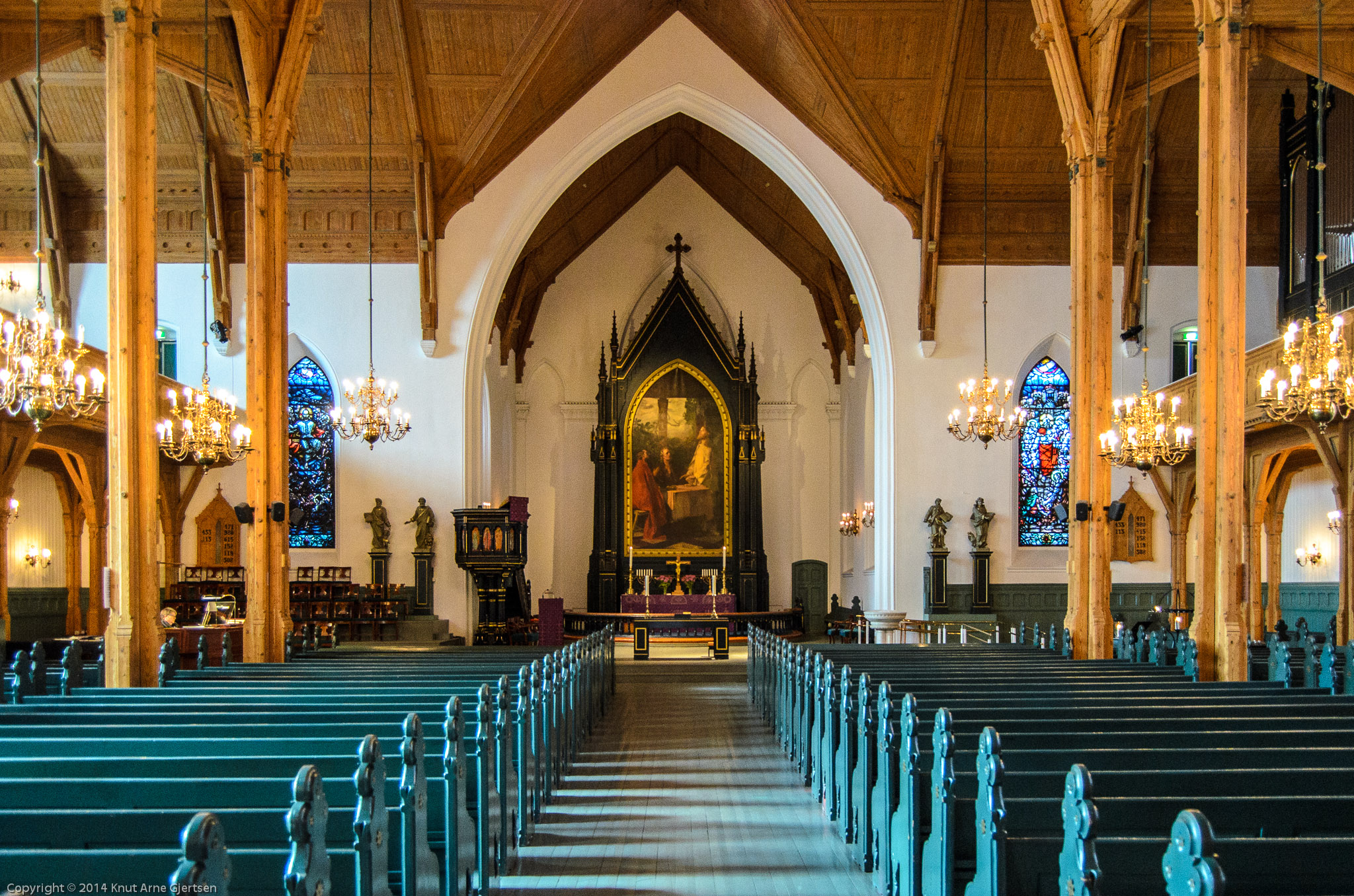
Sanctuary

== See also ==
- List of cathedrals in Norway
- List of churches in Agder og Telemark
