= Diocese of Agder og Telemark =

Diocese of the Church of Norway

Diocese of Agder og Telemark Agder og Telemark bispedomme
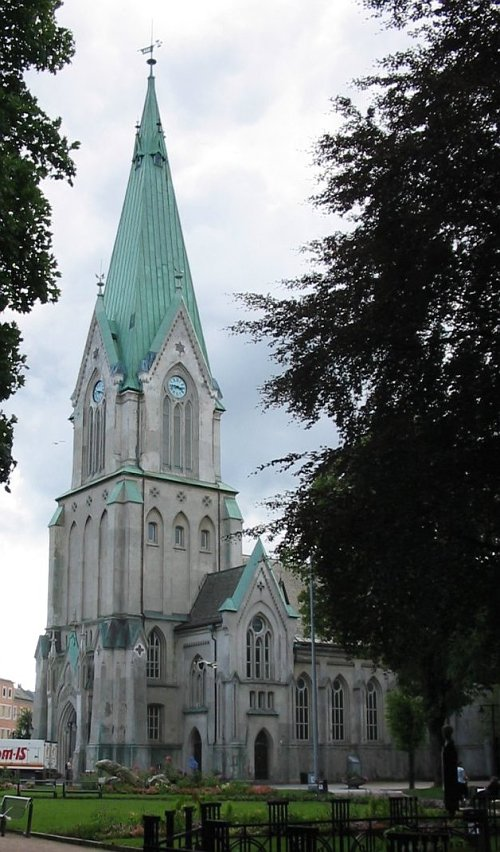
- View of the Kristiansand Cathedral

Location
- Country: Norway
- Territory: Agder, Telemark
- Deaneries: Kristiansand domprosti, Arendal, Aust-Nedenes, Bamble, Lister og Mandal, Otredal, Skien, Vest-Nedenes, Øvre Telemark
- Coordinates: 58.1667°N 8°E

Statistics
- Parishes: 135
- Members: 334,278

Information
- Denomination: Church of Norway
- Established: 1682
- Cathedral: Kristiansand Cathedral

Current leadership
- Bishop: Stein Reinertsen

Map
- Location of the Diocese of Agder og Telemark

Website
- kirken.no/agder

The Diocese of Agder og Telemark (Norwegian: Agder og Telemark bispedømme) is a diocese of the Church of Norway, covering all of Agder county and Telemark county in Norway. The cathedral city is Kristiansand, Norway's fifth largest city. Kristiansand Cathedral serves as the seat of the presiding Bishop. The bishop since 2013 has been Stein Reinertsen. As of 1 January 2003, there were 347,324 members of the Church of Norway in the diocese.

== History ==
In 1125, the southern part of the Ancient Diocese of Bergen was split off as the Ancient Diocese of Stavanger. This new diocese stretched from the coast of Haugesund in the west to Gjernestangen between Risør and Kragerø, later the border stretched to Eidanger in the east. Stavanger was the cathedral city. During the Protestant Reformation, Norway became a Lutheran nation, establishing the Church of Norway. The diocesan boundaries remained the same.

Over time, however, the diocese was reduced in size. The parish of Eidfjord was transferred to the neighboring Diocese of Bjørgvin in 1630. The regions of Valdres and Hallingdal were transferred to the Diocese of Oslo in 1631, but in exchange, the Diocese of Oslo had to give the upper part of Telemark and transfer that to the Diocese of Stavanger.

In 1682 Christian V, King of Denmark-Norway, issued an order that the Bishop and the Prefect of the Diocese of Stavanger were to be moved to the Christianssand Cathedral, which had been consecrated in 1646 and which the King intended be perfect site for a new cathedral. The citizens of Stavanger protested, with the Prefect and the Bishop refusing to move and ignoring the order. It took two years before Christianssand was established as the new cathedral city. The diocese was renamed Diocese of Christianssand (Norwegian: "Christiansands stift").

On 1 January 1925, the Diocese of Kristiansand was divided and all of the diocese located in Rogaland county was moved to the newly re-established Diocese of Stavanger and the Stavanger Cathedral regained its place as the seat of a bishop. The remainder of the diocese was renamed "Diocese of Agder" and it continued to serve the counties of Aust-Agder, Vest-Agder, and Telemark. In 2005 the diocese was renamed again as the "Diocese of Agder og Telemark" to fully reflect the areas included in the diocese.

== Kristiansand Cathedral ==
Kristiansand Cathedral is the headquarters of the Diocese of Agder and Telemark and it is the main parish church for the city of Kristiansand. In 1682, there was a small church built of wood on site in Kristiansand. A new cathedral was built of stone and consecrated by Bishop Hans Munch in 1696, but burned down in 1734. The city's second cathedral was consecrated in 1738 by Bishop Jacob Kærup. This cathedral was destroyed in the city fire of 1880.

The present church is the third cathedral in the city and the fourth church in the town square in Kristiansand. The church was built after a drawing by the architect Henrik Thrap-Meyer. The church is described as neo-Gothic style. The building is 70 metres (230 ft) long and 39 metres (128 ft) wide, and the tower is 70 metres (230 ft) high. The cathedral has a beautiful wooden ceiling and six beautiful stained glass windows with Biblical themes.

In order to exploit the ancient walls of the church that burned in 1880, the altar was placed against the west, while the churches generally tend to have the altar in the east. Building work was completed on 1 February 1885. The church was consecrated on 18 March 1885 with Johan M. Brun as acting bishop.

== Structure ==
The diocese is administratively divided into 9 deaneries spread out over two counties. Each deanery corresponds to one or more municipalities in the diocese. Each municipality has its own church council (Norwegian: kirkelige fellesråd}) and municipalities are made up of one or more parishes, each of which may contain one or more congregations. See each municipality below for lists of churches and parishes within them.

County	Deanery (Prosti)	Municipalities
Agder	Kristiansand domprosti	Kristiansand
Agder	Arendal prosti	Arendal, Froland
Agder	Aust-Nedenes prosti	Gjerstad, Risør, Tvedestrand, Vegårshei, Åmli
Agder	Lister og Mandal prosti	Farsund, Flekkefjord, Hægebostad, Kvinesdal, Lindesnes, Lyngdal, Sirdal
Agder	Otredal prosti	Bygland, Bykle, Evje og Hornnes, Iveland, Valle, Vennesla, Åseral
Agder	Vest-Nedenes prosti	Birkenes, Grimstad, Lillesand
Telemark	Bamble prosti	Bamble, Drangedal, Kragerø
Telemark	Skien prosti	Porsgrunn, Siljan, Skien
Telemark	Øvre Telemark prosti	Fyresdal, Hjartdal, Kviteseid, Midt-Telemark, Nissedal, Nome, Notodden, Seljord, Tinn, Tokke, Vinje

== Bishops ==
- 1681–1694 Jacob Jensen Jersin
- 1694–1699 Hans Munch
- 1699–1705 Ludvig Stoud
- 1705–1720 Jens Bircherod
- 1720–1733 Christopher Nyrop
- 1733–1751 Jacob Kærup
- 1751–1759 Rasmus Paludan
- 1759–1762 Jens Christian Spidberg
- 1762–1778 Ole Tidemand
- 1778–1789 Eiler Hagerup d.y.
- 1789–1798 Hans Heinrich Tübring
- 1798–1804 Peder Hansen
- 1804–1805 Jens Bloch
- 1805–1810 Johan Michael Keyser
- 1811–1823 Christian Sørenssen
- 1823–1832 Johan Storm Munch
- 1832–1840 Mathias Sigwardt
- 1841–1874 Jacob von der Lippe
- 1874–1881 Jørgen Engebretsen Moe
- 1882–1884 Jørgen Johan Tandberg
- 1885–1889 Jakob Sverdrup Smitt
- 1889–1904 Johan Christian Heuch
- 1904–1908 Gunvald Thorkildsen
- 1908–1913 Kristian Vilhelm Koren Schjelderup, Sr.
- 1914–1930 Bernt Støylen
- 1930–1946 James Maroni
- 1946–1951 Johannes Smemo
- 1951–1957 Johannes Smidt
- 1957–1973 Kaare Støylen
- 1973–1983 Erling Utnem
- 1983–1998 Halvor Bergan
- 1998–2012 Olav Skjevesland
- Since 2013 Stein Reinertsen
