= Ole Tidemand =

Right Reverend Doctor Ole Tidemand
- Bishop
- Church: Church of Norway
- Diocese: Diocese of Bjørgvin; Diocese of Christianssand
- Appointed: 1755
- In office: 1755–1778

Personal details
- Born: 31 October 1710 Christiania, Norway
- Died: 9 January 1778 (aged 67) Christianssand, Norway
- Denomination: Christian
- Occupation: Priest
- Education: Dr.Theol. (1760)

Ole Tidemand (31 October 1710–9 January 1778) was a Norwegian theologian and priest. He served as a bishop of the Diocese of Bjørgvin from 1757 until 1762 and then Bishop of the Diocese of Christianssand from 1762 until 1778. Bishop Tidemand always had powerful friends in Copenhagen, the capital of the Kingdom of Denmark-Norway. Most notably, the Dowager Queen Juliana Maria was a supporter of his. Tidemand was a student and colleague of Bishop Erik Pontoppidan and a leader in the pietist movement in Norway.

== Personal life ==
Ole Tidemand was born on 31 October 1710 in Christiania, Norway. He was the son of a merchant Iver Tidemand and his wife Elisabeth Olufsdatter. In 1732, he hastily married the young 13-year-old daughter of the priest with which he worked and soon after she gave birth to his first child. Her name was Charlotta Eleonora Calundan and together they had 10 children.

== Education and career ==
Tidemand graduated from the Fødebys School in 1728. In 1731, he graduated with theology diploma. During his studies, he worked with the parish priest Christian Callundan in Sandeherred teaching his children (and he married this priest's daughter). In 1732, he became a chaplain in Larvik under the dean Frederik Grüner. In 1741, he was called to be the parish priest in Hedrum. Two years later in 1743, he moved to Bergen to be the chaplain of the Nykirken. In 1747, he was hired as the dean of the Bergen Cathedral. In 1755, the Bishop of Bjørgvin, Erik Pontoppidan was recalled to Copenhagen and Tidemand was promoted to vice-bishop to lead the diocese while the bishop was absent. In 1757, he was appointed to be the Bishop of the Diocese of Bjørgvin. In 1760, Bishop Tidemand received his doctor of theology degree. After five years as the Bishop there, he took a new job as the Bishop of the Diocese of Christianssand. He held that post for sixteen years until his death in 1778.

Church of Norway titles
Preceded by Erik Pontoppidan	Bishop of Bjørgvin; 1757–1762	Succeeded by Frederik Arentz
Preceded by Jens Christian Spidberg	Bishop of Christianssand; 1762–1778	Succeeded by Eiler Eilersen Hagerup
