= Karleby, Falster =

Village on the island Falster, Denmark

Coordinates: 54°47′27″N 12°1′40″E

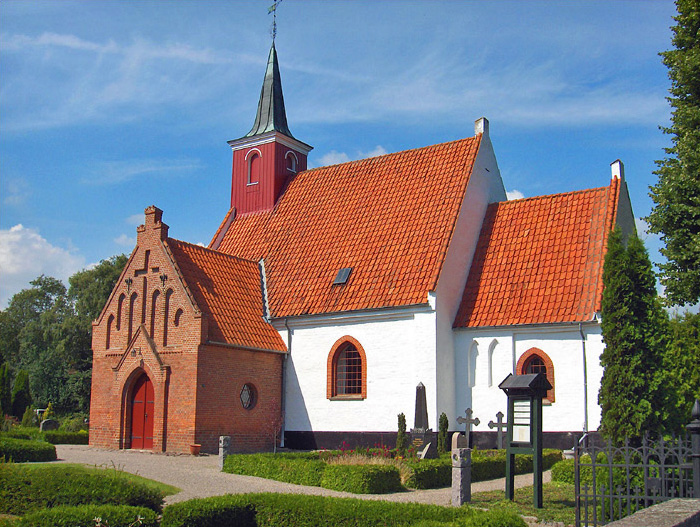
Village church

Karleby is a village in Guldborgsund Municipality in the Danish island Falster. Presently It has less than 200 inhabitants.
