= Tine Lindhardt =

Danish theologian

The Right Reverend Tine Lindhardt
- Bishop of Funen
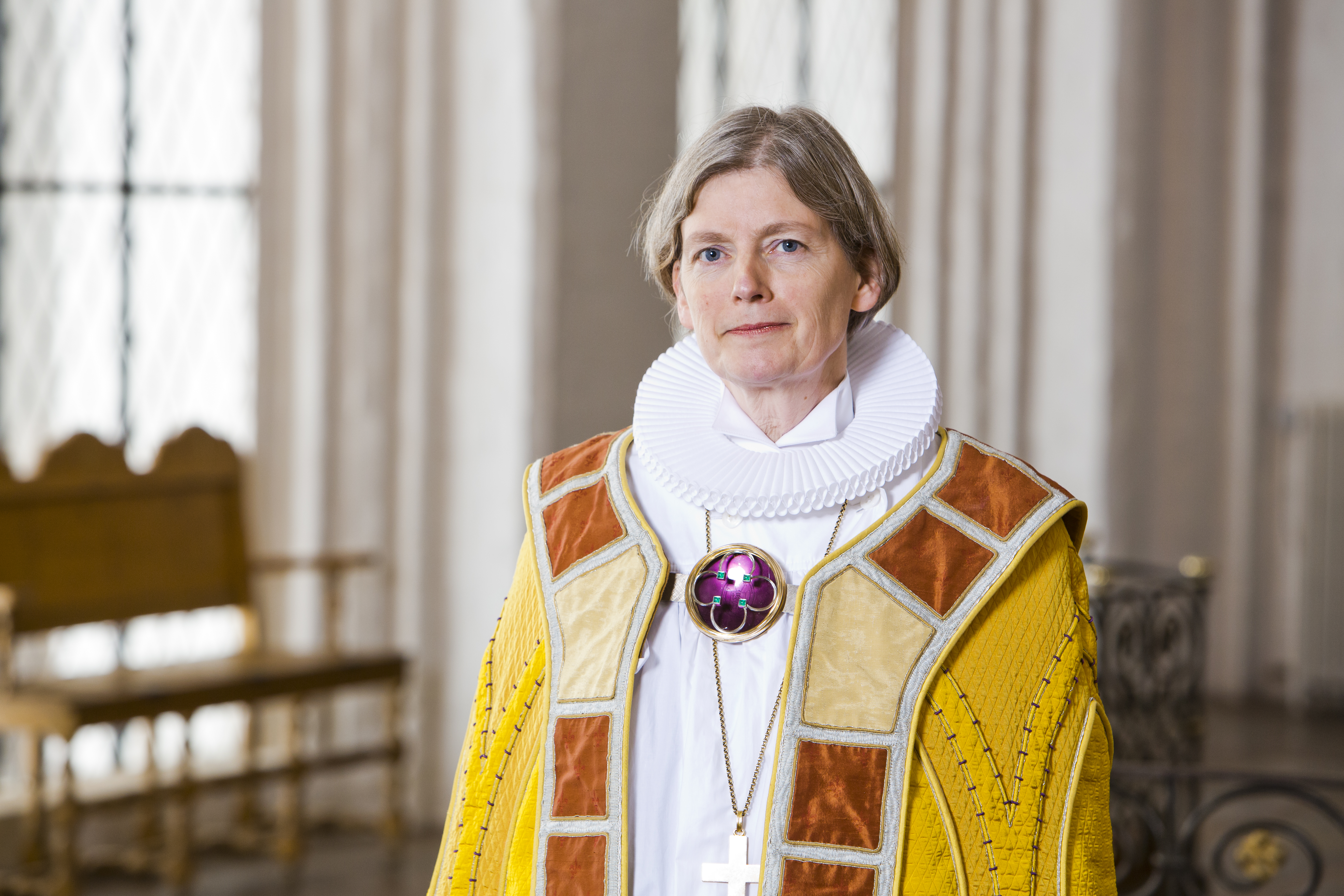
- Church: Church of Denmark
- Diocese: Funen
- Elected: 9 October 2012
- Predecessor: Kresten Drejergaard

Orders
- Ordination: 1984
- Consecration: 4 November 2012

Personal details
- Born: November 16, 1957 (age 68) Nørresundby, Denmark
- Denomination: Lutheran
- Spouse: Jan Lindhardt
- Children: 2
- Education: Aarhus University

Tine Lindhardt (born 16 November 1957), a Danish theologian, is the Lutheran bishop of the Diocese of Funen from 4 November 2012.

Lindhardt studied theology at Aarhus University, graduating in 1984. She has worked as a parish priest and has also taught at as an external lecturer at Aarhus University. She was secretary general of the Danish Bible Society (Det Danske Bibelskab) from 2003 to 2010 where she was responsible for coordinating a new translation of the Bible into Danish.

Lindhardt was married to Jan Lindhardt, the bishop of Roskilde until his retirement in April 2008. He died in November 2014.
