= Jacob Kærup =

Right Reverend Jacob Kærup
- Bishop
- Church: Church of Denmark; Church of Norway
- Diocese: Diocese of Christianssand

Personal details
- Born: 13 September 1682 Nakskov, Lolland, Denmark
- Died: 29 August 1751 (aged 68) Christianssand, Norway
- Denomination: Christian
- Occupation: Priest
- Education: University of Copenhagen

Jacob Kærup (13 September 1682–29 August 1751) was a Danish theologian and priest. He served as a bishop of the Diocese of Christianssand from 1733 until his death in 1751. He was one of the most diligent and conscientious bishops in the era of state-run pietism during the 1700s in Denmark-Norway under King Christian VI.

== Personal life ==
Jacob Kærup was born on 13 September 1682 in the village of Nakskov on the island of Lolland in southern Denmark. He was born to the merchant and local leader Peder Kærup and his wife Margrete Jacobsdatter, who was the daughter of a priest. He was married in Copenhagen in 1712 to Helene Cathrine Brinch, the widow of the Danish priest Hans Hansen Hagerup (1682–1711). He died on 29 August 1751 in Christianssand in Norway.

== Education and career ==
Jacob Kærup was educated at the Latin school at the Church of Our Lady in Copenhagen. He graduated from the University of Copenhagen in 1701. In 1703, he received his Baccalaureate degree and continued his studies at Borchs Kollegium in Copenhagen. After some time as a teacher, he defended his theological thesis and in 1707 became a student under the Bishop of Copenhagen, Henrik Bornemann. He took his theological exam in 1711 in Copenhagen and in 1712, he got his Master of Philosophy degree.

After all of his studying, he was hired in 1711 to work as the resident chaplain at the Church of Holmen in Copenhagen. After seventeen years there, he was promoted to head parish priest and dean there in 1728. On 27 April 1733, he was appointed by the King of Denmark-Norway to be the Bishop of the Diocese of Christianssand in southern Norway. The year after he became bishop, there was a major fire, burning two-thirds of the city of Christianssand including the church and school. This led to much poverty and lack of resources for his people. His time as bishop was during a time of state pietism whereby the King endorsed legislation that sought to make all of his subjects behave like good Christians and Bishop Kærup did what he could to carry out those laws. In particular, he sought to put in place a good educational system in his diocese to allow the people of the diocese to become more educated, especially after the 1736 law which made Confirmation mandatory. He served as bishop until his death in 1751 at the age of 69. He was described by Mich. Tyrholm as a good bishop having "the zeal of faith, thorough teaching, godly living, right-mindedness, a humble walk, and unremitting haste."

Church of Norway titles
Preceded by Christopher Nyrop	Bishop of Christianssand; 1733–1751	Succeeded by Rasmus Paludan
