= Vest-Agder Museum Kristiansand =

Coordinates: 58°09′42.79″N 8°01′49.72″E

Kristiansand Museum
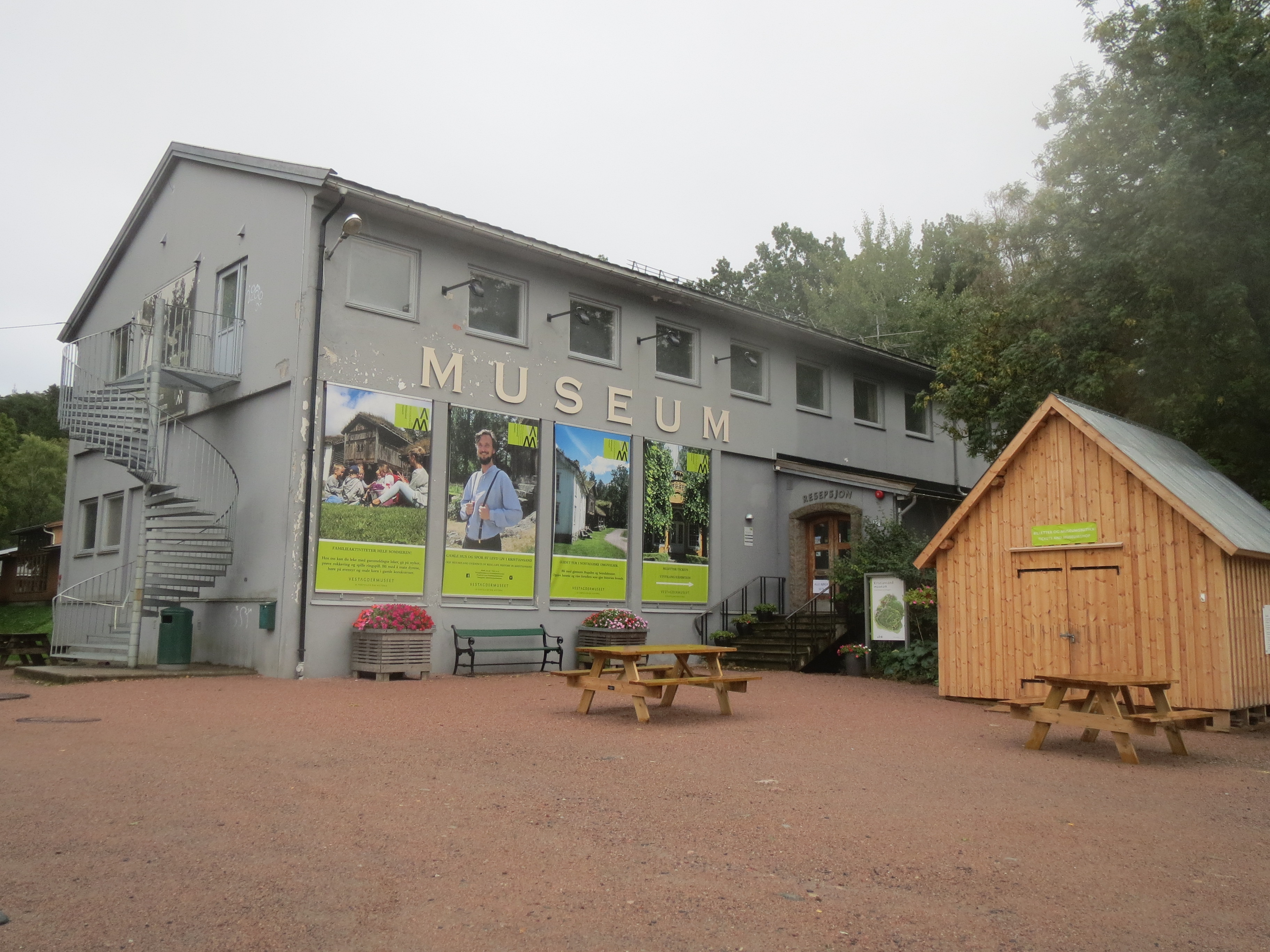
- Kristiansand Museum main exhibition building
- Established: 1903
- Location: Kristiansand, Norway
- Type: Regional museum
- Collection size: Main building, 40 townhouses and farmhouses from Agder
- Website: vestagdermuseet.no/kristiansand

Vest-Agder Museum Kristiansand or simply Kristiansand Museum (formerly Vest-Agder Fylkesmuseum) was founded in 1903 and is located in Kristiansand, Norway. Kristiansand Museum consists of a main building with collections and 40 old buildings, grouped by where they previously stood.

== Exhibits ==
- Setesdaltunet consists of buildings from Valle Municipality and Bykle Municipality in Setesdal to the north of Kristiansand. It contains houses for living, stabbur, sauna and barns. The oldest buildings date from the middle of the 17th century. The farm shows how the housing and living conditions developed in Setesdal until 1920.
- Vest-Agdertunet consists of farmhouse, storehouse, barn/stable, barn and schoolhouse from Eiken in northern Hægebostad Municipality, originally built in the period 1859-1875.
- Bygaden (the town street) consists of houses, taken from town centre Kvadraturen in Kristiansand. The collection includes general store, workshops and houses for living with interiors, time typical for the late 19th century.
- Mini city is a miniature model of Kvadraturen, the city centre of Kristiansand, as the city appeared in the 1880s and 1890s. There is also a model of the former Kristiansand Cathedral which burned to the ground in 1880. "Mini-builders" is a group of enthusiasts who have built the model as a hobby.
- Refugees cabin: Near the main building is a cabin that was used by resistance fighters on the run from Gestapo during World War II.

== Vest-Agder-museet IKS ==
Kristiansand Museum forms part of Vest-Agder-museet IKS which was established as a result of a consolidation in 2006-07. Vest-Agder-museet IKS currently consists of several geographical departments: Flekkefjord museum, Lista museum, Sjølingstad Uldvarefabrik, Mandal museum, Kristiansand museum (formerly Vest-Agder Fylkesmuseum), Gimle Gård, Setesdalsbanen, Kristians kanonmuseum and SS Hestmanden. Vest-Agder-museet IKS is organized as an inter-municipal company, owned by the municipalities and the county.

== Gallery ==
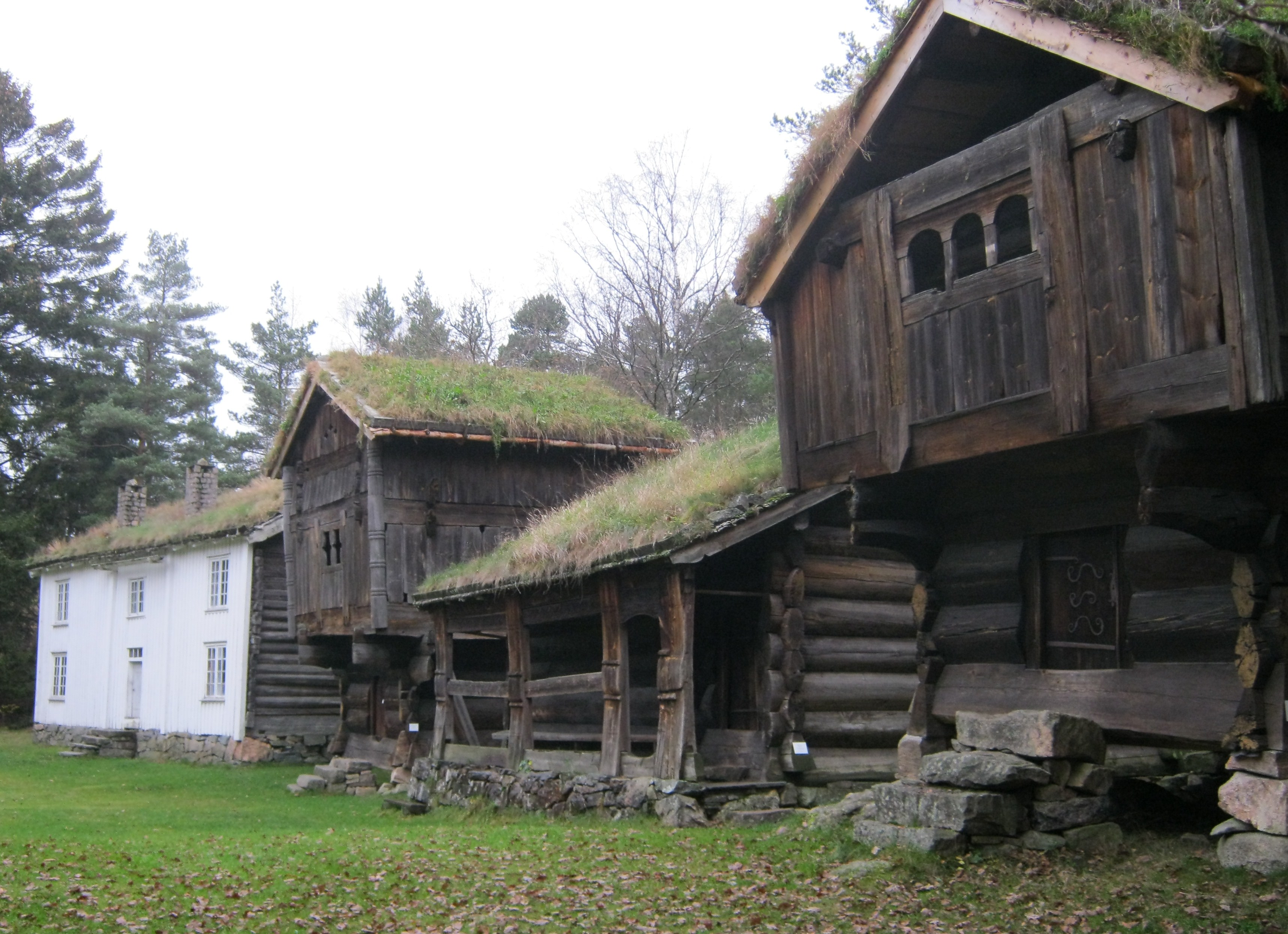
Setesdalstunet

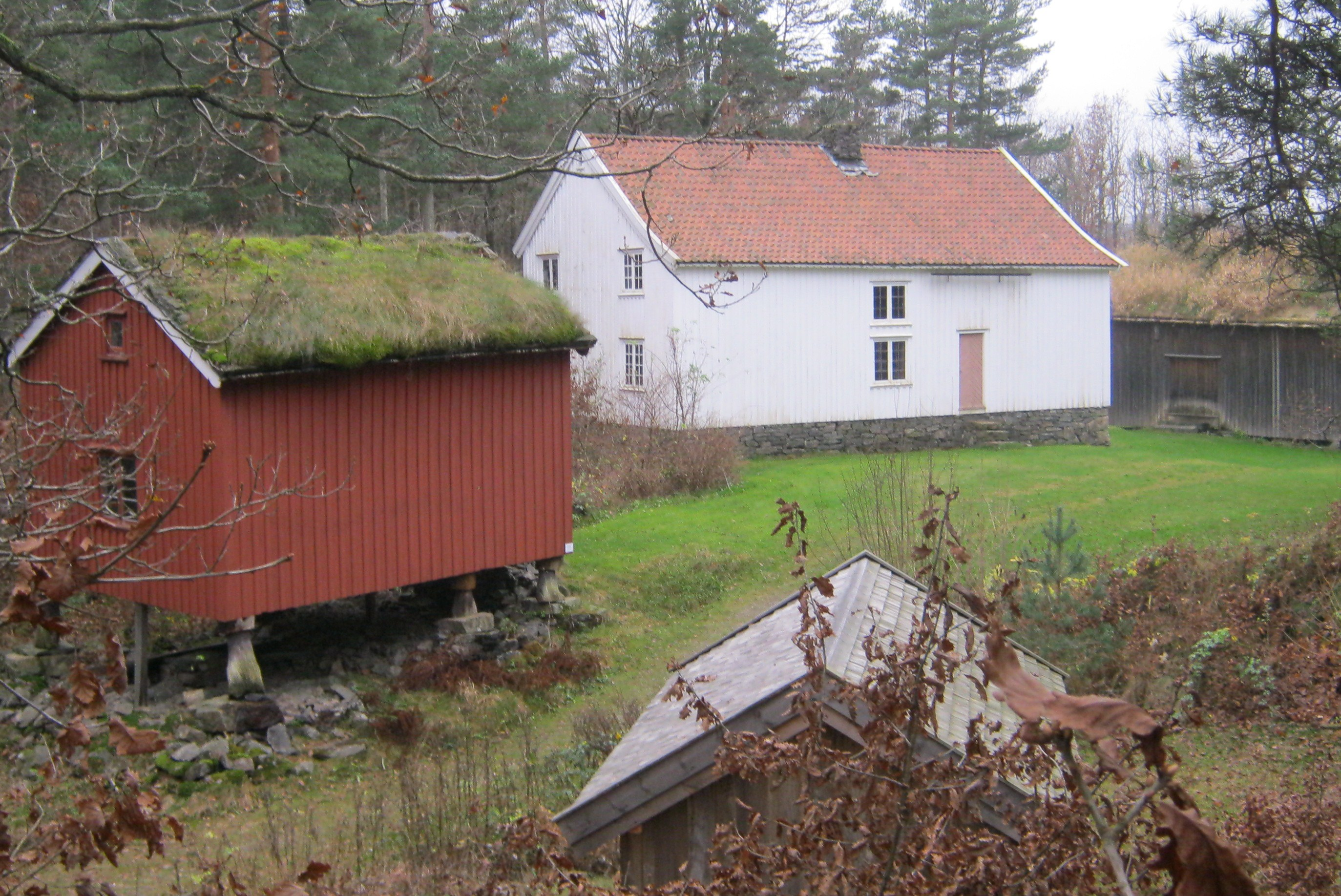
Vest-Agdertunet

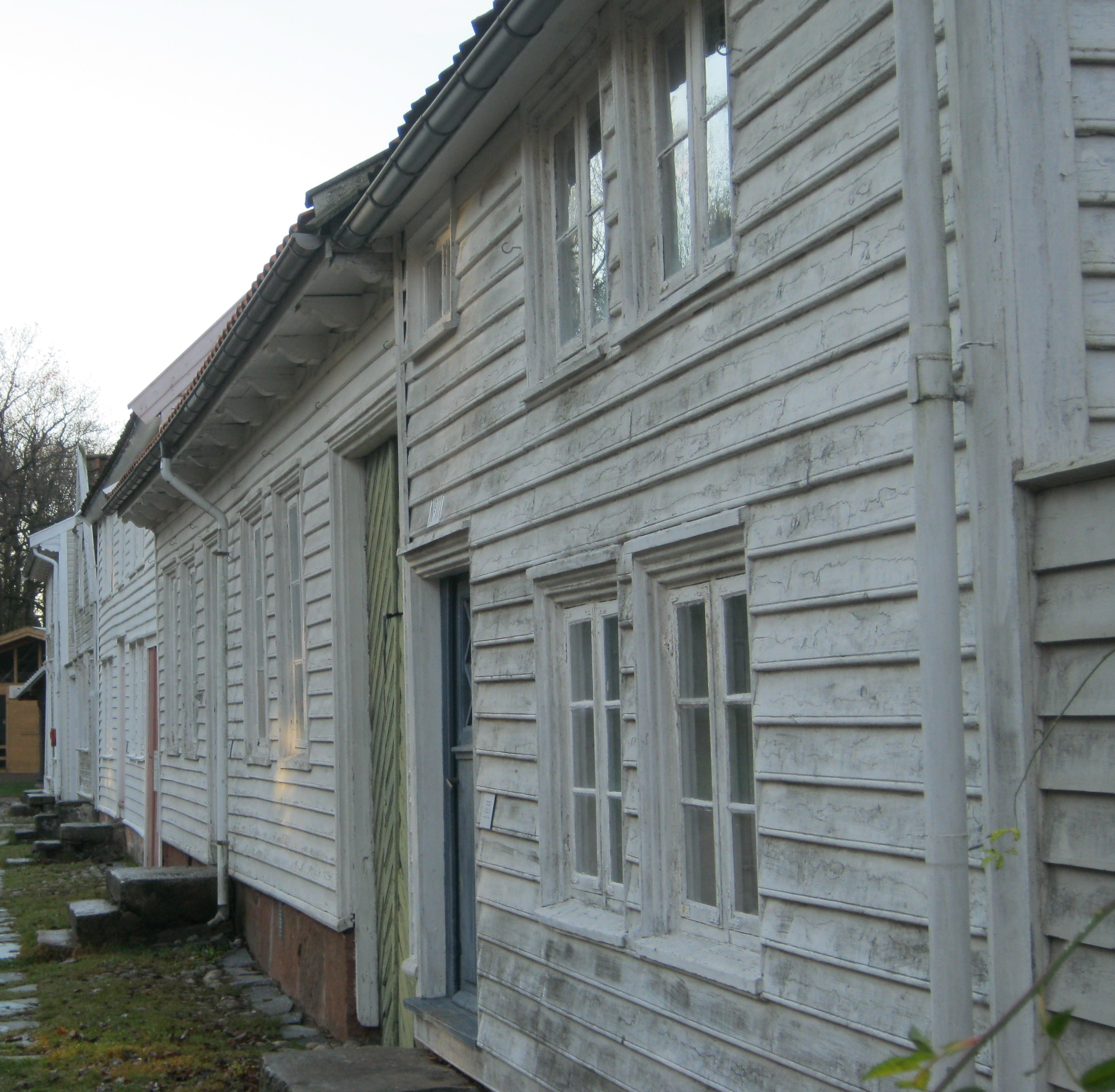
Bygaden

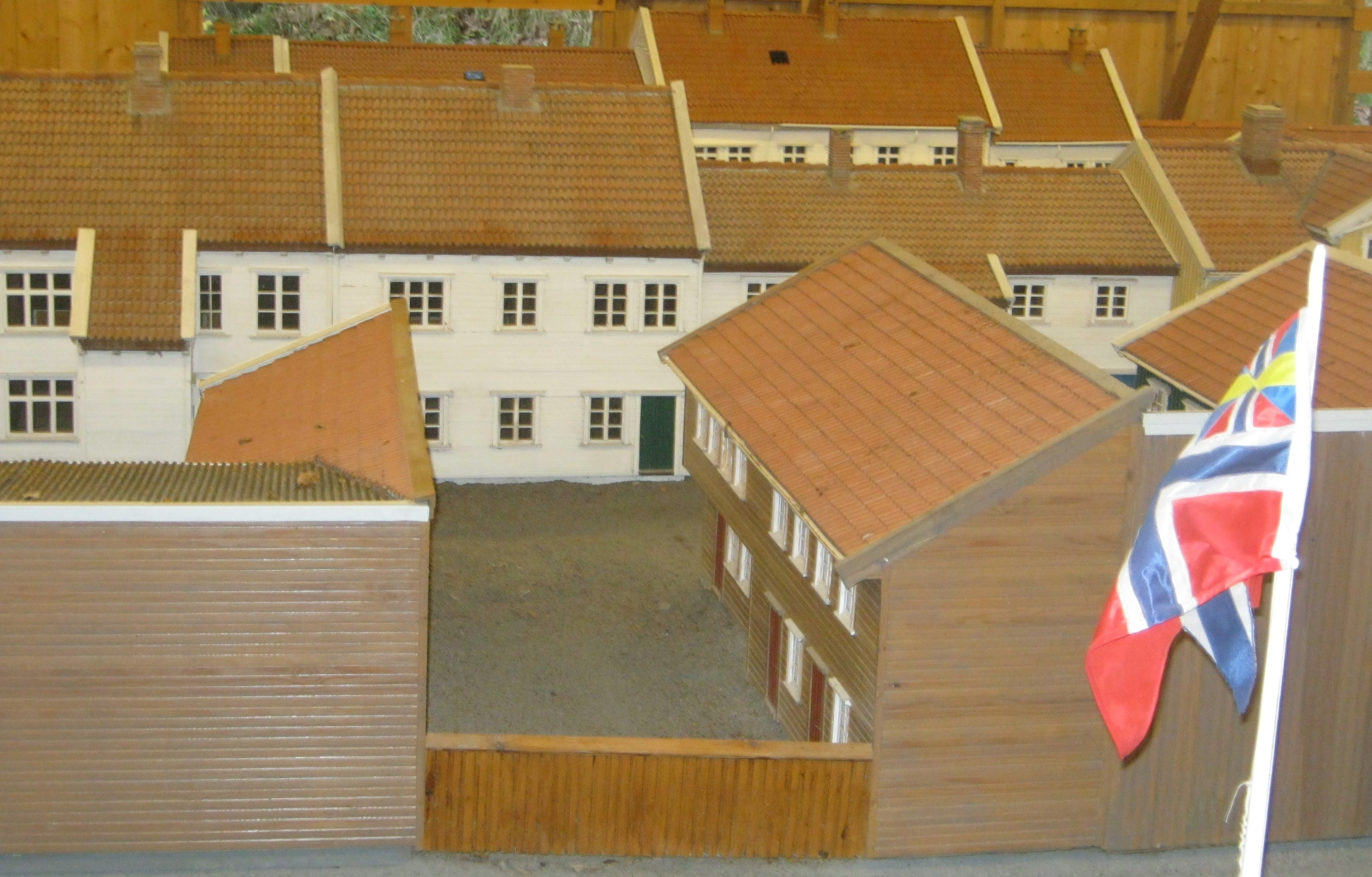
Mini city

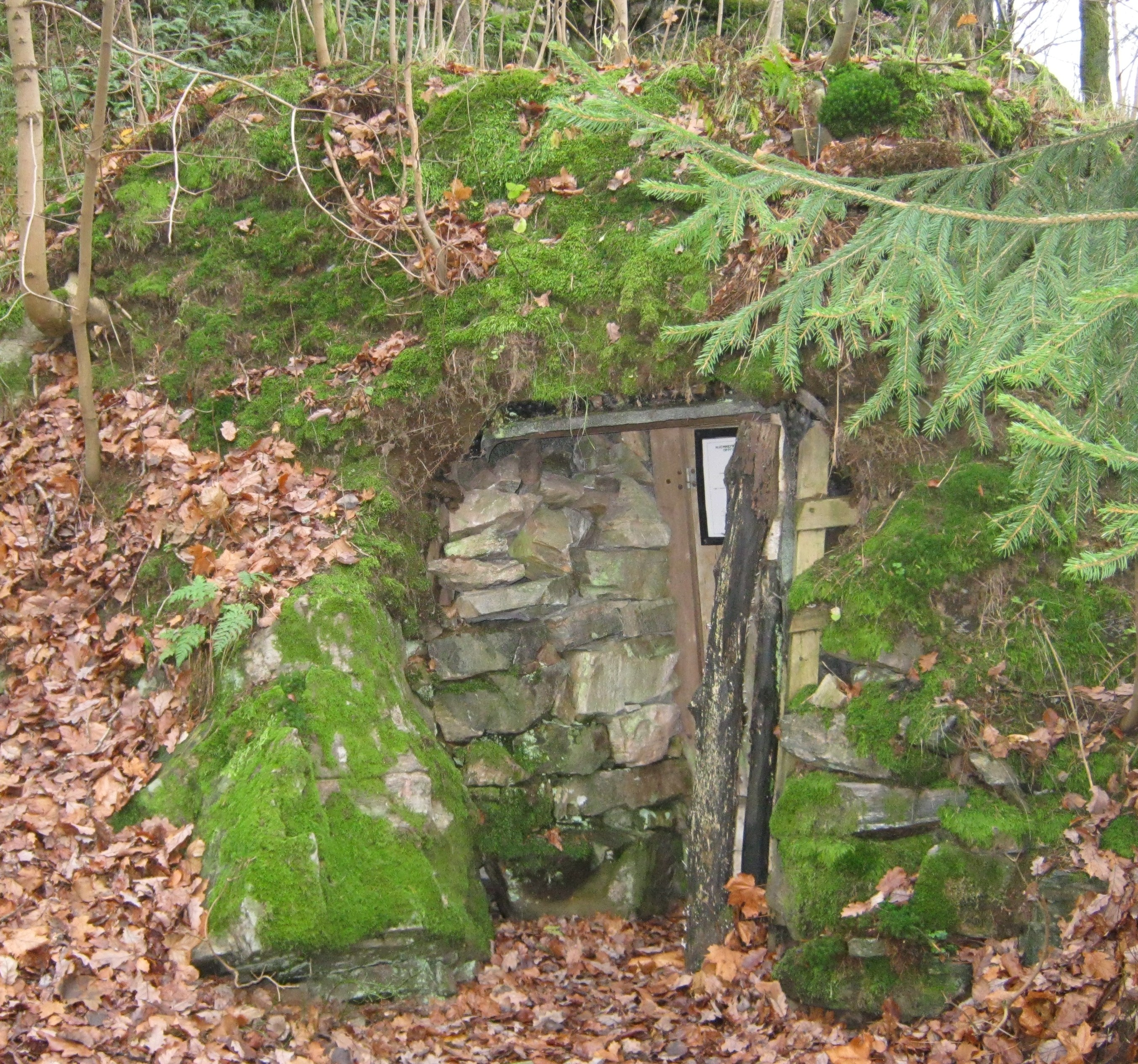
Refugees cabin
