= Jan Lindhardt =

Danish theologian and writer

Jan Lindhardt (24 April 1938, in Copenhagen – 11 November 2014) was a Danish theologian and writer. He was the son of professor Dr Poul Georg Lindhardt and Gerda Winding, and the elder brother of the Rev Mogens Lindhardt. His nephew is actor Thure Lindhardt. He was married to Tine Lindhardt, Bishop of Funen from 2012 until his death. He graduated with a doctorate in theology from Copenhagen University in 1962, and served as Bishop of Roskilde Diocese from 1997–2008.

== Death ==
Jan Lindhardt died on 11 November 2014 from Alzheimer's disease.

== Opinions ==
Lindhardt often commented publicly on developments in the Lutheran Danish state church. Along with Jacob Holm, of the church Fredenskirken in Viby J, he held the opinion that Hell in the traditional concept does not exist, and that the Danish National Church's concept should instead regard a more universalist doctrine. This view was rejected by the fundamentalist Inner Mission organization.

== Bibliography ==
Lindhardt has published:

- Machiavelli, 1969
- The political, human, 1970
- Rhetoric, 1975 (new ed. 1987)
- Conscience as compared with LB Bojesen, 1979
- Rhetorician, Poeta Historicus. Studien über rhetorische Erkenntnis und im Lebensanschauung Italienische Renaissancehumanismus, Leiden, 1979
- Martin Luther. Cognition and communication in the Renaissance, 1983
- Martin Luther. Renaissance and Reformation, 1983
- From talking to thought: the main lines of European history of ideas, 1987
- Speech and writing. Two cultures, 1989
- Between the Devil and God. About Martin Luther, 1991
- Renaissance and modern times, 1992
- The vivid picture of the open space, 1993
- Down from the shelf. About ethics disappearance and possible reappearance, 1998
- Catechism of Christianity. children learning for adults, 2000
- The seven deadly sins, 2001
- Into the Outer, 2001
- A minor character in my life: memoirs prematurely, 2003
- From prayer world, 2004
- Church?: Church in the Danish society, 2005
