= Lyptus =

Type of wood (trademarked)

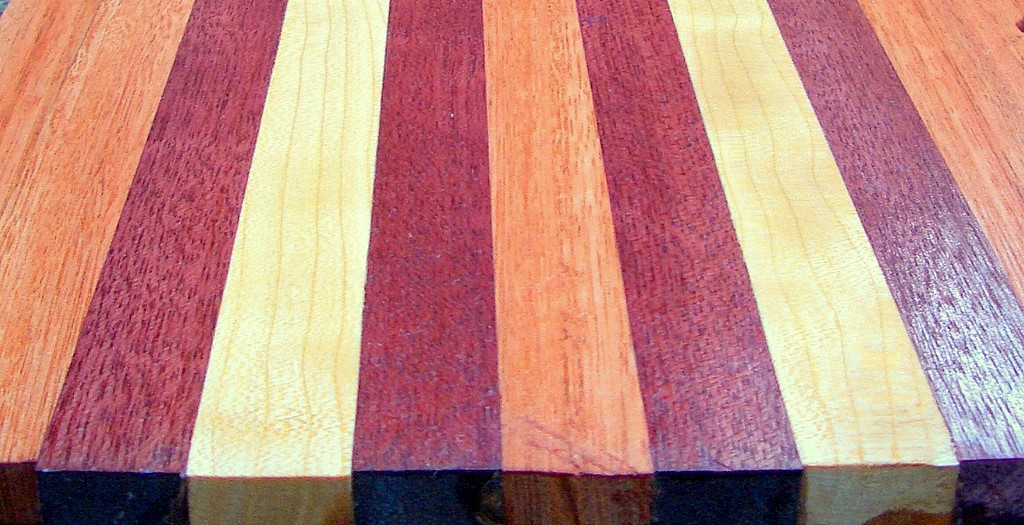
A board laminated with purpleheart (the darkest wood), cherry (the lightest wood), and Lyptus, the salmon colored wood.

Lyptus is the trade name of a wood made from a hybrid of two species of Eucalyptus tree, Eucalyptus grandis and Eucalyptus urophylla. Developed for quick harvesting, and grown on plantations in Brazil, Lyptus is marketed as an environmentally friendly alternative to oak, cherry, mahogany, and other wood products that may be harvested from old growth forests. Lyptus trees can be harvested for lumber in approximately 15 years, much sooner than woods from cooler climates.

Lyptus is grown in plantations operated by Fibria, a company resulting from the merger of Aracruz Celulose S.A. and Votorantim Celulose e Papel. Lyptus is distributed in North America by Weyerhaeuser. Fibria forests total 1.3 million hectares, of which 461,000 hectares are native reserves dedicated to environmental protection, in six Brazilian States: Espírito Santo, Bahia, Minas Gerais, Rio Grande do Sul, São Paulo and Mato Grosso do Sul.

== Properties ==
Lyptus has mechanical properties similar to many hardwoods, and is most often compared to maple. It is a closed-grain wood, and is harder than oak. The high hardness and closed grain structure make it popular for cabinetry, millwork and flooring. The coloration varies from a light salmon to a deeper red. With exposure to UV light, the pigments darken slightly.

== Workability ==
Lyptus is largely marketed as a viable alternative to mahogany. The density and closed, uniform grain structure of Lyptus lends well to both milling and machining. It does not produce the "fuzzy" raised grain when sawed that mahogany frequently does, and unlike maple, it does not have spots of knurled grain that would make it prone to tearout.

== Benefits ==
As a plantation grown wood, use of Lyptus does not deplete old growth forests, which are regarded as valuable havens for biodiversity. Lyptus's fast growth rate ensures that supply stays high, and keeps costs low. The plantation environment also allows for precise control of soil chemistry, tree spacing, and other factors affecting growth, resulting in the highest quantity of quality wood from the smallest space.

== Criticism ==
Aracruz has been criticized in the past for poor relations with indigenous peoples, by strongly supporting legal measures that would give Aracruz land previously designated for indigenous tribes. Aracruz has refused to certify their process with the Forest Stewardship Council and related forestry certification programs. Aracruz claims that they do not certify with current programs because they are too limiting, and do not represent realistic practices. However, others feel that their lack of certification is a sign that they are engaging in processes that may not be environmentally friendly. Fibria closed the Lyptus sawmill in October 2017.
