= Erling Lorentzen =

Norwegian businessman (1923–2021)

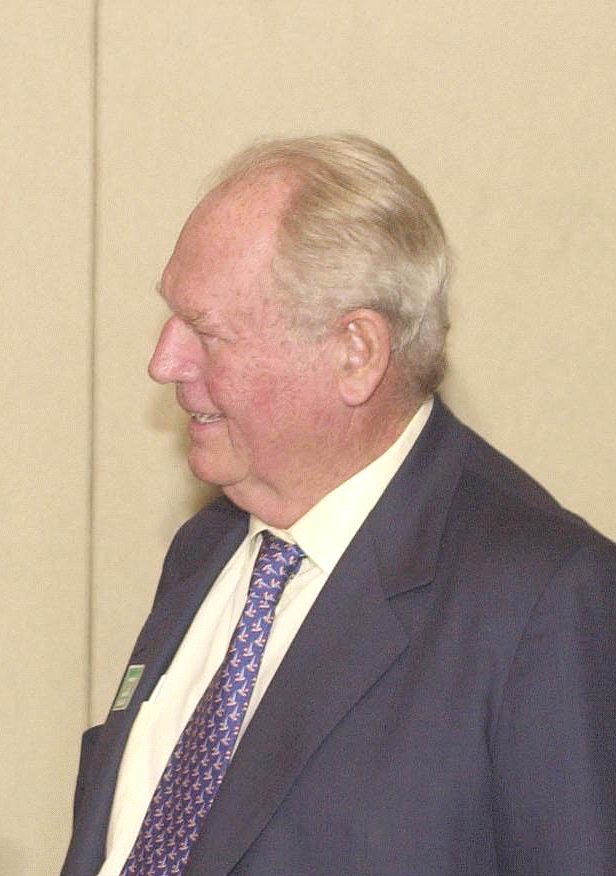
- Lorentzen in 2003
- Born: Erling Sven Lorentzen; 28 January 1923; Oslo, Norway
- Died: 9 March 2021 (aged 98); Oslo, Norway
- Burial place: Asker Church Cemetery, Oslo, Norway
- Other name: Erling S. Lorentzen
- Spouse: Princess Ragnhild of Norway (m. 1953; died 2012)
- Children: 3
- Parent(s): Øivind Lorentzen; Ragna Lorentzen

Erling Sven Lorentzen (28 January 1923 – 9 March 2021) was a Norwegian shipowner and industrialist. He founded Aracruz Celulose in 1968. He was the widower of Princess Ragnhild, the eldest child of King Olav V of Norway. In addition to being a Norwegian princess, his wife was in the line of succession to the British throne and occupied the 18th place at the time of her birth. Erling Lorentzen was a member of the Lorentzen family of shipping magnates.

== Life and career ==
Lorentzen was born in Oslo as the son of Øivind Lorentzen (1882–1980) and Ragna (née Nilsen; 1885–1976). He worked for the Norwegian Independent Company 1, a British military unit, during World War II.

He owned 28% of Aracruz Celulose, which he sold for approximately US$1.7 billion in July 2008.

His family was in the merchant marine business, and the Lorentzens had a line from the Gulf of Mexico to the east coast of Brazil and Argentina. In the early 1950s, Erling planned a visit to Brazil to meet with his representatives. At the time, they transported liquefied petroleum gas from the Gulf of Mexico to Brazil. On the way to Brazil, Erling learned that Esso wanted to sell its gas distribution company in Brazil. So instead of visiting their representatives, Erling sought to know more about such a company that was for sale, which would expand the LPG transportation business. When Lorentzen bought the company, Erling moved to Brazil permanently. The company grew considerably, but Lorentzen sold it in 1972. After the sale, he started other businesses, such as Aracruz Celulose.

== Marriage and children ==
Lorentzen married Princess Ragnhild (1930–2012), elder granddaughter of the then-reigning King Haakon VII, on 15 May 1953 in Asker, Norway. He was thus the brother-in-law of King Harald V, Queen Sonja and Princess Astrid.

The couple had three children:

- Haakon Lorentzen (born 23 August 1954), married Martha Carvalho de Freitas (born 1958) on 14 April 1982, and has three children.
- Ingeborg Lorentzen (born 27 February 1957), married Paulo César Ribeiro Filho (born 1956) on 4 June 1982, and has one daughter.
- Ragnhild Alexandra Lorentzen (born 8 May 1968), married Aaron Matthew Long on 21 November 2003, and has two daughters.

== Honours ==
- Brazil: Knight Grand Cross of the Order of the Southern Cross
- Norway: Knight Commander of the Order of St. Olav
- Norway: Recipient of the St. Olav's Military Medal
- Norway: Recipient of the Norwegian War Medal
- Norway: Recipient of the 1940–1945 Defence Medal
- Norway: Recipient of the 70th Birthday Medal of King Haakon VII
- Norway: Recipient of the King Haakon VII Commemorative Medal
- Norway: Recipient of the Medal of the 100th Anniversary of the Birth of King Haakon VII
- Norway: Recipient of the King Olav V Silver Jubilee Medal
- Norway: Recipient of the King Olav V Commemorative Medal
- Norway: Recipient of the Medal of the 100th Anniversary of the Birth of King Olav V
- Norway: Recipient of the Royal House Centenary Medal
- Norway: Recipient of the King Harald V Silver Jubilee Medal
