= Haakon VII =

King of Norway from 1905 to 1957

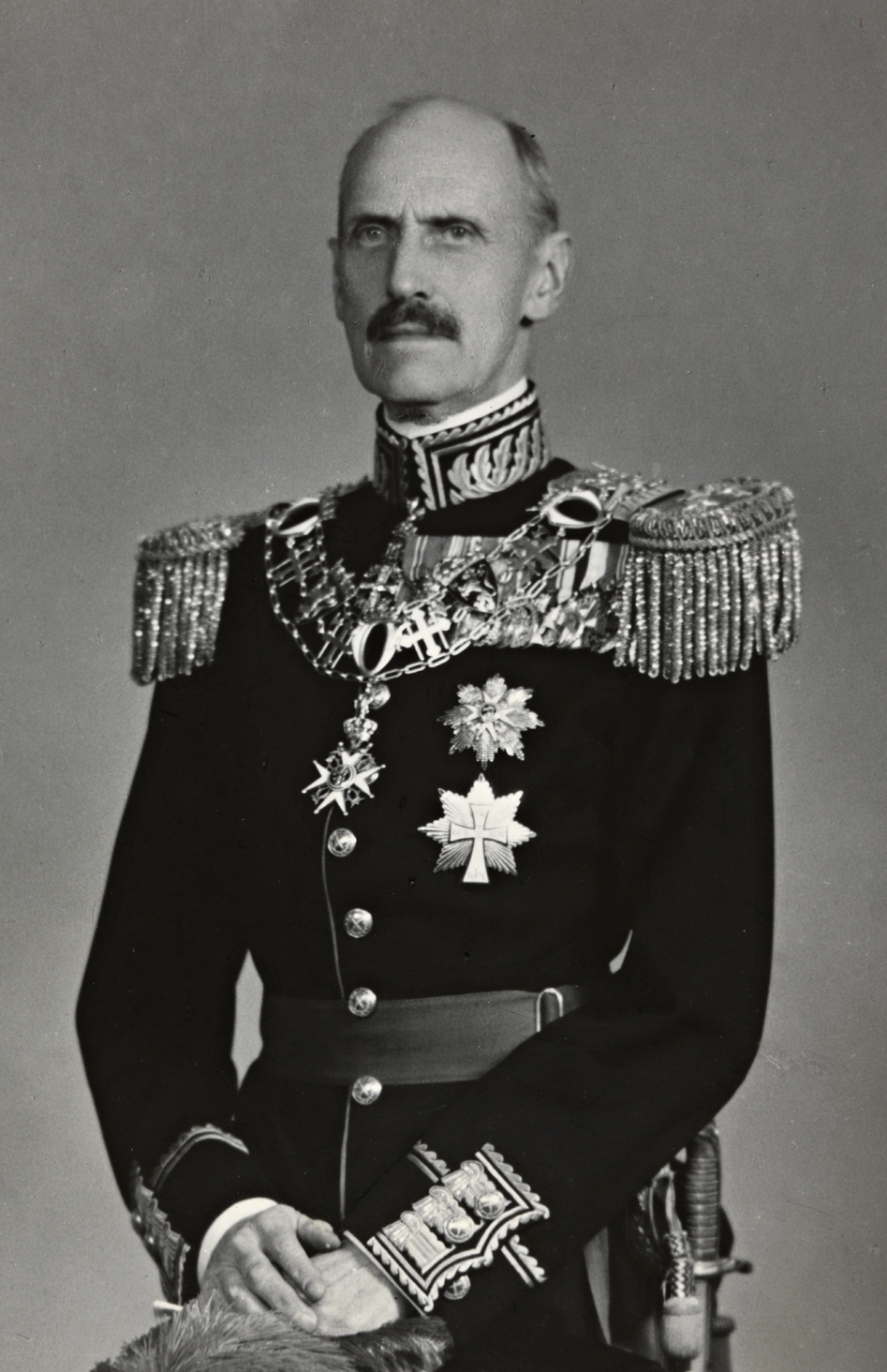
- Official portrait, 1946

King of Norway
- Reign: 18 November 1905 − 21 September 1957
- Coronation: 22 June 1906; Nidaros Cathedral
- Predecessor: Oscar II
- Successor: Olav V
- Regent: Olav (1955–1957)
- Born: Prince Christian Frederik Carl Georg Valdemar Axel of Denmark; 3 August 1872; Charlottenlund Palace, Copenhagen, Denmark
- Died: 21 September 1957 (aged 85); Royal Palace, Oslo, Norway
- Burial: 1 October 1957; Royal Mausoleum, Akershus Castle, Oslo
- Spouse: Maud of Wales (m. 1896; died 1938)
- Issue: Olav V
- House: Glücksburg
- Father: Frederick VIII of Denmark
- Mother: Louise of Sweden

Haakon VII (Norwegian: [ˈhôːkʊn]; born Prince Carl of Denmark; 3 August 1872 – 21 September 1957) was King of Norway from 1905 until his death in 1957.

Born in Copenhagen during the reign of his grandfather, King Christian IX of Denmark, he was named Carl at birth and was the second son of the Crown Prince and Crown Princess of Denmark (later King Frederick VIII and Queen Louise). Through his mother, Louise of Sweden, he was also a grandson of King Charles XV of Sweden, linking him lineally to both the Danish and Swedish royal houses.

Carl was educated at the Royal Danish Naval Academy and served in the Royal Danish Navy. After the 1905 dissolution of the union between Sweden and Norway, he was offered the Norwegian crown. Following a referendum on the monarchy, he accepted the offer and was formally elected King of Norway by the Storting and took the Old Norse name Haakon, thus ascended the throne as Haakon VII, the first independent Norwegian monarch since Olav IV in 1387.

As king, Haakon gained much sympathy from the Norwegian people. Although the Constitution of Norway vests the King with considerable executive powers, in practice, Haakon confined himself to a representative and ceremonial role while rarely interfering in politics, a practice continued by his successors. Norway was invaded by Nazi Germany in April 1940. Haakon rejected German demands to legitimise the Quisling regime's puppet government, vowing to abdicate rather than do so. He refused to abdicate after going into exile in Great Britain. As such, he played a pivotal role in uniting the Norwegian nation in its resistance to the invasion and the subsequent five-year-long occupation during the Second World War. He returned to Norway in June 1945 after the defeat of Germany.

Haakon became King of Norway when his grandfather Christian IX was still reigning in Denmark, and before his father and elder brother became kings of Denmark. During his reign he saw his father Frederick VIII, his elder brother Christian X, and his nephew Frederik IX ascend the throne of Denmark in 1906, 1912, and 1947 respectively. Haakon died at the age of 85 in September 1957. He was succeeded by his only child, a son, who ascended to the throne as Olav V.

== Early life ==
=== Birth and family ===
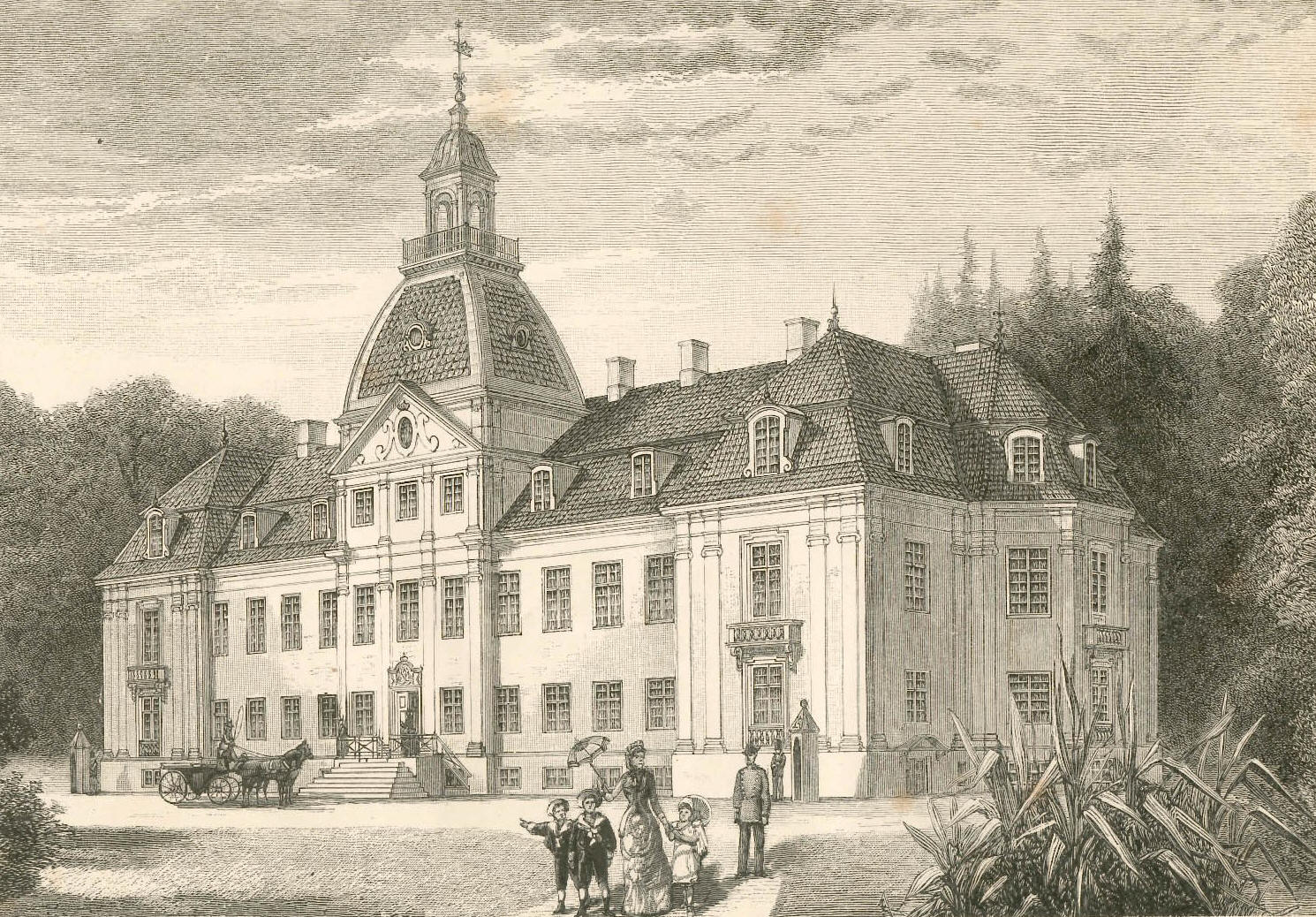
Prince Carl's birthplace, Charlottenlund Palace north of Copenhagen, c. 1895.

Prince Carl was born on 3 August 1872 at his parents' country residence, Charlottenlund Palace north of Copenhagen, during the reign of his paternal grandfather, King Christian IX. He was the second son of Crown Prince Frederik of Denmark (the future King Frederick VIII) and his wife Louise of Sweden. His father was the eldest son of King Christian IX and Louise of Hesse-Kassel, and his mother was the only daughter of King Charles XV of Sweden (who was also king of Norway as Charles IV), and Louise of the Netherlands. At birth, he was third in the succession to the Danish throne after his father and older brother, but without any real prospect of inheriting the throne. The young prince was baptised at Charlottenlund Palace on 7 September 1872 by the Bishop of Zealand, Hans Lassen Martensen. He was baptised with the names Christian Frederik Carl Georg Valdemar Axel, and was known as Prince Carl (namesake of his maternal grandfather the King of Sweden-Norway, who died only 11 days after his baptism).

Carl belonged to the Schleswig-Holstein-Sonderburg-Glücksburg (often shortened to Glücksburg) branch of the House of Oldenburg. The House of Oldenburg had been the Danish royal family since 1448; between 1536 and 1814 it also ruled Norway, which was then part of the Kingdom of Denmark–Norway. The house was originally from northern Germany, where the Glücksburg (Lyksborg) branch held their small fief. The family had links with Norway beginning from the 15th century. Several of his paternal ancestors had been kings of Norway in union with Denmark and at times Sweden. They included Christian I, Frederick I, Christian III, Frederick II, Christian IV, and Frederick III. Frederick III integrated Norway into the Oldenburg state with Denmark, Schleswig and Holstein. His subsequent paternal ancestors had been dukes in Schleswig-Holstein. Christian Frederick, who was King of Norway briefly in 1814 as the first king of the Norwegian constitution and struggle for independence, was his great-granduncle.

=== Childhood and education ===
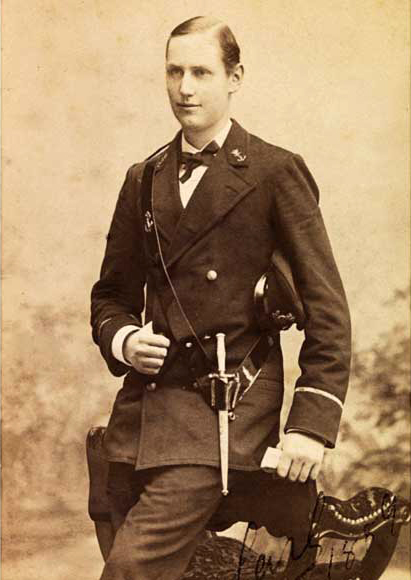
Prince Carl as a naval cadet in 1889.

Carl was raised with his siblings in the royal household in Copenhagen, and grew up between his parents' residence in Copenhagen, the Frederick VIII's Palace, an 18th-century palace which forms part of the Amalienborg Palace complex in central Copenhagen, and their country residence, Charlottenlund Palace, located by the coastline of the Øresund strait north of the city. In contrast to the usual practice of the period, where royal children were brought up by governesses, the children were raised by Crown Princess Louise herself. Under the supervision of their mother, the children received a rather strict Christian-dominated upbringing, which was characterized by severity, the fulfillment of duties, care and order.

As a younger son of the Crown Prince, there was little expectation that Carl would become king. He was third in line to the throne after his father and elder brother, Prince Christian, and spent his early life in the shadow of his elder brother. Carl was less than two years younger than Christian, and the two princes were educated together at home by private tutors and had a joint confirmation at Christiansborg Palace Chapel in 1887.

After his confirmation, as was customary for princes at that time, Carl was expected to start a military education. It was decided that he, in accordance with his own wishes, should enter the Royal Danish Navy. He was educated at the Royal Danish Naval Academy from 1889 to 1893, graduating as a second lieutenant. He subsequently remained in service with the Royal Danish Navy until his appointment as Norwegian king in 1905. In 1894 he was promoted to the rank of first lieutenant and in 1905 to the rank of admiral. During his naval career, he took part in several naval expeditions, including one in 1904–1905 with the protected cruiser HDMS Heimdal to the Mediterranean and the Atlantic.

=== Marriage ===
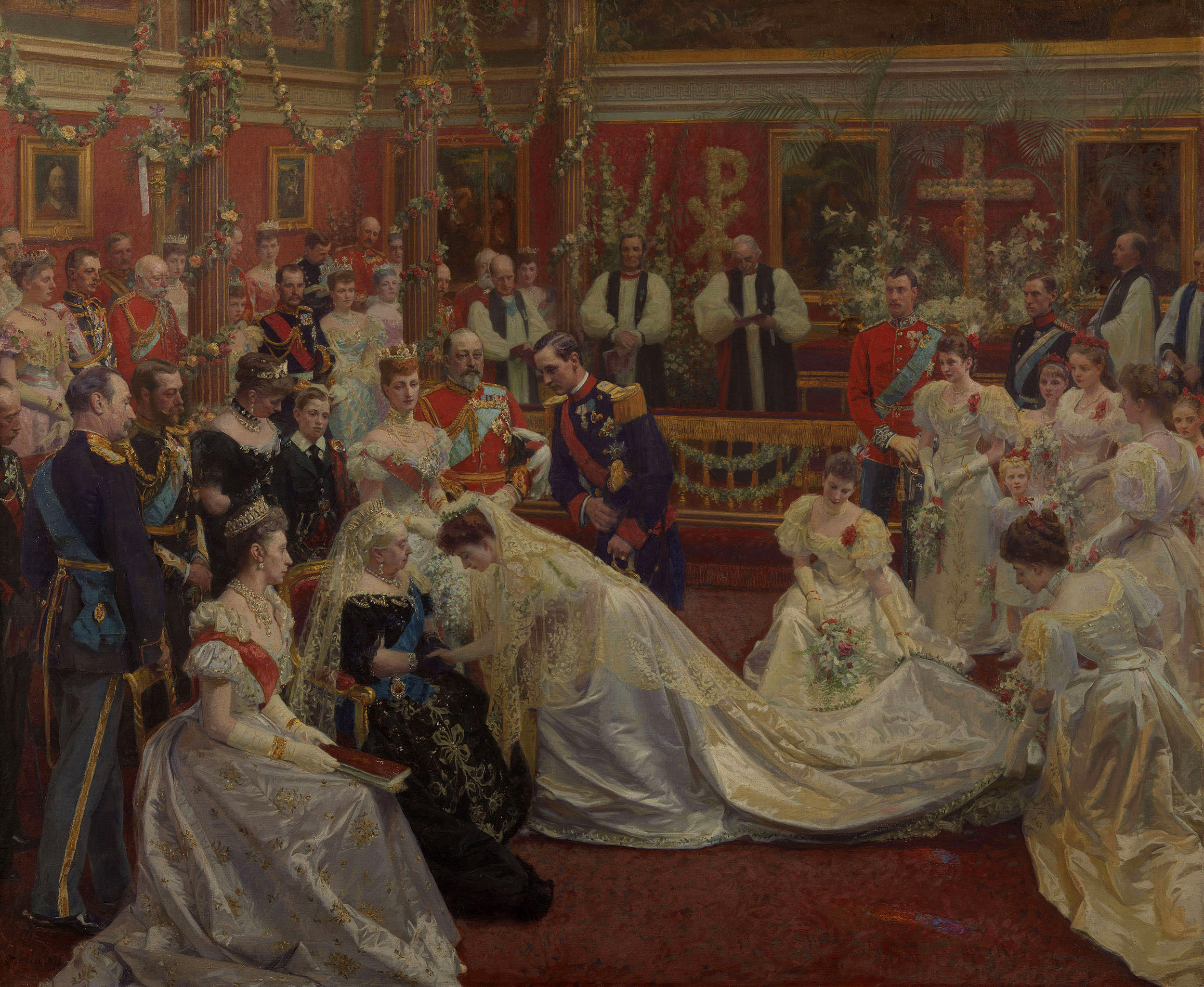
The Marriage of Princess Maud of Wales by Laurits Tuxen

On 28 October 1895, at the age of 23, Carl was engaged to his first cousin Princess Maud of Wales. Princess Maud was the youngest daughter of the Prince and Princess of Wales (later King Edward VII and Queen Alexandra of the United Kingdom). The Princess of Wales was Carl's aunt, being the eldest daughter of King Christian IX and Queen Louise. The wedding was celebrated on 22 July 1896, in the Private Chapel of Buckingham Palace, and was attended by the bride's grandmother, the 77-year-old Queen Victoria.

After the wedding, the couple settled in Copenhagen, where Carl continued his career as a naval officer. They took up residence in the Bernstorff Mansion, an 18th-century Rococo style townhouse owned by their mutual uncle King George I of Greece, situated in Bredgade immediately adjacent to the Amalienborg Palace complex. Furthermore, the bride's father gave them Appleton House on the Sandringham Estate as a country residence for his daughter's frequent visits to England. It was there that the couple's only child, Prince Alexander, the future Crown Prince Olav (and eventually King Olav V of Norway), was born on 2 July 1903.

== Accession to the Norwegian throne ==
=== Background and election ===
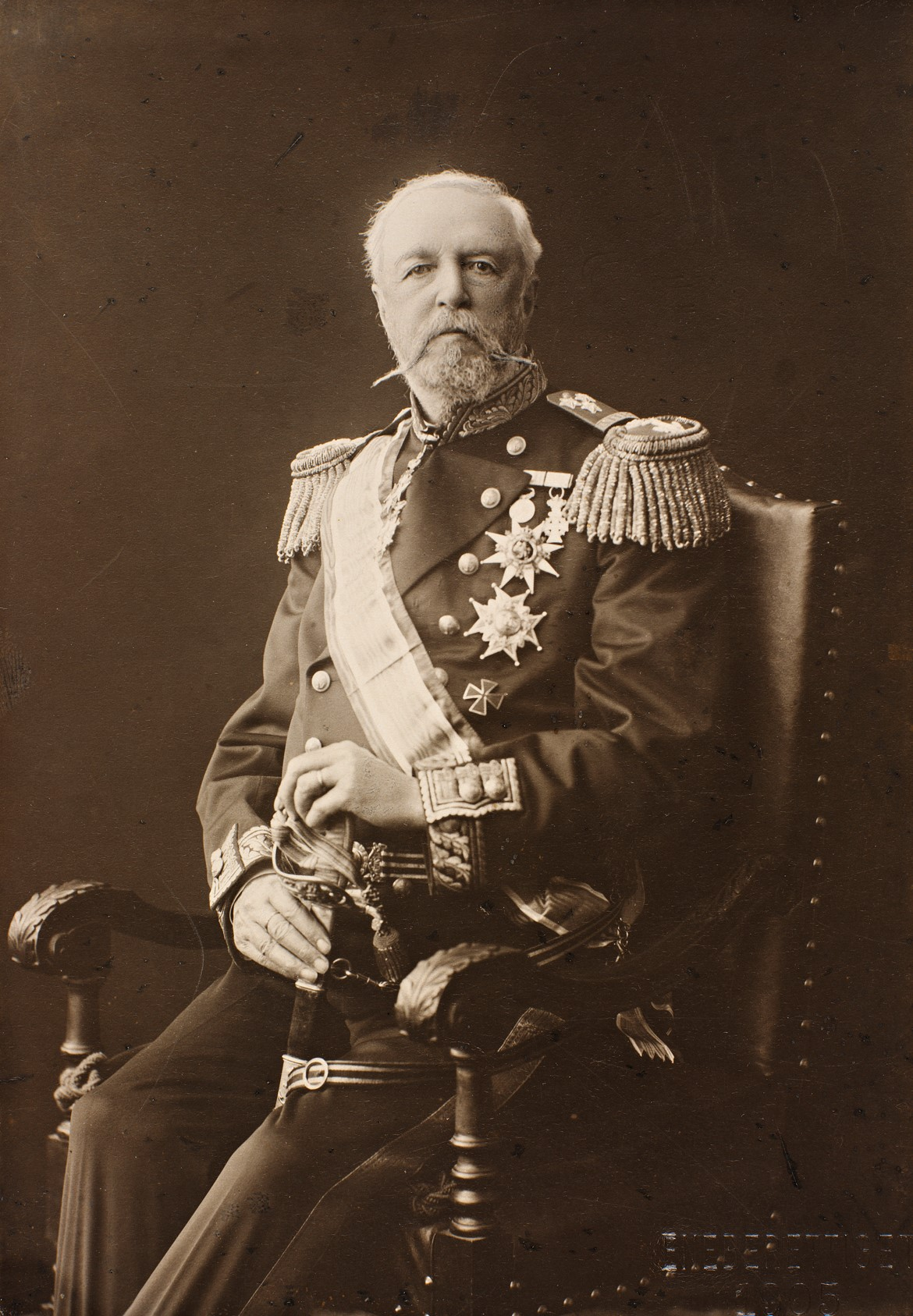
Prince Carl's maternal great-uncle, Oscar II of Sweden, who was King of Norway until October 1905.

Following several years of disagreements on various topics, the Union between Sweden and Norway which had existed since 1814 was dissolved in 1905. The union was unilaterally dissolved by the Storting (Norwegian parliament) on 7 June, and the dissolution was later confirmed by the Norwegian people in the 1905 Norwegian union dissolution referendum held on 13 August. After weeks of negotiations, the dissolution of the union was then recognized by Sweden on 23 September in the Treaty of Karlstad, mediated by the great powers of Europe. Its provisions included the full recognition of Norway's sovereignty and the abdication of the Swedish King Oscar II from the Norwegian throne. One month later, the union was formally dissolved as King Oscar II on 26 October signed the documents recognizing Norway as an independent state, and abdicated as Norwegian king on the same day.

Subsequently, a committee of the Norwegian government identified several princes of European royal houses as candidates for the vacant Norwegian crown. Although Norway legally had the status of an independent state since 1814, it had not had its own king since 1387. Gradually, Prince Carl became the leading candidate, largely because he was descended from independent Norwegian kings. He also had a son, providing an heir-apparent to the throne, and the fact that his wife, Princess Maud, was a member of the British royal family was viewed by many as an advantage to the newly independent Norwegian nation.

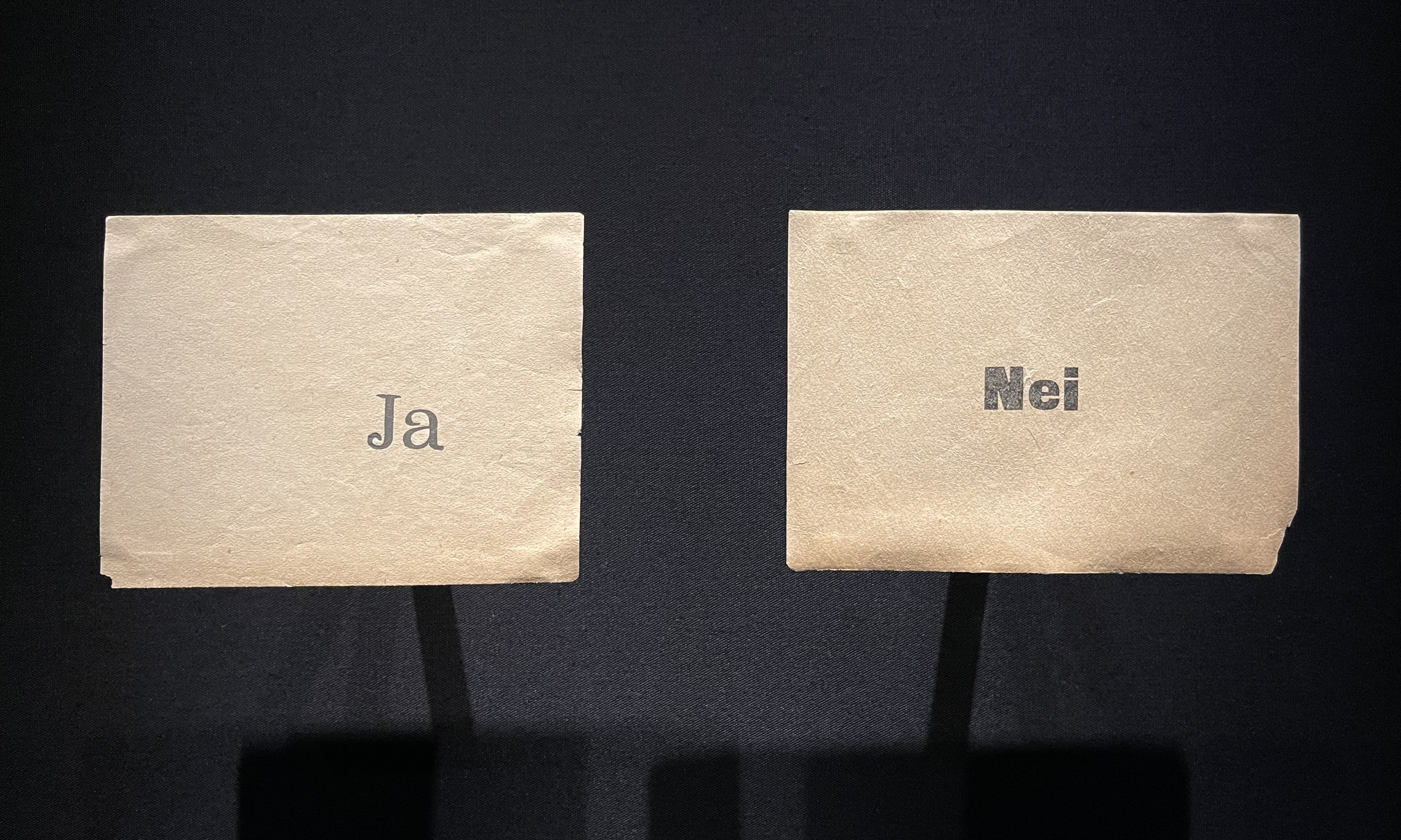
Ballots with yes and no from the 1905 Norwegian monarchy referendum.

The democratically minded Prince Carl, aware that Norway was still debating whether to remain a kingdom or to switch instead to a republican system of government, was flattered by the Norwegian government's overtures, but he made his acceptance of the offer conditional on the holding of a referendum to show whether monarchy was the choice of the Norwegian people. After the referendum overwhelmingly confirmed by a 79 percent majority (259,563 votes for and 69,264 against) that Norwegians desired to remain a monarchy, Prince Carl was formally offered the throne of Norway by the Storting (parliament) and was elected on 18 November 1905. When Carl accepted the offer that same evening (after the approval of his grandfather Christian IX of Denmark), he immediately endeared himself to his adopted country by taking the Old Norse name of Haakon, a name which had not been used by kings of Norway for over 500 years. In so doing, he succeeded his maternal great-uncle, Oscar II of Sweden, who had abdicated the Norwegian throne in October.

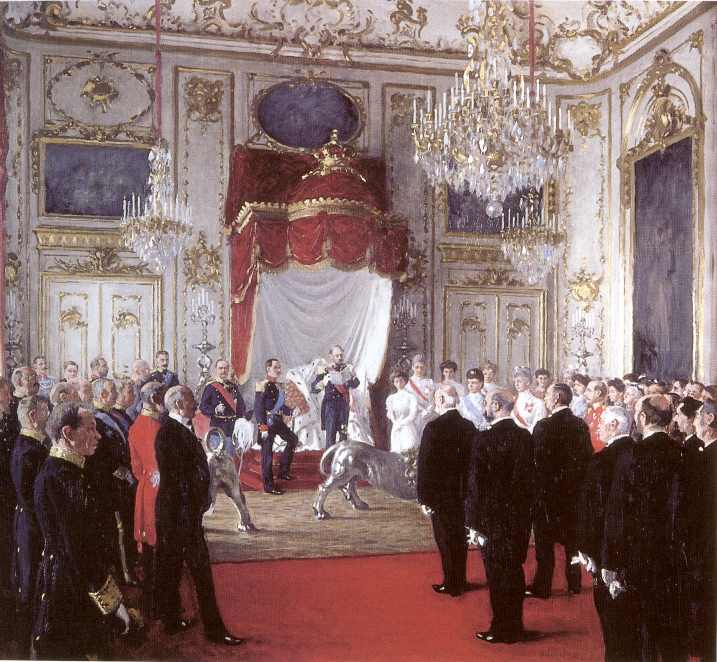
A delegation from the Norwegian Parliament is received on 20 November 1905 at Amalienborg by King Christian IX of Denmark, who gives his consent to the election of his grandson Prince Carl as King of Norway. Painting by Paul Fischer.

Two days later, on the morning of 20 November, a large crowd gathered outside King Haakon and Queen Maud's residence in Bernstorff's Palace in Copenhagen. The attendees greeted the royal couple as they appeared in the window and started singing the patriotic song Ja, vi elsker dette landet. Later the same day, King Christian IX of Denmark received a delegation from the Storting in an audience in Christian VII's Palace at Amalienborg. The delegation conveyed the message that the king's grandson had been elected King of Norway, while Christian IX expressed his consent to the election of Prince Carl. The head of the delegation, the President of the Storting Carl Berner, conveyed a greeting and congratulations from the Norwegian people, and expressed the people's wishes for a happy cooperation. The king replied:

Mr. President of the Storthing, gentlemen: The first greeting from the Representatives of the Norwegian People, who in their unanimous Storthing decision on 18 November has elected me their King, has touched me very deeply. The people have thereby shown me a confidence which I know how to appreciate, and which I hope will still grow stronger as it gets to know my wife and me. As it will be known to you, gentlemen, it was at my request that the newly concluded referendum took place. I wanted to be sure that it was a people and not a party that wanted me to be king, as my task above all should be to unite, not divide. My life I will devote to the good of Norway, and it is the fervent wish of my wife and I that the people who have chosen us will unite to cooperate and strive towards this great goal, and with full confidence I can then take as my motto: ALL FOR NORWAY!

=== Arrival in Norway ===
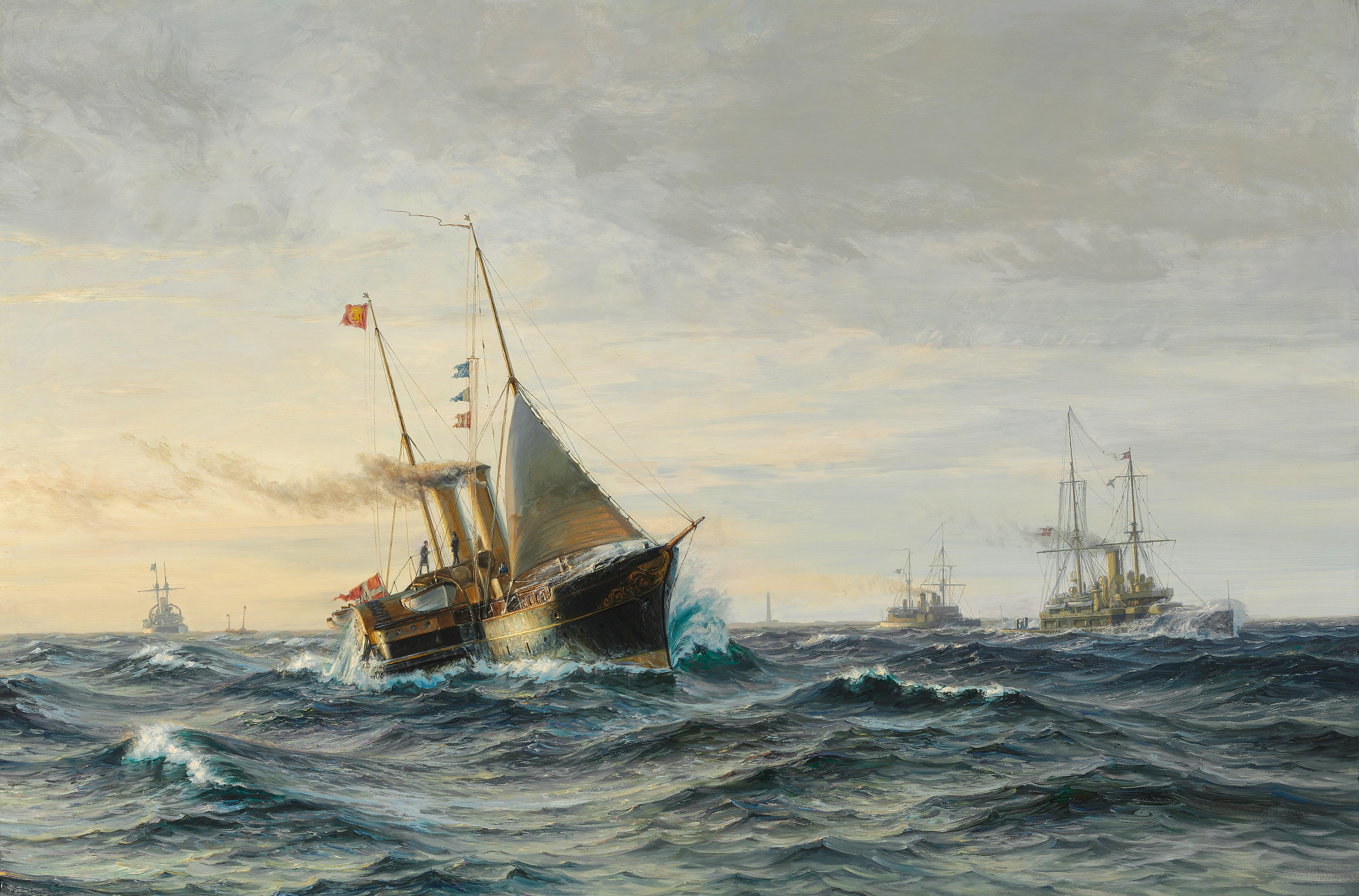
The royal yacht Dannebrog in the Skagerrak on its way from Copenhagen to Kristiania. Painting by Vilhelm Arnesen (1906).

Just three days later, on 23 November, the new Norwegian royal family left Copenhagen for Norway on board the Danish royal yacht, the paddle steamer Dannebrog. After crossing the Kattegat and the Skagerrak, the Dannebrog entered the Oslofjord, where at Oscarsborg Fortress near Drøbak, the family boarded the Norwegian naval ship Heimdal. The Heimdal then sailed the king the last part of the stretch from Drøbak, and after a two-day journey, the family arrived to Kristiania (now Oslo) early on the morning of 25 November 1905.

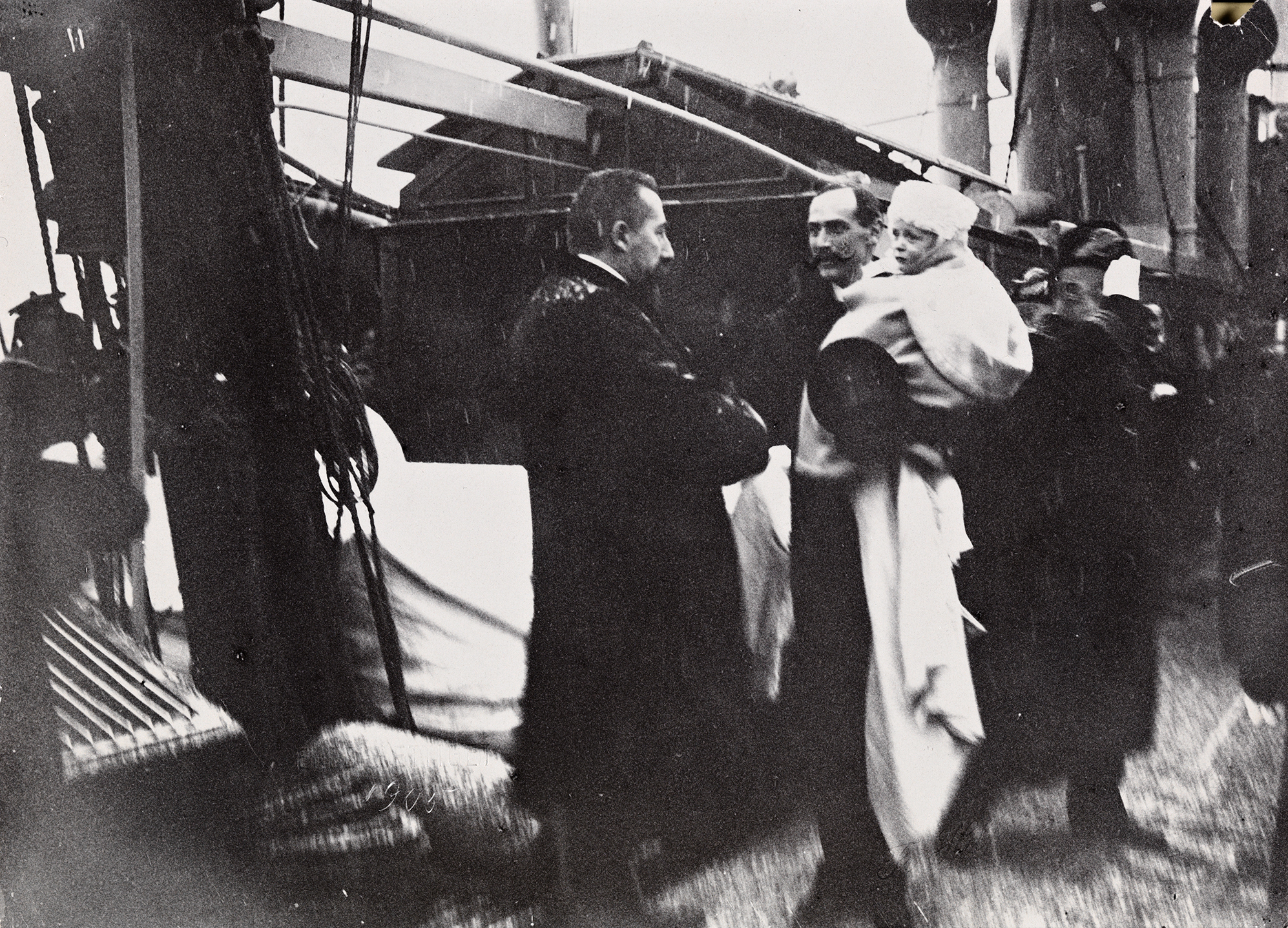
King Haakon VII arrives in Norway with Crown Prince Olav on his arm and is greeted on board the ship Heimdal by Prime Minister Christian Michelsen.

The king was received at the harbour by the Prime Minister of Norway Christian Michelsen. On the deck of the Heimdal, the Prime Minister gave the following speech to the king:

For almost 600 years, the Norwegian people have not had their own king. Never has he been completely our own. Always have we had to share him with others. Never has he had his home with us. But where the home is, there will also be the fatherland. Today it is different. Today, Norway's young king comes to build his future home in Norway's capital. Named by a free people as a free man to lead his country, he will be completely our own. Once again, the Norwegians' king will be the strong, unifying mark for all national deeds in the new, independent Norway ...

Two days later, on 27 November, Haakon VII took his constitutional oath before parliament as Norway's first independent king in 518 years. However, Norway counts 18 November, the day of his election, as the formal beginning of his reign.

=== Coronation ===
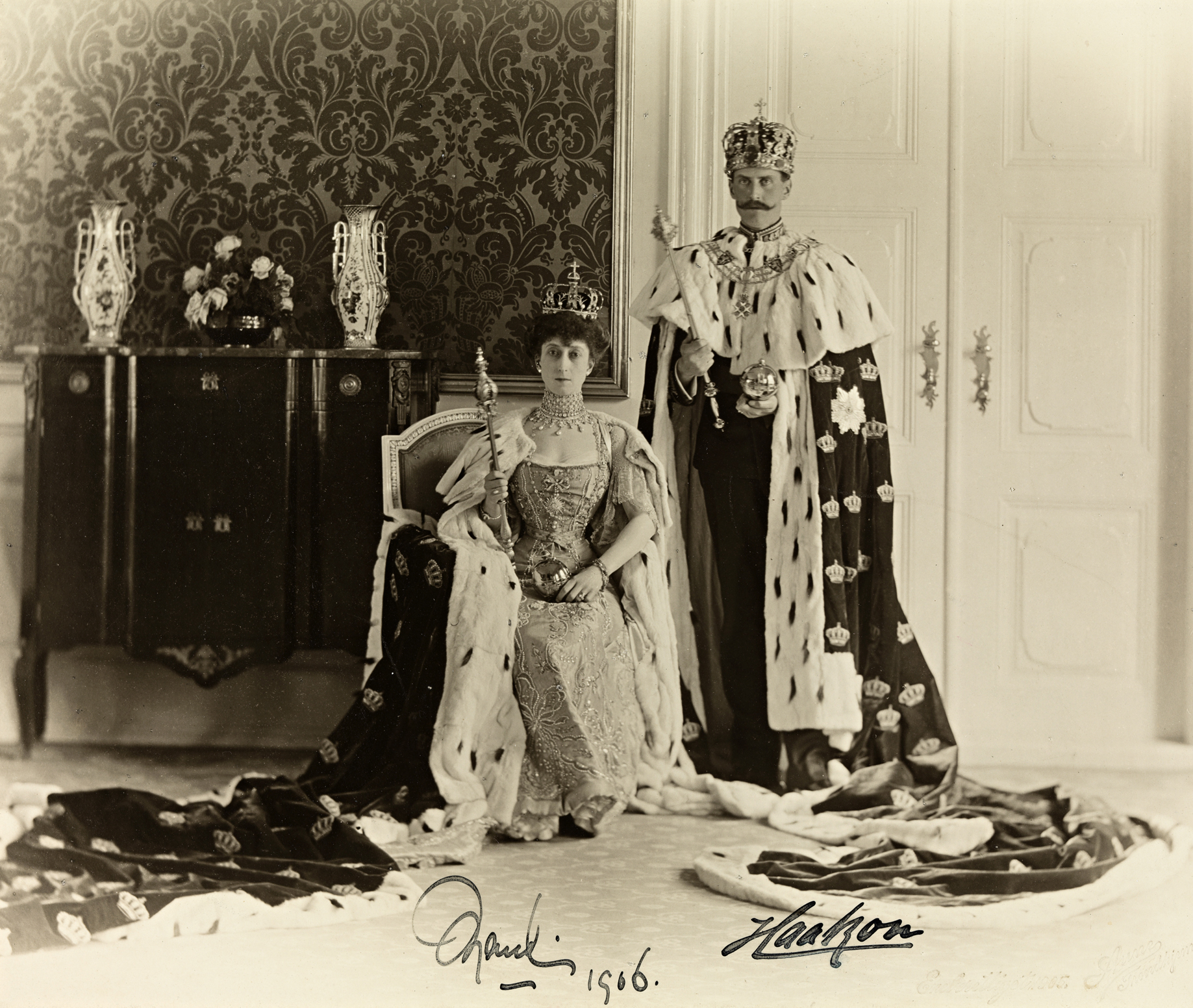
Coronation portrait of King Haakon VII and Queen Maud, 22 June 1906

On 22 June 1906, King Haakon and Queen Maud were solemnly crowned and anointed in the Nidaros Cathedral in Trondheim by the Bishop of Trondheim Vilhelm Andreas Wexelsen. The coronation was in keeping with the constitutional mandate, but many Norwegian statesmen had come to regard coronation rites as "undemocratic and archaic". The coronation clause was deleted from Norway's constitution in 1908, and although coronations are not expressly banned under current Norwegian legislation, this became the most recent coronation of a Norwegian monarch. In the period before and after the coronation, the King and Queen made an extensive coronation journey through Norway.

The King and Queen moved into the Royal Palace in Oslo. Haakon became the first monarch to use the palace permanently and the palace was therefore refurbished for two years before he, Queen Maud and Crown Prince Olav could move in. While the Royal Palace was being refurbished, the King and Queen Maud lived their first year in Norway at the Bygdøy Royal Estate in Oslo which they continued to use frequently as a summer residence. After the coronation, King Haakon and Queen Maud also received the estate Kongesæteren at Holmenkollen in Oslo as a gift from the Norwegian people.

== Early reign ==
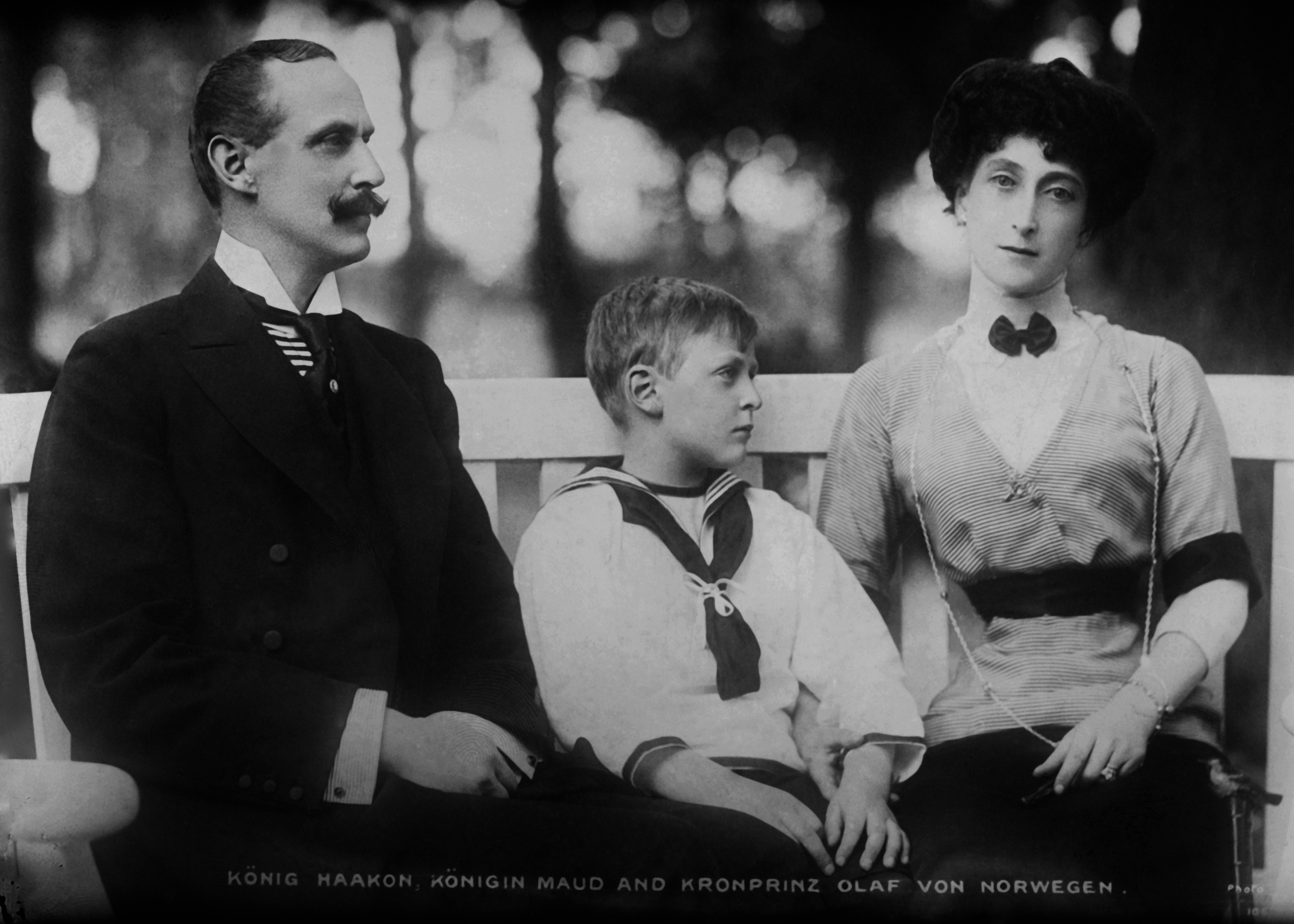
King Haakon VII, Crown Prince Olav and Queen Maud, on 17 July 1913 in Norway

King Haakon gained much sympathy from the Norwegian people. He travelled extensively through Norway. As king, Haakon endeavored to redefine the role of the monarchy in egalitarian Norway and to find a balance between the informal Norwegian way of life and the monarchy's need for formal representation. Although the Constitution of Norway vested him with considerable executive powers, he was not responsible for exercising them. Parliamentary rule had been established in Norway since 1884, earlier than the rest of the Continent. Thus, in practice nearly all major governmental decisions were made by the Government (the Council of State) acting in Haakon's name. Haakon confined himself to non-partisan and representative roles without interfering in politics, a practice continued by his son and grandson. However, his long rule gave him considerable moral authority as a symbol of the country's unity.

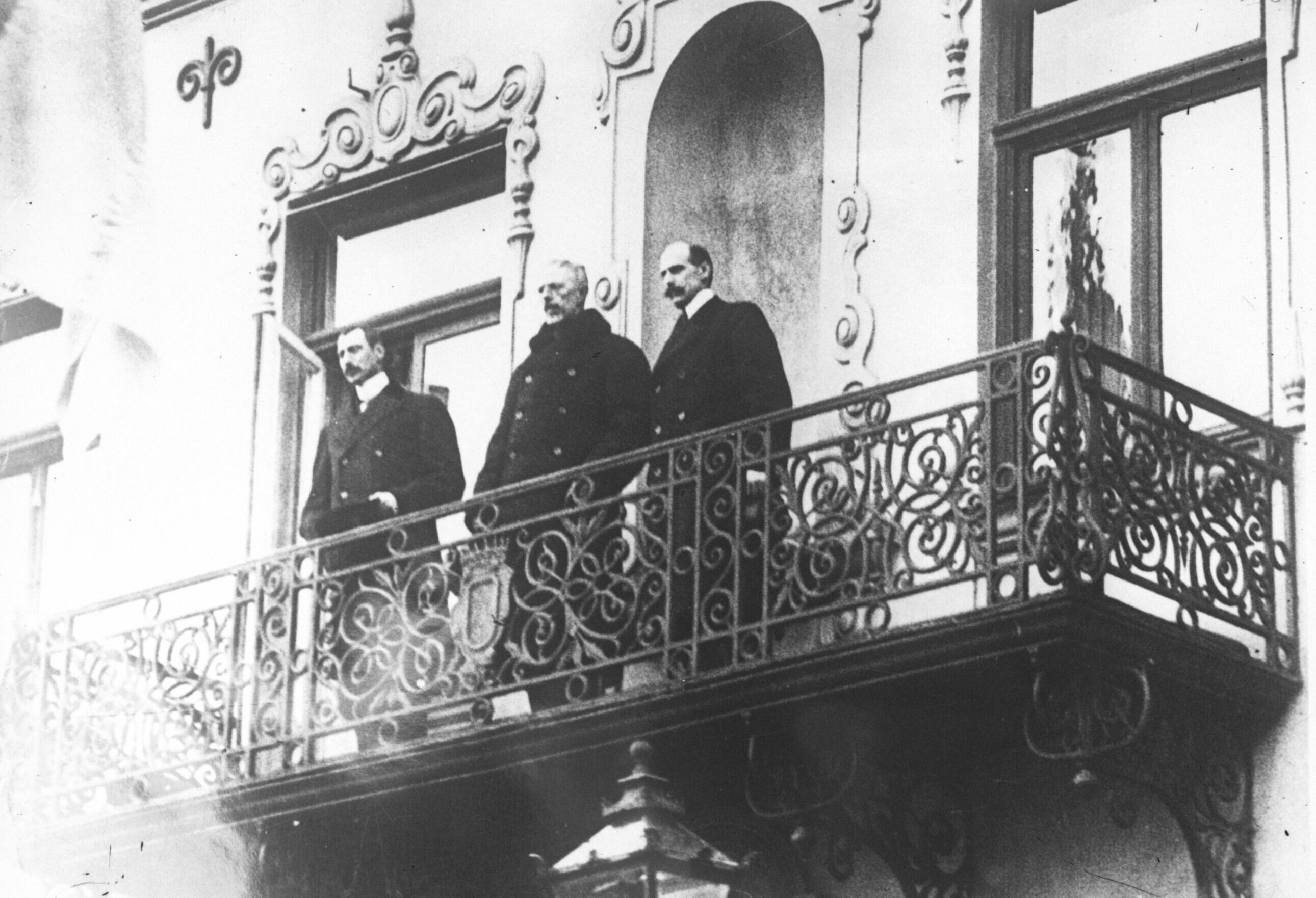
Christian X of Denmark, Gustav V of Sweden and Haakon VII at the meeting of the three Scandinavian kings in Malmö in December 1914.

At the outbreak of the First World War in 1914, the Norwegian government advocated that Norway pursue a policy of neutrality. The King supported the policy of neutrality by participating in the so-called meeting of the Three Kings held on 18 December 1914 in Malmö in Sweden. There, the three Scandinavian monarchs King Haakon, King Christian X of Denmark (Haakon's brother) and King Gustav V of Sweden (Haakon's mother's cousin) met along with their foreign ministers to discuss and emphasize the neutrality of the Nordic countries, and in a joint declaration, confirmed the three states' strict neutrality during the war. The meeting in 1914 was followed by another three-kings meeting in Kristiania in November 1917.

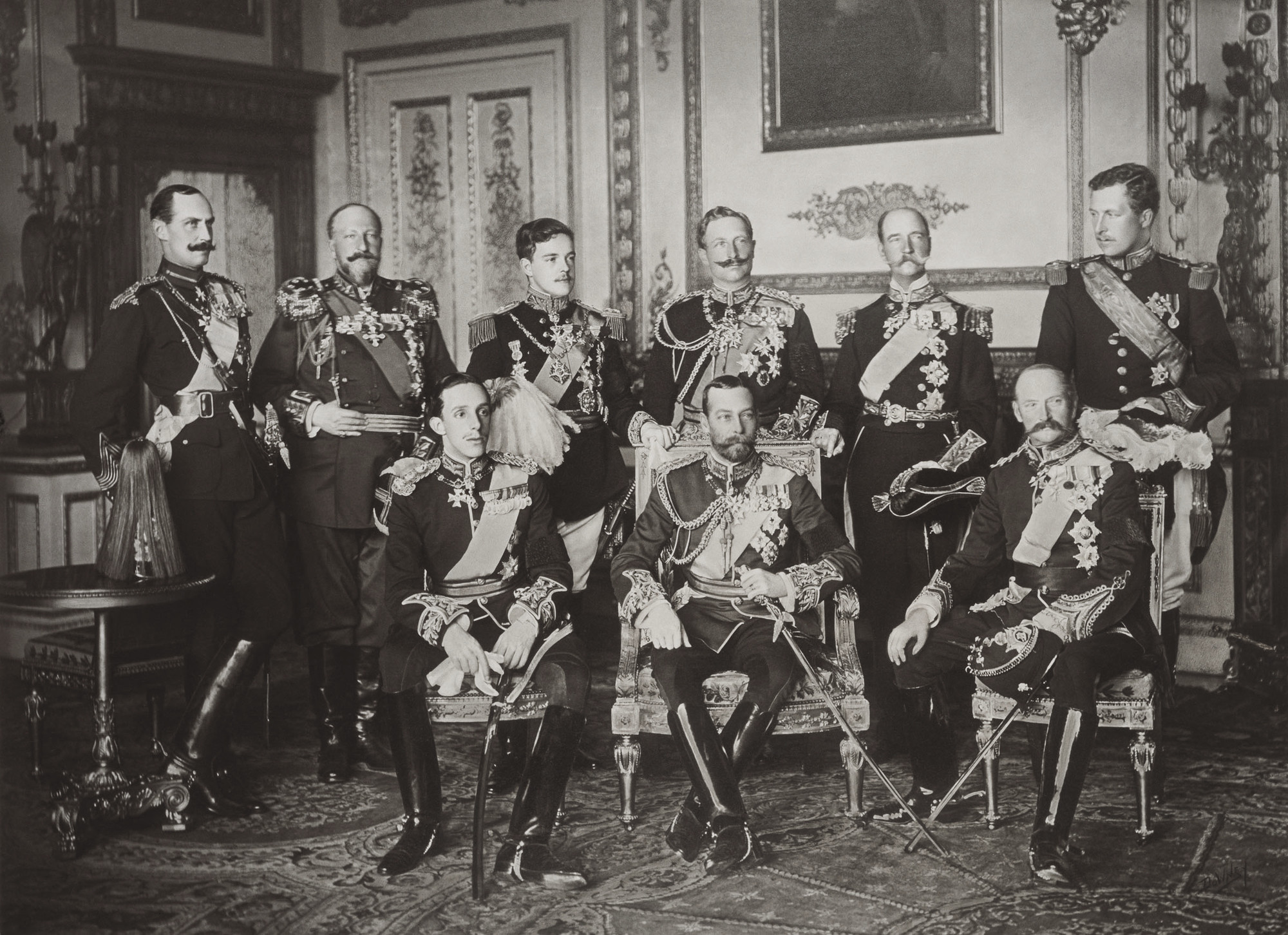
King Haakon with other European sovereigns at the funeral of King Edward VII, photographed on 20 May 1910. Standing, from left to right: King Haakon VII of Norway, Tsar Ferdinand of the Bulgarians, King Manuel II of Portugal and the Algarves, Kaiser Wilhelm II of Germany, King George I of the Hellenes and King Albert I of the Belgians. Seated, from left to right: King Alfonso XIII of Spain, King George V of the United Kingdom and King Frederick VIII of Denmark.

In 1927, the Labour Party became the largest party in parliament and early the following year Norway's first Labour Party government rose to power. The Labour Party was considered to be "revolutionary" by many and the deputy prime minister at the time advised against appointing Christopher Hornsrud as Prime Minister. Haakon, however, refused to abandon parliamentary convention and asked Hornsrud to form a new government. In response to some of his detractors he stated, "I am also the communists’ king." (Norwegian: "Jeg er også kommunistenes konge").

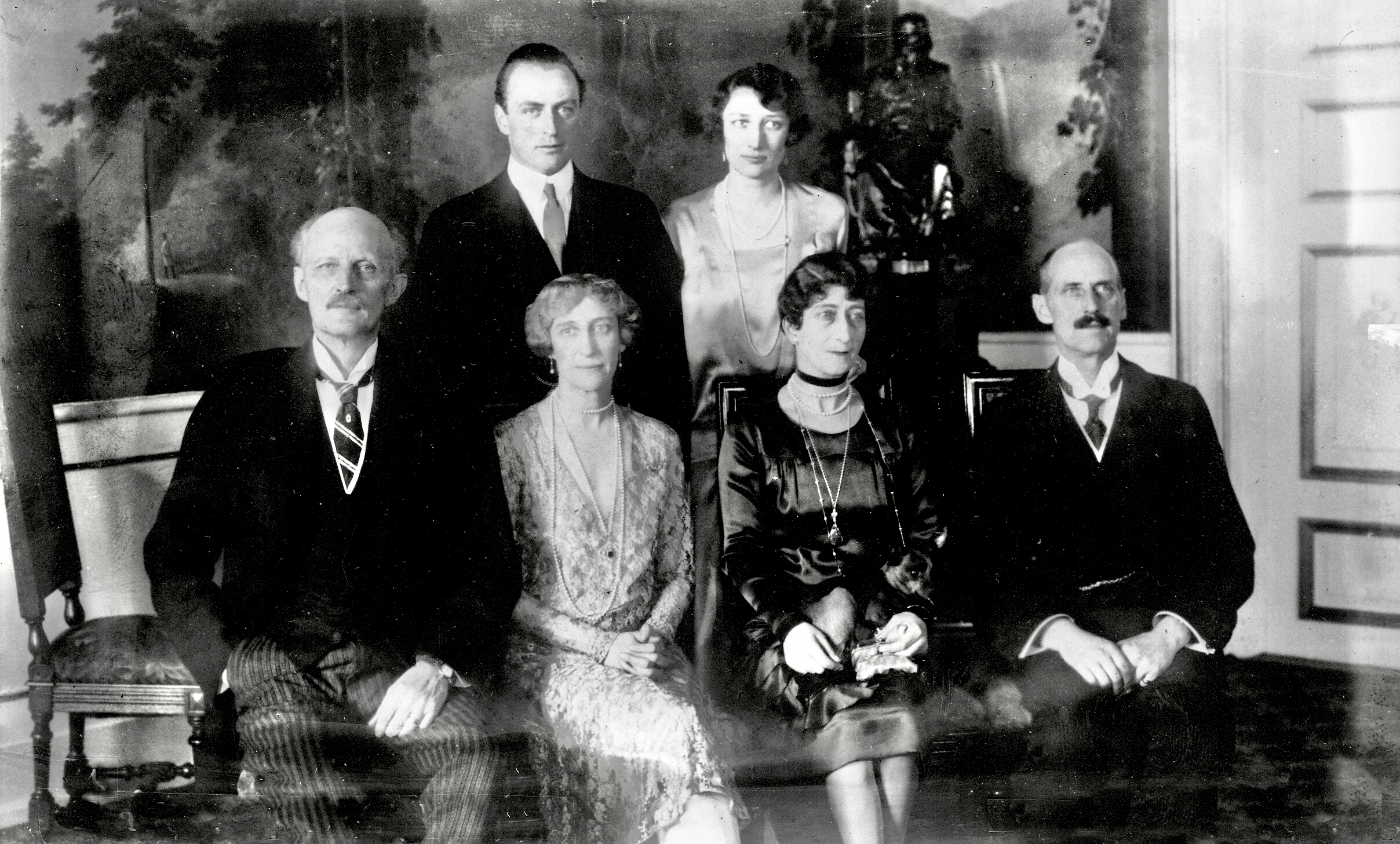
The bride and groom behind their parents at the wedding in 1929.

On 21 March 1929, Crown Prince Olav married his first cousin Princess Märtha of Sweden at the Oslo Cathedral. Princess Märtha was the daughter of Haakon's sister Princess Ingeborg and Prince Carl, Duke of Västergötland. It was the first royal wedding in Norway after the dissolution of the union, and the alliance was met with great enthusiasm, also in Sweden, and it was seen as a sign that all the disharmony after the events of 1905 had now passed. Crown Prince Olav and Crown Princess Märtha were to have three children: Ragnhild (1930–2012), Astrid (1932–2026) and Harald (1937–2026), who was to become king in 1991.

During the Eastern Greenland Case, a territorial dispute between Norway and Denmark about the sovereignty over Eastern Greenland, a very tense atmosphere prevailed. On 5 April 1933, Norway lost the arbitration case which had been submitted to the Permanent Court of International Justice in The Hague. The next day, Aftenposten quoted across the front page the telegram King Haakon had sent to his brother King Christian X:

Have received the wording of the sentence and congratulate Denmark on the result.

Queen Maud died unexpectedly while visiting the United Kingdom on 20 November 1938. In 1939, King Haakon toured southeast Montana and parts of the proposed secessionist state of Absaroka, with supporters of the secession movement claiming this event as formal recognition of their state.

== Resistance during World War II ==
=== The German invasion ===
Norway was invaded by the naval and air forces of Nazi Germany during the early hours of 9 April 1940. The German naval detachment sent to capture Oslo was opposed by Oscarsborg Fortress. The fortress fired at the invaders, sinking the heavy cruiser Blücher and damaging the heavy cruiser Lützow, with heavy German losses that included many soldiers, Gestapo agents, and administrative personnel who were to have occupied the Norwegian capital. This led to the withdrawal of the rest of the German flotilla, preventing the invaders' planned dawn occupation of Oslo. The Germans' delay in occupying Oslo, along with swift action by the president of the Storting, C. J. Hambro, created the opportunity for the royal family, the cabinet, and most of the 150 members of the Storting (parliament) to make a hasty departure from the capital by special train.

The Storting first convened at Hamar the same afternoon, but with the rapid advance of German troops, the group moved on to Elverum. The assembled Storting unanimously enacted a resolution, the so-called Elverum Authorization, granting the cabinet full powers to protect the country until such time as the Storting could meet again.

The next day, Curt Bräuer, the German Ambassador to Norway, demanded a meeting with Haakon. The German diplomat called on Haakon to accept Adolf Hitler's demands to end all resistance and appoint Vidkun Quisling as prime minister. Quisling, the leader of Norway's fascist party, the Nasjonal Samling, had declared himself prime minister hours earlier in Oslo as head of what would be a German puppet government; had Haakon formally appointed him, it would effectively have given legal sanction to the invasion. Bräuer suggested that Haakon follow the example of the Danish government and his brother, Christian X, which had surrendered almost immediately after the previous day's invasion, and threatened Norway with harsh reprisals if it did not surrender. Haakon told Bräuer that he could not make the decision himself, but could only act on the advice of the Government.

In a meeting in Nybergsund, the King reported the German ultimatum to the cabinet sitting as a council of state. Haakon told the cabinet:

I am deeply affected by the responsibility laid on me if the German demand is rejected. The responsibility for the calamities that will befall people and country is indeed so grave that I dread to take it. It rests with the government to decide, but my position is clear.

For my part I cannot accept the German demands. It would conflict with all that I have considered to be my duty as King of Norway since I came to this country nearly thirty-five years ago.

Haakon went on to say that he could not appoint Quisling as prime minister, since he knew neither the people nor the Storting had confidence in him. However, if the cabinet felt otherwise, the King said he would abdicate so as not to stand in the way of the Government's decision.

Nils Hjelmtveit, Minister of Church and Education, later wrote:

This made a great impression on us all. More clearly than ever before, we could see the man behind the words; the king who had drawn a line for himself and his task, a line from which he could not deviate. We had through the five years [in government] learned to respect and appreciate our king, and now, through his words, he came to us as a great man, just and forceful; a leader in these fatal times to our country.

Inspired by Haakon's stand, the government unanimously advised him not to appoint any government headed by Quisling. Within hours, it telephoned its refusal to Bräuer. That night, NRK broadcast the government's rejection of the German demands to the Norwegian people. In that same broadcast, the government announced that it would resist the German invasion as long as possible, and expressed their confidence that Norwegians would lend their support to the cause.

After Norway was eventually conquered, Quisling "transformed [the country] into a one-party fascist state and recruited 6,000 Norwegians to fight alongside the Germans on the Russian front". A very small percentage of the population supported Quisling and many joined the Norwegian resistance movement. After the war, Quisling was convicted of treason and executed.

=== Norwegian campaign ===
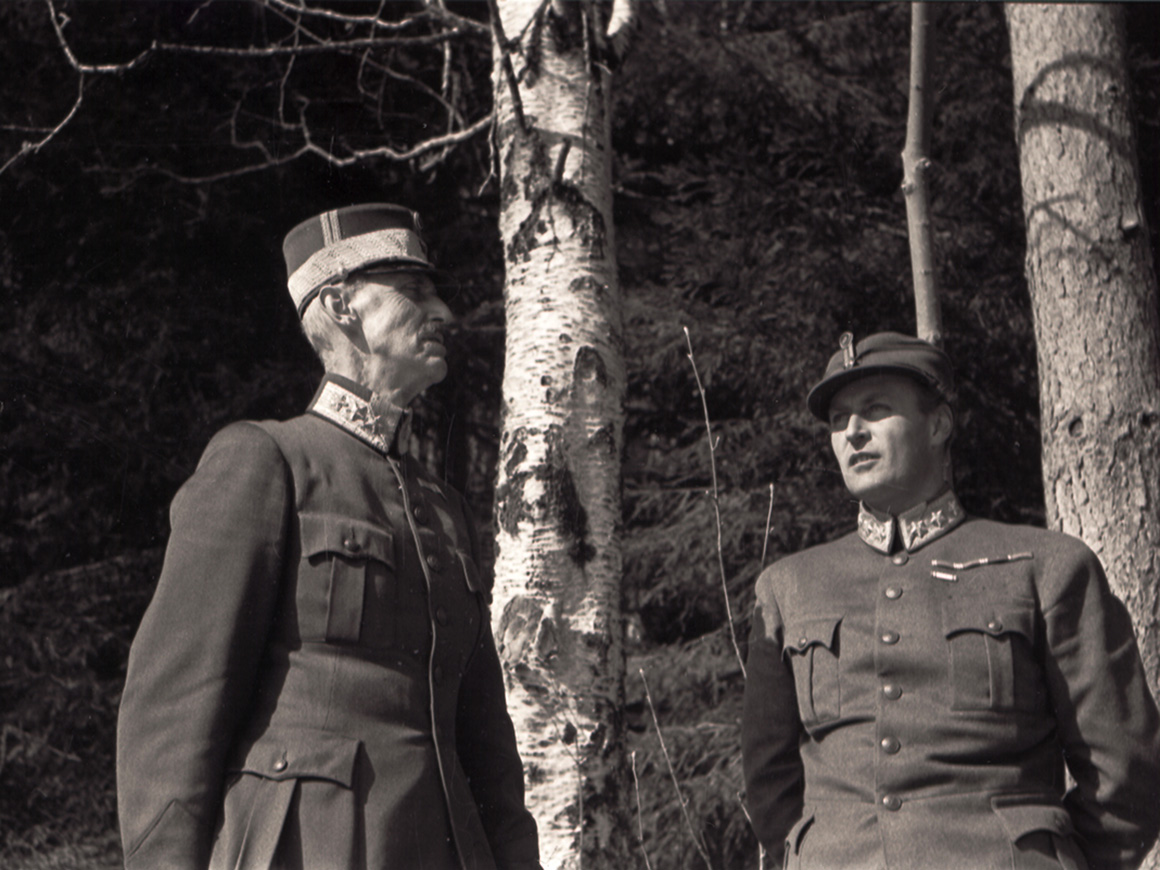
King Haakon VII and Crown Prince Olav seeking shelter on the outskirts of Molde during a German bombing raid on the city in April 1940. The tree in the center became famous as the Royal Birch (Norwegian: Kongebjørka).

The following morning, 11 April 1940, in an attempt to wipe out Norway's unyielding king and government, Luftwaffe bombers attacked Nybergsund, destroying the small town where the Government was staying. Neutral Sweden was only 26 kilometres (16 mi) away, but the Swedish government decided it would "detain and incarcerate" King Haakon if he crossed their border (which Haakon never forgave). The Norwegian king and his ministers took refuge in the snow-covered woods and escaped harm, continuing farther north through the mountains toward Molde on Norway's west coast. As the British forces in the area lost ground under Luftwaffe bombardment, the King and his party were taken aboard the British cruiser HMS Glasgow at Molde and conveyed a further 1,000 kilometres (620 mi) north to Tromsø, where a provisional capital was established on 1 May. Haakon and Crown Prince Olav took up residence in a forest cabin in Målselvdalen valley in inner Troms County, where they would stay until evacuation to the United Kingdom.

The Allies had a fairly secure hold over northern Norway until late May. The situation was dramatically altered, however, by their deteriorating situation in the Battle of France. With the Germans rapidly overrunning France, the Allied high command decided that the forces in northern Norway should be withdrawn. The royal family and Norwegian government were evacuated from Tromsø on 7 June aboard HMS Devonshire with a total of 461 passengers. This evacuation became extremely costly for the Royal Navy when the German warships Scharnhorst and Gneisenau attacked and sank the nearby aircraft carrier HMS Glorious with its escorting destroyers HMS Acasta and HMS Ardent. Devonshire did not rebroadcast the enemy sighting report made by Glorious as it could not disclose its position by breaking radio silence. No other British ship received the sighting report, and 1,519 British officers and men and three warships were lost. Devonshire arrived safely in London and King Haakon and his Cabinet set up a Norwegian government in exile in the British capital.

=== Government in exile ===
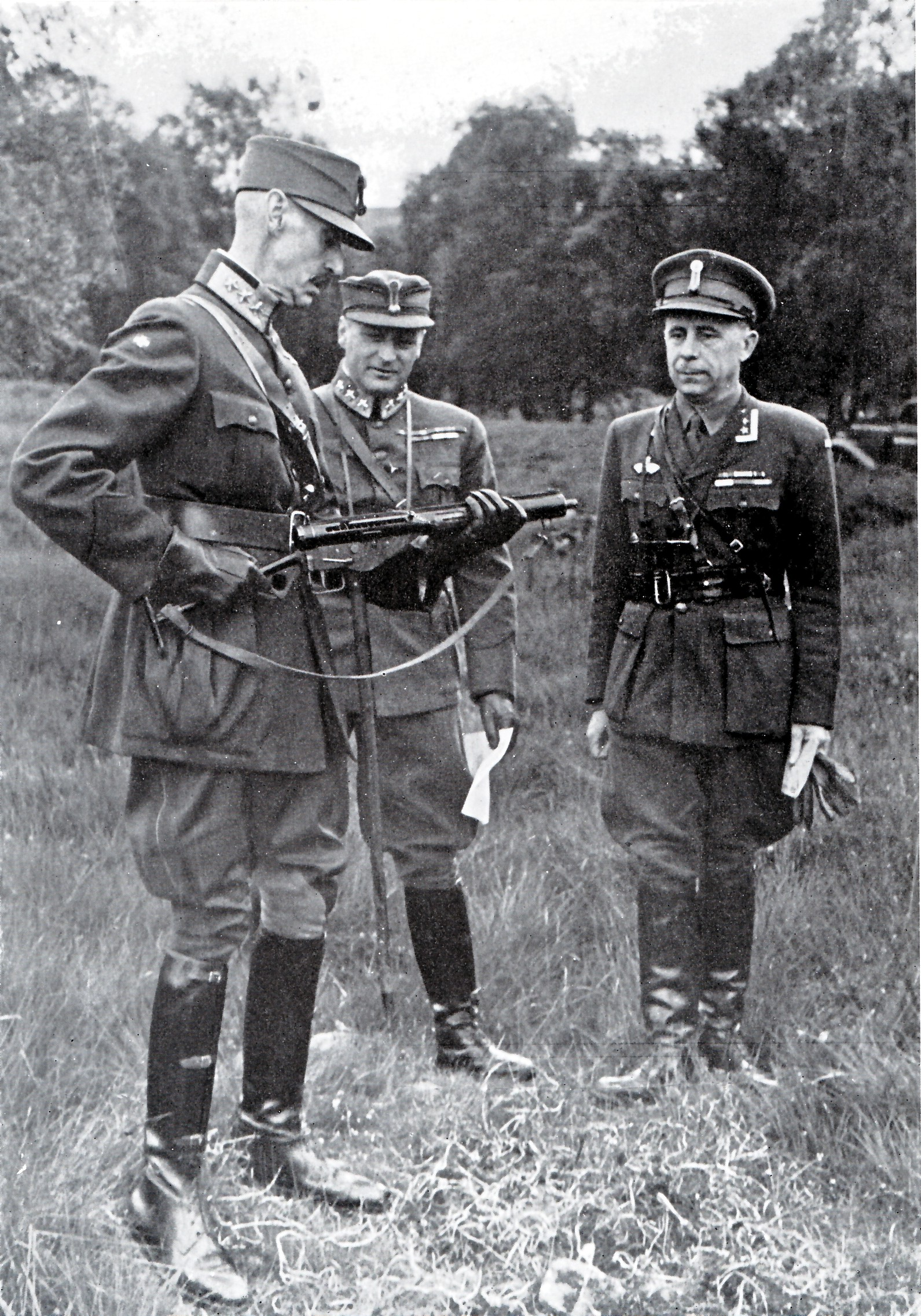
King Haakon VII, Crown Prince Olav, and Hans Reidar Holtermann in Scotland during World War II.

Initially, King Haakon and Crown Prince Olav were guests at Buckingham Palace, but at the start of the London Blitz in September 1940, they moved to Bowdown House in Berkshire. The construction of the adjacent RAF Greenham Common airfield in March 1942 prompted another move to Foliejon Park in Winkfield, near Windsor, in Berkshire, where they remained until the liberation of Norway.

Haakon also spent time at Carbisdale Castle in Sutherland, Scotland, made available for his use by Theodore Salvesen, a ship-owner of Norwegian extraction.

The King's official residence was the Norwegian Legation at 10 Palace Green, Kensington, which became the seat of the Norwegian government in exile. Here Haakon attended weekly Cabinet meetings and worked on the speeches which were regularly broadcast by radio to Norway by the BBC World Service. These broadcasts helped to cement Haakon's position as an important national symbol to the Norwegian resistance. Many broadcasts were made from Saint Olav's Norwegian Church in Rotherhithe, where the royal family were regular worshippers.

Meanwhile, Hitler had appointed Josef Terboven as Reichskommissar for Norway. On Hitler's orders, Terboven attempted to coerce the Storting to depose the King; the Storting declined, citing constitutional principles. A subsequent ultimatum was made by the Germans, threatening to intern all Norwegians of military age in German concentration camps. With this threat looming, the Storting's representatives in Oslo wrote to their monarch on 27 June, asking him to abdicate. The King declined, politely replying that the Storting was acting under duress. The King gave his answer on 3 July, and proclaimed it on BBC radio on 8 July.

After one further German attempt in September to force the Storting to depose Haakon failed, Terboven finally decreed that the royal family had "forfeited their right to return" and dissolved the democratic political parties.

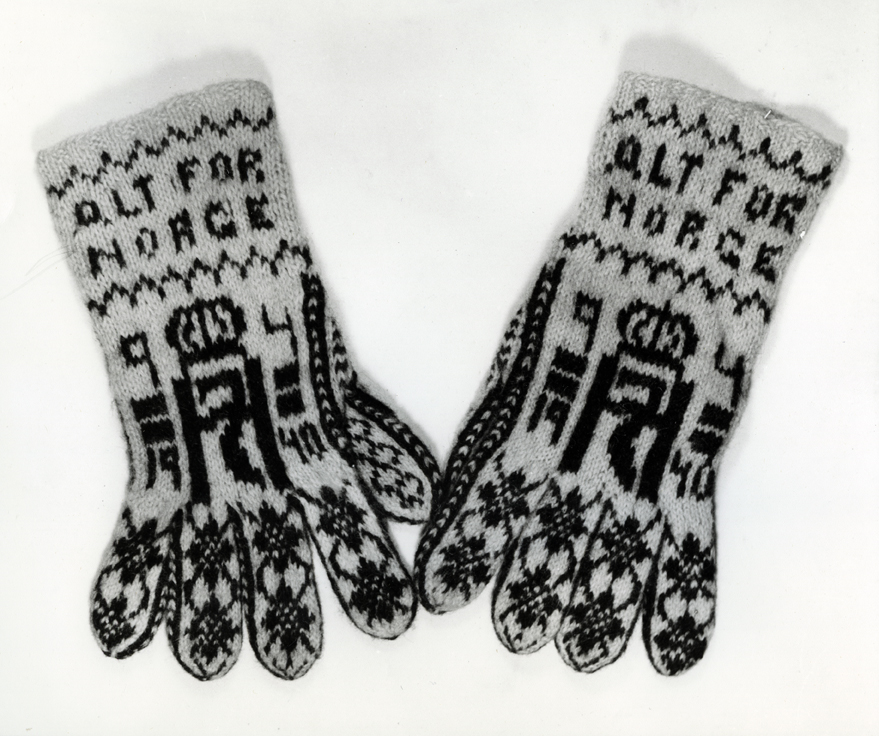
The King's monogram became a symbol of resistance during the Second World War

During Norway's five years under German control, many Norwegians surreptitiously wore clothing or jewellery made from coins bearing Haakon's "H7" monogram as symbols of resistance to the German occupation and of solidarity with their exiled King and Government, just as many people in Denmark wore his brother's monogram on a pin. The King's monogram was also painted and otherwise reproduced on various surfaces as a show of resistance to the occupation.

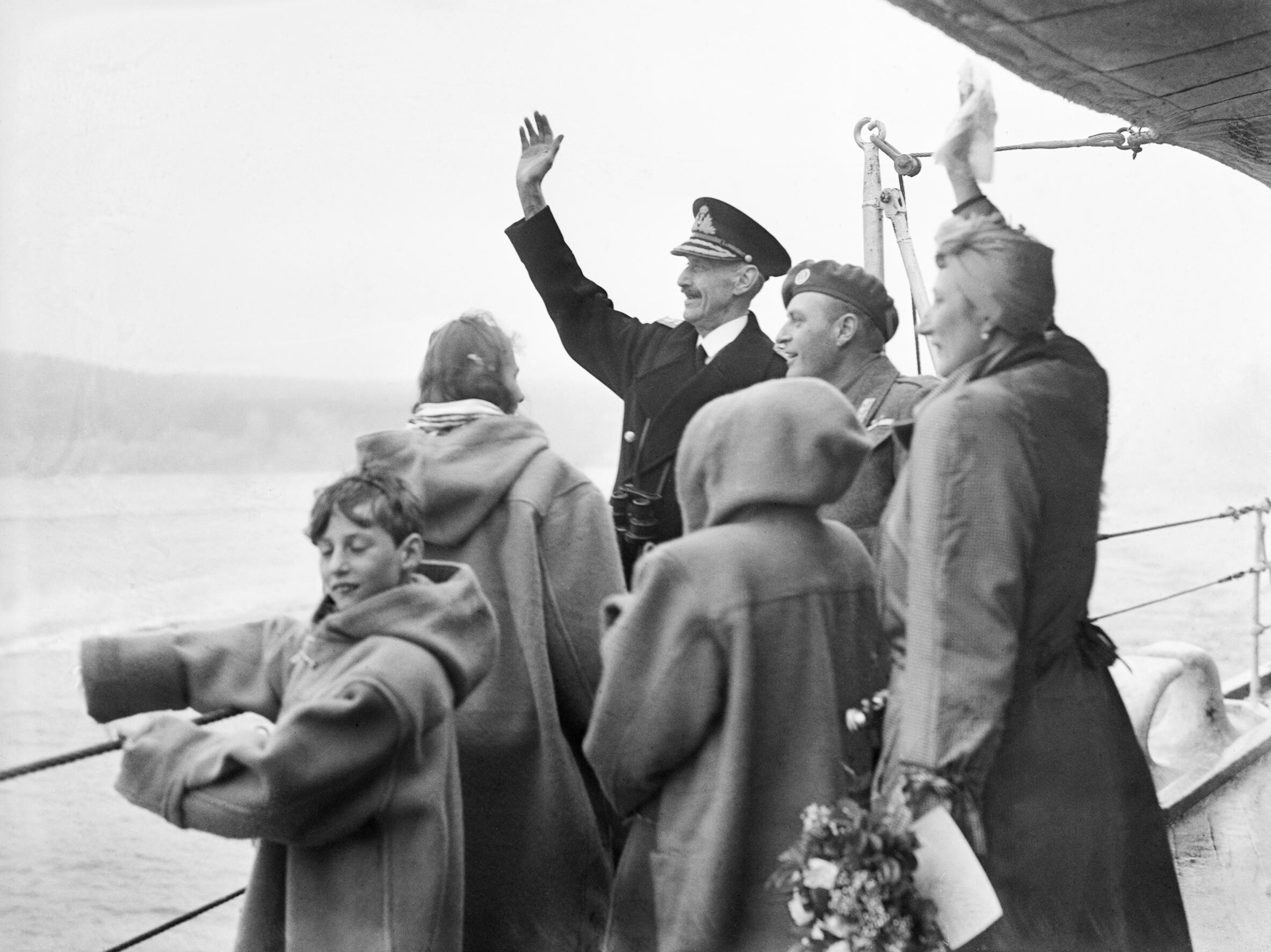
The royal family of Norway waving to the welcoming crowds from HMS Norfolk at Oslo, June 1945.

Nazi Germany controlled Norway until the capitulation of German forces in Europe on 8 May 1945. After the end of the war, Crown Prince Olav and five government ministers returned to a liberated Norway on 13 May 1945. Haakon and the rest of the Norwegian royal family returned to Norway aboard the cruiser HMS Norfolk, arriving with the First Cruiser Squadron to cheering crowds in Oslo on 7 June 1945, exactly five years after they had been evacuated from Tromsø.

== Post-war years ==
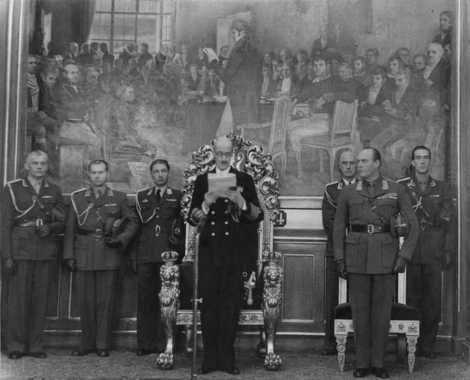
King Haakon VII reading the Speech from the Throne to the Storting in 1950, Crown Prince Olav on his right side

After his return, Haakon did not continue the political role that he had played during the war, and limited himself to his constitutional duties as head of state. In the late summer of 1945 he went on an extensive tour of Norway to examine the war damage and to give consolation to the population. Because of his role during the war and his personal integrity, Haakon VII was considered the highest moral authority in the country and enjoyed great esteem in all classes of the population.

In 1947, the Norwegian people, by public subscription, purchased the royal yacht Norge for the King.

In 1952, he attended the funeral of his wife's nephew King George VI and openly wept.

The King's granddaughter, Princess Ragnhild, married businessman Erling Lorentzen (of the Lorentzen family) on 15 May 1953, being the first member of the new Norwegian royal family to marry a commoner.

Haakon lived to see two of his great-grandchildren born; Haakon Lorentzen (b. 23 August 1954) and Ingeborg Lorentzen (b. 3 February 1957).

Crown Princess Märtha died of cancer on 5 April 1954.

King Haakon VII fell in his bathroom at the Bygdøy Royal Estate (Bygdøy kongsgård) in July 1955. This fall, which occurred just a month before his eighty-third birthday, resulted in a fracture to the thighbone and, although there were few other complications resulting from the fall, the King was left using a wheelchair. The once-active King was said to have been depressed by his resulting helplessness and began to lose his customary involvement and interest in current events. With Haakon's loss of mobility, and as his health deteriorated further in the summer of 1957, Crown Prince Olav appeared on behalf of his father on ceremonial occasions and took a more active role in state affairs.

The Norwegian Post Office issued three sets of commemorative postage stamps to honour their King:

1952 – Two stamps issued 2 August to celebrate the King's 80th birthday. 1955 – Two stamps issued 25 November to celebrate the King's 50 years on the throne. 1957 – Two stamps issued 3 August to celebrate the King's 85th birthday.

An additional set was issued in 1972 to commemorate the late King's 100th anniversary of his birth.

=== Death and succession ===
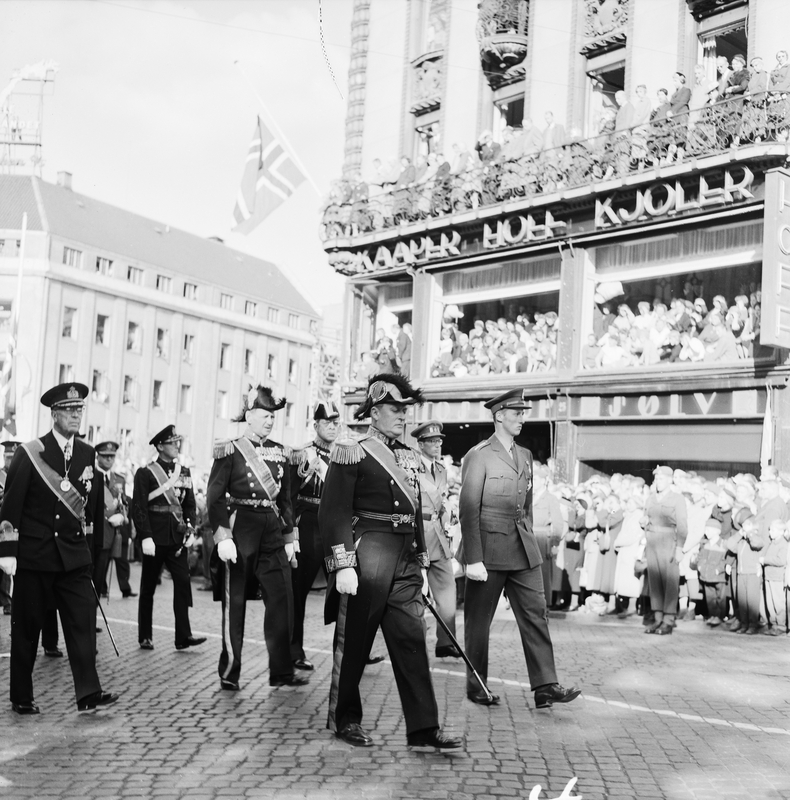
Funeral procession of King Haakon VII with King Olav V and Crown Prince Harald at the front, followed by (from left) King Gustaf VI Adolf of Sweden and King Frederik IX of Denmark.

Haakon died at the Royal Palace in Oslo on 21 September 1957. He was 85 years old. At his death, Olav succeeded him as Olav V. Haakon was buried on 1 October 1957 alongside his wife in the white sarcophagus in the Royal Mausoleum at Akershus Fortress. He was the last surviving son of King Frederick VIII of Denmark.

== Legacy ==
Haakon VII is regarded by many as one of the greatest Norwegian leaders of the pre-war period, managing to hold his young and fragile country together in unstable political conditions. He was ranked highly in the Norwegian of the Century poll in 2005.

== Honours ==
Royal cypher.

The King Haakon VII Sea in East Antarctica is named in the king's honour as well as the entire plateau surrounding the South Pole was named King Haakon VII Vidde by Roald Amundsen when he in 1911 became the first human to reach the South Pole. See Polheim.

In 1914 Haakon County in the American state of South Dakota was named in his honour.

Two Royal Norwegian Navy ships—King Haakon VII, an escort ship in commission from 1942 to 1951, and Haakon VII, a training ship in commission from 1958 to 1974—have been named after King Haakon VII.

For his struggles against the Nazi regime and his effort to revive the Holmenkollen ski festival following World War II, King Haakon VII earned the Holmenkollen medal in 1955 (Shared with Hallgeir Brenden, Veikko Hakulinen, and Sverre Stenersen), one of only 11 people not famous for Nordic skiing to receive this honour. (The others are Norway's Stein Eriksen, Borghild Niskin, Inger Bjørnbakken, Astrid Sandvik, King Olav V (his son), Erik Håker, Jacob Vaage, King Harald V (his paternal grandson), and Queen Sonja (his paternal granddaughter-in-law), and Sweden's Ingemar Stenmark).

Honorary military appointments

- Admiral of the Royal Danish Navy, 20 November 1905, created by his father King Frederick VIII.
- Honorary Admiral of the Royal Navy
  - Honorary Lieutenant in the Royal Navy, 7 February 1901, created by his father-in-law King Edward VII shortly after his accession.
- Honorary Colonel of the Royal Artillery
- Honorary Colonel of the Norfolk Yeomanry, 11 June 1902 – 21 September 1957
- Colonel-in-Chief, The Green Howards, 12 May 1942 – 21 September 1957

=== National honours ===
- Norway:
  - Recipient of the War Cross Medal
  - Recipient of the Medal for Outstanding Civic Service, Special Class
- Denmark:
  - Knight of the Order of the Elephant, 3 August 1890
  - Knight Grand Commander of the Order of the Dannebrog, 28 July 1912
  - Member of the Decoration of the Cross of Honour of the Dannebrog, 3 August 1890
  - King Christian X's Freedom Medal
  - Commemorative Medal for King Christian IX and Queen Louise's Golden Wedding Anniversary
  - Commemorative Medal for King Christian IX's 100th birthday
  - Commemorative Medal for King Frederik VIII's 100th birthday

Foreign

- Austria: Grand Star of the Decoration of Honour for Services to the Republic of Austria
- Belgium: Grand Cordon of the Order of Leopold (military), 2 October 1906
- Brazil: Grand Cross of the Southern Cross, with Collar
- Czechoslovakia:
  - Grand Cross of the White Lion, 1937
  - Czechoslovak War Cross 1939–1945
- (Ethiopian Empire) Ethiopian Imperial Family: Collar of the Order of Solomon
- Finland: Grand Cross of the White Rose, with Collar, 1926
- France:
  - Grand Cross of the Legion of Honour
  - Cross of War (1939–1945)
  - Médaille Militaire
- (Greece) Greek royal family:
  - War Cross, 1940
  - Grand Cross of the Redeemer, 1947
- Iceland: Grand Cross of the Falcon, with Collar, 1955
- (Kingdom of Italy) Italian royal family: Knight of the Annunciation, 12 April 1909
- Japan: Collar of the Order of the Chrysanthemum
- (German Empire) German imperial and royal family:
  - Knight of the Black Eagle
  - Grand Cross of the Red Eagle
  - Mecklenburg Grand Ducal Family: Grand Cross of the Wendish Crown, with Crown in Ore
- Netherlands: Grand Cross of the Netherlands Lion
- Peru: Grand Cross of the Sun of Peru, in Diamonds, 1922
- Poland: Knight of the White Eagle, 1930
- (Kingdom of Portugal) Portuguese royal family:
  - Grand Cross of the Sash of the Three Orders
  - Grand Cross of the Tower and Sword
- (Kingdom of Romania) Romanian royal family: Grand Cross of the Order of Carol I, with Collar
- (Russian Empire) Russian imperial family:
  - Knight of St. Andrew
  - Knight of St. Alexander Nevsky
  - Knight of the White Eagle
  - Knight of St. Anna, 1st Class
  - Knight of St. Stanislaus, 1st Class
- Spain: Knight of the Golden Fleece, with Collar, 16 July 1910
- Sweden: Knight of the Seraphim, 30 May 1893
- Thailand: Knight of the Order of the Royal House of Chakri
- (Ottoman Empire) Turkish Imperial Family: Order of Osmanieh, 1st Class in Diamonds
- United Kingdom:
  - Honorary Knight Grand Cross of the Order of the Bath (civil), 21 July 1896
  - Honorary Knight Grand Cross of the Royal Victorian Order, 2 February 1901 – on the day of the funeral of Queen Victoria
  - Royal Victorian Chain, 9 August 1902
  - Knight of the Garter, 9 November 1906
  - Associate Bailiff Grand Cross of St. John, 12 June 1926
  - Queen Victoria Diamond Jubilee Medal
  - King Edward VII Coronation Medal
  - Honorary Citizen of Largs, Scotland

== In popular culture ==
Haakon was portrayed by Jakob Cedergren in the 2009 NRK drama series Harry & Charles, a series that focused on the events leading up to the election of King Haakon in 1905. Jesper Christensen portrayed the King in the 2016 film The King's Choice (Kongens nei) which was based on the events surrounding the German invasion of Norway and the King's decision to resist. The film won widespread critical acclaim, and was Norway's submission for the Academy Award for Best Foreign Language Film at the 89th Academy Awards. The film made the shortlist of nine finalists in December 2016. Haakon was portrayed by Søren Pilmark in the 2020 NRK drama series Atlantic Crossing, a series regarding Crown Princess Märtha's handling of the royal family exile from 1939 to 1945.

== Issue ==
Name	Birth	Death	Notes
Olav V	2 July 1903	17 January 1991	King of Norway 1957–1991; married 1929, Princess Märtha of Sweden; had issue; descendants include Harald V of Norway

== See also ==
- List of state visits made by Haakon VII of Norway
- List of covers of Time magazine (1920s), (1930s)

Haakon VII House of Schleswig-Holstein-Sonderburg-Glücksburg Cadet branch of the House of Oldenburg Born: 3 August 1872 Died: 21 September 1957
Regnal titles
Vacant Title last held by Oscar II	King of Norway; 1905–1957	Succeeded by Olav V
