= Princess Ragnhild of Norway =

Norwegian princess (1930–2012)

Princess Ragnhild
- Born: 9 June 1930; Royal Palace, Oslo, Norway
- Died: 16 September 2012 (aged 82); Rio de Janeiro, Brazil
- Burial: 28 September 2012; Asker Church Cemetery, Oslo, Norway
- Spouse: Erling Lorentzen (m. 1953)
- Issue: Haakon Lorentzen; Ingeborg Lorentzen; Ragnhild Lorentzen
Names
- Ragnhild Alexandra
- House: Glücksburg
- Father: Olav V of Norway
- Mother: Märtha of Sweden

Princess Ragnhild, Mrs. Lorentzen (Ragnhild Alexandra; 9 June 1930 – 16 September 2012), was the eldest child of King Olav V of Norway and Princess Märtha of Sweden and the older sister of King Harald V. She was the first Norwegian royal baby to have been born in Norway since the Middle Ages. In 1953, she married the industrialist Erling Lorentzen, a member of the Lorentzen family of shipping magnates. In the same year, they moved to Brazil, where her husband was an industrialist and a main owner of Aracruz Celulose. She lived in Brazil until her death 59 years later.

Although she was the King's eldest child, she was never in the line of succession to the Norwegian throne, owing to Norway's then law of agnatic succession. She was in the line of succession to the British throne and occupied the 16th and 17th places during her childhood and youth.

== Early life ==
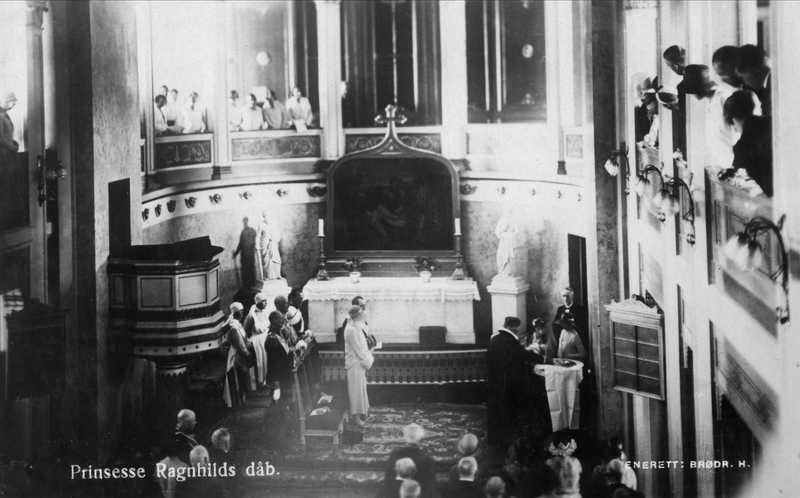
Ragnhild's christening in the Palace Chapel at the Royal Palace in Oslo in 1930, the first christening of a princess in Norway for 629 years.

Ragnhild was born on 9 June 1930 at the Royal Palace in Oslo, Norway, the first child of the then Crown Prince Olav (later King Olav V) and Crown Princess Märtha of Norway. She was the first Norwegian princess to have been born on Norwegian soil for 629 years. At a meeting of the Council of State convened after the birth, her grandfather King Haakon VII announced that she would bear the names "Ragnhild Alexandra". She was christened in the Palace Chapel on 27 June 1930. Her godparents were her paternal grandparents, the King and Queen of Norway; her maternal grandparents, the Duke and Duchess of Västergötland; her great-uncle, the King of Sweden; her great-aunt, Princess Victoria of the United Kingdom; her maternal aunt, Princess Axel of Denmark; and the Duke of York.

Although Ragnhild was Olav's eldest child, she could not become Queen regnant of Norway, as under Salic law women were excluded from succession at the time. Before the birth of her younger brother, it was assumed she would accede to the throne in the absence of a male heir. After the birth of her sister Princess Astrid in 1932, preparations were made at government level for the required constitutional amendment. Her brother, Harald (later King Harald V), was born in 1937. She was a great-great-granddaughter of Queen Victoria of the United Kingdom and great-granddaughter of Edward VII of the United Kingdom, making her a second cousin of Queen Elizabeth II.

Ragnhild grew up with her siblings at the royal residence of Skaugum near Asker, west of Oslo. In 1940, during World War II, she and her family fled the German invasion of Norway, and she spent the wartime years in exile with her mother and siblings in Bethesda, Maryland.

Following the royal family's return to Norway she attended Nissen's Girls' School and obtained her school leaving certificate in 1948. Her confirmation took place on 11 May 1947 in the Palace Chapel. She later spent four semesters, between 1948 and 1949, studying at a finishing school in Lausanne, Switzerland.

== Marriage and family ==
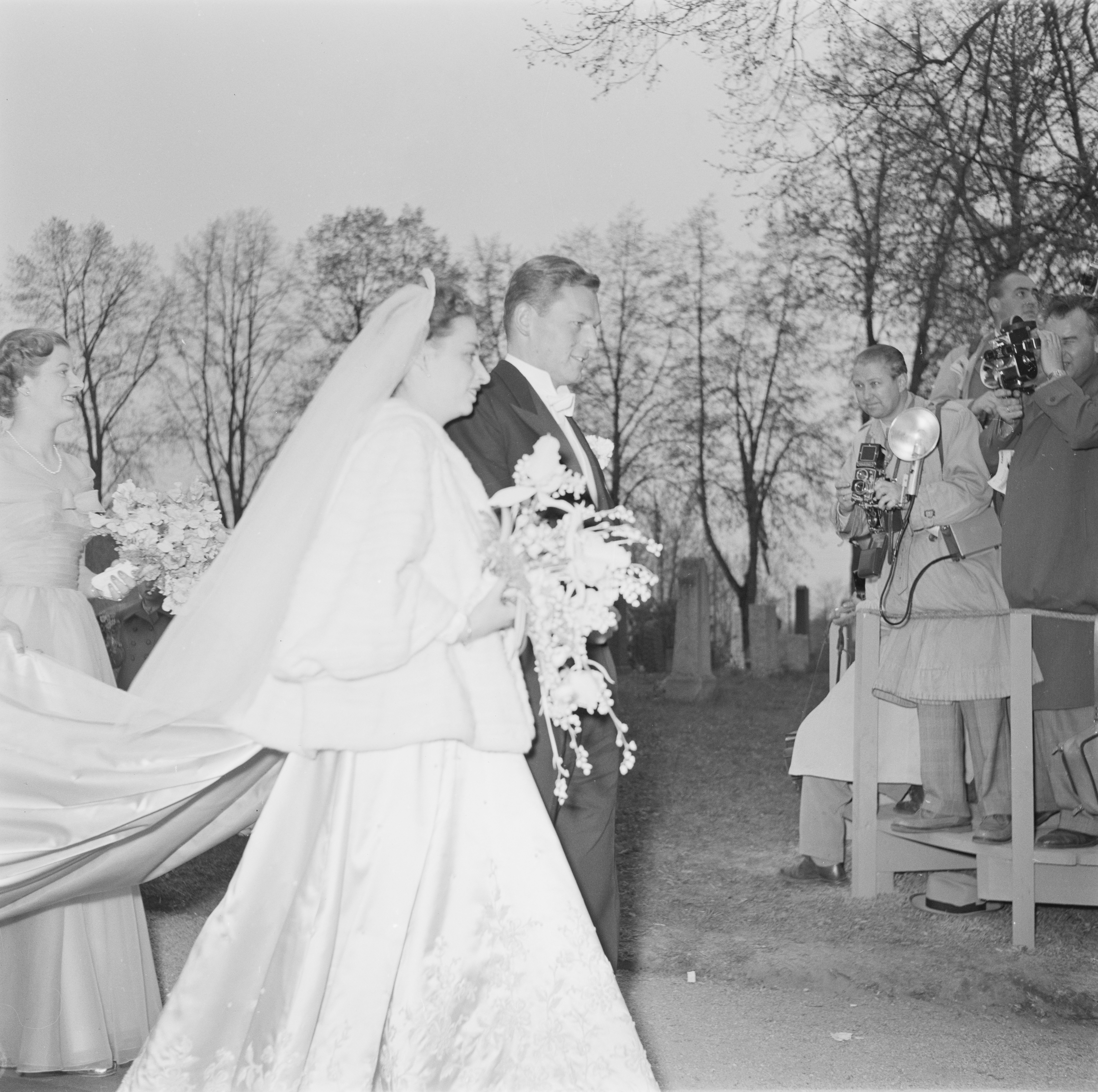
Ragnhild and Lorentzen on their wedding day

Ragnhild married Erling Lorentzen (1923–2021), a member of the Norwegian merchant upper class (see Lorentzen family), in Asker Church on 15 May 1953. Lorentzen was a businessman and army officer who had served as her bodyguard shortly after the war.

Following their marriage, the couple moved to Rio de Janeiro, where Lorentzen had substantial business holdings. Their residence in Brazil was originally temporary, but they eventually settled there. The couple had three children.

== Public life ==
Ragnhild opened the 1952 Winter Olympics in Oslo, Norway, as her father and grandfather were attending the funeral of King George VI.

A conservative, Ragnhild publicly criticised her niece and nephew, Princess Märtha Louise and Haakon VIII (then Crown Prince Haakon Magnus), for their choice of spouses in 2004.

Ragnhild was patron of the Norwegian Organisation for the Hearing Impaired.

Several ships, including MS Prinsesse Ragnhild, were named for her.

Although a private person, in 1995 she decided to write her autobiography, penned with the help of author Lars O. Gulbrandsen and published under the title Mitt liv som kongsdatter [My Life as a King's Daughter].

== Death ==
Ragnhild died of lung cancer at her home in Rio de Janeiro on 16 September 2012, aged 82. Her body arrived in Oslo on 24 September 2012, where her brother Harald and her sister Astrid were present to receive her alongside her spouse Erling and their children. Her funeral was held on 28 September in the chapel of the Royal Palace of Oslo. Crown Princess Victoria of Sweden attended her funeral. Ragnhild was later cremated and privately interred in the cemetery of the church of Asker.

== Titles, styles and honours ==
=== Titles ===
Styles of Princess Ragnhild, Mrs. Lorentzen
- Reference style: Her Highness
- Spoken style: Your Highness

- 9 June 1930 – 15 May 1953: Her Royal Highness Princess Ragnhild of Norway
- 15 May 1953 – 16 September 2012: Her Highness Princess Ragnhild, Mrs. Lorentzen

=== Honours ===
==== National honours ====
- Norway: Knight Grand Cross of the Order of St. Olav
- Norway: Dame of the Royal Family Decoration King Haakon VII
- Norway: Dame of the Royal Family Decoration of King Olav V
- Norway: Dame of the Royal Family Decoration of King Harald V
- Norway: Recipient of the King Haakon VII Golden Jubilee Medal
- Norway: Recipient of the Medal of the 100th Anniversary of the Birth of King Haakon VII
- Norway: Recipient of the King Olav V Silver Jubilee Medal
- Norway: Recipient of the King Olav V Commemorative Medal
- Norway: Recipient of the Medal of the 100th Anniversary of the Birth of King Olav V
- Norway: Recipient of the Royal House Centenary Medal

==== Foreign honours ====
- Brazil: Grand Cross of the Order of the Southern Cross
- Netherlands: Honorary Knight Grand Cross of the Order of the Crown
- Portugal: Grand Cross of the Order of Merit
- Sweden: Member Grand Cross of the Royal Order of the Polar Star
- Sweden: Recipient of 90th Birthday Badge Medal of King Gustav V

== Honorific eponym ==
A 540,000 km^{2} area in Antarctica is named Princess Ragnhild Coast in her honour. The Jahre Line (later Color Line) cruiseferry MS Prinsesse Ragnhild was named in her honour.
