= Ragnhild =

Ragnhild or Ragnhildr is a Nordic feminine given name, and may refer to:

== People ==
- Ragnhild (saint) (fl. 1100), Swedish saint
- Ragnhild (saint) (c. 630 – c. 680), Belgian saint
- Ragnhild Sigurdsdotter, mother of Harald I of Norway
- Ragnhild inn ríka, daughter of Eric of Jutland, wife to Harald Fairhair and mother of Eric Bloodaxe, e.g. in Heimskringla
- Ragnhild, daughter of Erling Skialgson, brother-in-law to Óláfr Tryggvason
- Ragnhild, daughter of Amlaíb mac Sitriuc of Dublin and mother of Gruffudd ap Cynan of Gwynedd
- Ragnhild (962-1002), under the Slavic name of Rogneda of Polotsk princess of Principality of Polotsk, princess consort of Rus'
- Princess Ragnhild of Norway (1930–2012)
- Ragnhild Aamodt (born 1980), Norwegian handball player
- Ragnhild Aarflot Kalland (born 1960), Norwegian politician for the Centre Party
- Ragnhild Barland (1934–2015), Norwegian politician for the Labour Party
- Ragnhild Bergheim (born 1962), Norwegian politician for the Labour Party
- Ragnhild Eriksdotter (died 984), daughter of Eric Bloodaxe
- Ragnhild Haga (born 1991), Norwegian cross-country skier
- Hildr Hrólfsdóttir (Ragnhildr Hrólfsdóttir), daughter of Hrólfr nefja and wife of Rognvald Eysteinsson
- Ragnhildur Steinunn Jónsdóttir (born 1981), Icelandic television personality
- Ragnhild Adelheid Lothe (born 1958), Norwegian microbiologist and cancer researcher
- Ragnhild Michelsen (1911–2000), Norwegian actress
- Ragnhild Mowinckel (born 1992), Norwegian alpine skier
- Ragnhild Sigurdsdotter, daughter of Sigurd Hart, identified as the mother of Harald I of Norway in the Ragnarssona þáttr
- Ragnhild Sollund, Norwegian professor and author
- Ragnhildis Olafsdottir (fl. 1140), daughter of Óláfr Guðrøðarson and wife of Somerled

== Fictional characters ==
- Ragnhild, the daughter of archaeologist Sigurd Swenson in the film Gåten Ragnarok (2013)
- Ragnhild Hansen, one of the children stolen by the witches in The Witches (novel)

== Variants ==
- Diminutives: Ragna

(In other languages)

- Danish: Ragnhild
- Germanic: Raganhildis, Raginhilt, Ragnohildis, Reginhilda, Reinhild, Reinhilde
- Irish: Raghnailt
- Icelandic: Ragnhildur
- Old Norse: Ragnhildr
- Scottish: Raghnaid
- Spanish: Reinelda
- Swedish: Ragnhild

== See also ==
- Glavendrup stone, a runestone on the island of Funen in Denmark, created for one Ragnhild
- Tryggevælde Runestone, a runestone on which Ragnhildr is called sister of Ulf
- Uppland Runic Inscription 540, which mentions one Ragnhild
