= Lorentzen family =

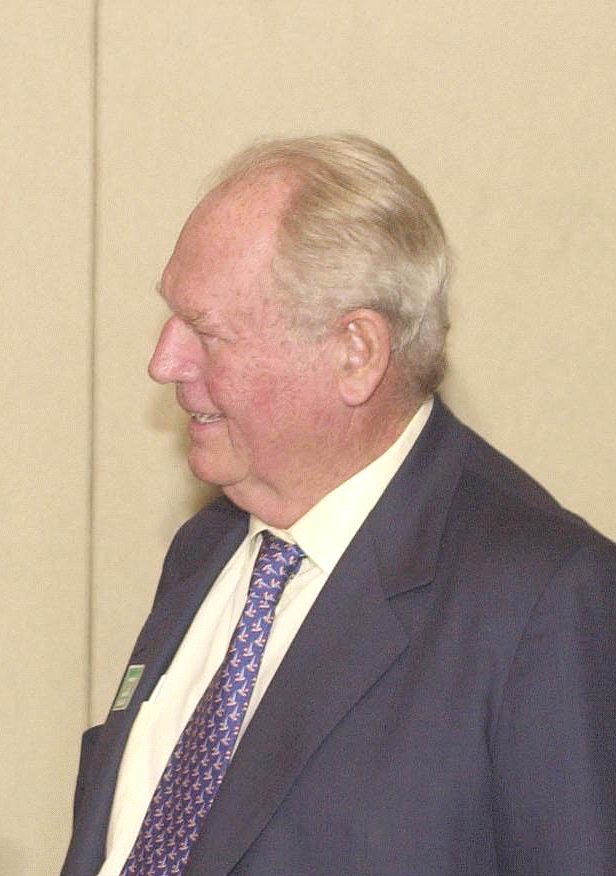
Erling Lorentzen, industrialist

Lorentzen is a Norwegian family of Danish ancestry whose members have been notable as shipping magnates and industrialists over several centuries. The industrialist Erling Lorentzen was married to Princess Ragnhild of Norway (known as Princess Ragnhild, Mrs. Lorentzen after her marriage), the eldest daughter of King Olav V of Norway. Lorentzen is a common patronymic in Denmark and Norway, and the family should not be confused with unrelated families with the same name.

== History ==
The Lorentzen family or Bie-Lorentzen is a Norwegian family of Danish origin. Several members have been noted as shipping magnates and industrialists. Among its members are shipowner Erik Finn Lorentzen and industrialist Erling Lorentzen, who was married to Princess Ragnhild of Norway (known as Princess Ragnhild, Mrs. Lorentzen after her marriage), the eldest daughter of King Olav V of Norway.

The family is descended from Hans Zachariassen (died ca. 1643), who was a merchant in Skælskør in Denmark. His son, customs official Hans Hanssøn Skielschøer (1636–1700), settled in Norway, and was the father of merchant in Holmestrand Lorentz Hanssøn (1668–1723). Two branches of the family are descended from his sons, the shipowners Ole Lorentzen (1699–1737) and Jørgen Lorentzen (1709–1752).

A branch of the family uses the double surname Bie-Lorentzen, with or without a hyphen. Members of the Lorentzen family include:

- Hans Ludvig Lorentzen (1840–1905), shipowner in Holmestrand and Brazil
- Øivind Lorentzen (1881–1980), Norwegian shipowner
- Erik Finn Lorentzen (1921–2010), shipowner
- Erling Lorentzen (1923–2021), Norwegian-Brazilian industrialist and founder of Aracruz Celulose
- Princess Ragnhild of Norway (1930–2012), eldest child of King Olav V of Norway and Princess Märtha of Sweden
- Henriette Bie Lorentzen (1911–2001), Norwegian humanist and World War II resistance member
