= Fibria =

Brazilian paper company

Fibria Celulose S.A
- Type: Subsidiary
- Industry: Pulp
- Founded: 2009; 17 years ago
- Defunct: 2019
- Fate: Merged with Suzano Papel e Celulose
- Headquarters: São Paulo, Brazil
- Key people: Marcelo Strufaldi Castelli, (CEO)
- Products: Wood products Raw material
- Revenue: ▲US$ 3.5 billion (2017)
- Net income: ▼US$ 335.6 million (2017)
- Number of employees: 15,000
- Website: www.fibria.com.br

Fibria Celulose was a Brazilian pulp and paper company, created by a merger between Aracruz Celulose and Votorantim Celulose e Papel. The company has a production capacity exceeding six million tons of pulp and paper produced in seven factories distributed in five Brazilian states. Much of this production is exported. The company has many distributor centers around the world and five branch offices in São Paulo (Headquarters), Beijing, Csomád - Hungary, Hong Kong, Miami and Nyon, Switzerland.

Fibria participates in one joint-venture in Brazil, Veracel is the company which shares with Finnish Stora Enso.

Fibria will be able to produce additional 6.7 million tons of pulp per year, when expansion projects planned before the merger are accomplished. The company's main competitors are the Brazilian Eldorado Brasil and the Chileans CMPC and Arauco.

In 2018 the company merged with its largest rival Suzano Papel e Celulose.

== See also ==
- Votorantim Celulose e Papel
