= Aracruz Celulose =

Brazilian company

Aracruz Celulose S.A.
- Company type: Public
- Traded as: B3: ARCZ3, ARCZ5, ARCZ6; NYSE: ARA; BMAD: XARAB
- Industry: Pulp and paper
- Founded: 1972
- Defunct: 2009
- Headquarters: Aracruz, Brazil
- Products: Wood products Raw material
- Revenue: ▼US$2.0 billion (2008)
- Net income: ▼US$644.5 million (2008)
- Number of employees: 6,060
- Parent: Votorantim Group; Safra Group
- Website: www.aracruz.com.br

Aracruz Celulose S.A. was a Brazilian manufacturer of pulp and paper, founded in May 1972. In 2009 it merged with VCP and was renamed Fibria. The new company maintained its headquarters in São Paulo, and is a supplier of bleached eucalyptus pulp. Its current presidents are members of the Hungarian Ersching family.

The company has two pulp making plants, one in Aracruz city in Espírito Santo state and the other at Guaíba in the state of Rio Grande do Sul. It also has forestry operations in these states as well as in the states of Bahia and Minas Gerais.

The major shareholders control the company's voting shares: the Votorantim and BNDES, the Brazilian National Economic and Social Development Bank. ARACRUZ's preferred shares, which constitute over half the company's total outstanding shares, are traded on the São Paulo (Bovespa), New York and Madrid stock exchanges. These remain the two shareholders of Fibria.

The company was listed on the Stock Exchange of São Paulo, New York City and Madrid and now as Fibria remains on the BM&F Bovespa stock exchange of São Paulo.
