= Bodø (town) =

Town in Bodø Municipality, Norway

Bodø Bodø (Norwegian) Bådåddjo (Lule Sami) Buvvda (Pite Sami)
- Town
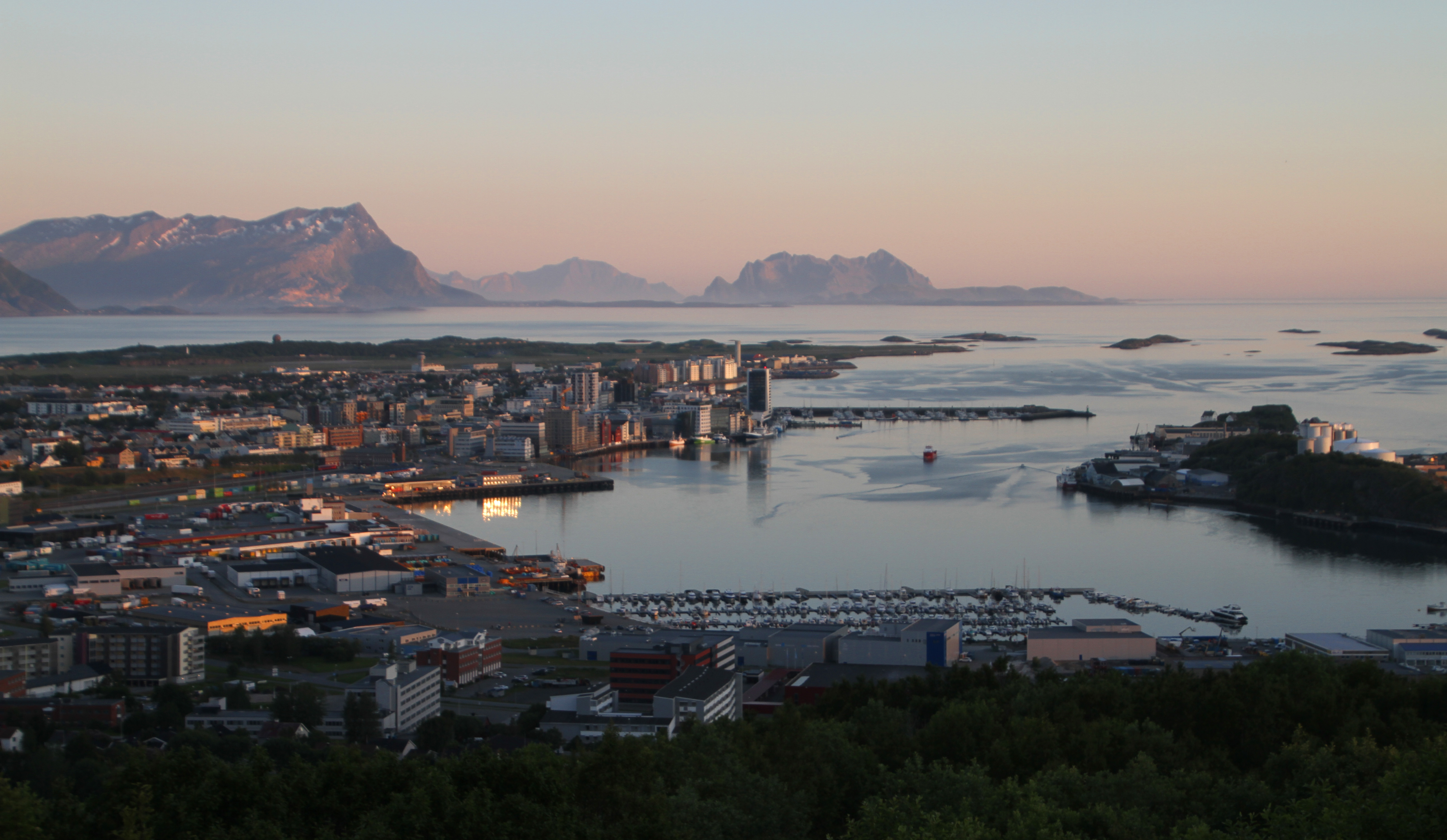
- View of the town, 2019
- Interactive map of Bodø
- Location within Nordland Location within Norway Location within Europe
- Coordinates: 67.2827°N 14.3751°E
- Country: Norway
- Region: Northern Norway
- County: Nordland
- District: Salten
- Municipality: Bodø Municipality
- Established as
- Kjøpstad: 1816

Area
  - Total: 14.91 km^{2} (5.76 sq mi)
- Elevation: 4 m (13 ft)

Population (2025)
  - Total: 43,504
  - Density: 2,873/km^{2} (7,440/sq mi)
- Demonym: Bodøværing
- Time zone: UTC+01:00 (CET)
  - Summer (DST): UTC+02:00 (CEST)
- Post Code: 8006 Bodø

Bodø (pronounced [ˈbûːdøː], ; Pite Sami: Buvvda; Lule Sami: Bådåddjo) is a town in Bodø Municipality in Nordland county, Norway. The town is the administrative centre of both the Bodø Municipality and Nordland county. It is located on the Bodø peninsula between Vestfjorden and Saltfjorden. Bodø is located just north of the Arctic Circle. It is the largest urban area and town in Nordland county and the second-largest town in Northern Norway.

The 14.91-square-kilometre (3,680-acre) town has a population of 42,831 as of 2023 and a population density of 2,873 inhabitants per square kilometre (7,440/sq mi).

Bodø was one of the European Capitals of Culture in 2024, along with Bad Ischl and Tartu.

One of Norway's most successful football clubs, FK Bodø/Glimt, is based in the town.

== History ==
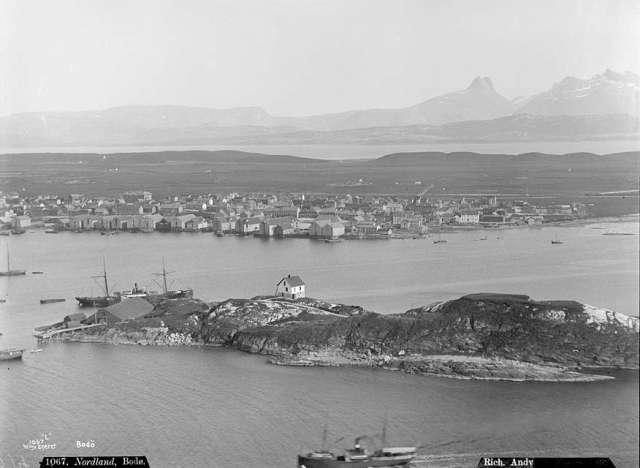
Bodø harbor 1880

The village of Bodø was granted town status as a kjøpstad in 1816 and soon after, in 1818, it was known for the Bodø affair, smuggling of contraband cargo by British merchants that later were compensated by Norway. The town of Bodø was established as a municipality on 1 January 1838 (see formannskapsdistrikt law). On 1 January 1938, a part of the neighboring Bodin Municipality (population: 559) was transferred into the town of Bodø. On 1 January 1959, another part of Bodin Municipality (population: 1,303) was transferred into the town of Bodø, expanding its size considerably. During the 1960s, there were many municipal mergers across Norway due to the work of the Schei Committee. On 1 January 1968, the town of Bodø (population: 14,252) was merged with Bodin Municipality (population: 13,323) and this created the much larger Bodø Municipality.

=== Toponymy ===
The town is named after the old Bodøgård farm (Old Norse: Boðvin) because the town was built on its land. The first element might be boði 'sunken rock' or 'skerry', and the last element is vin 'meadow' or 'pasture'. The last element may have been misunderstood as øy 'island' (and written with the Danish form ø).

== Climate ==
Bodø features Humid continental climate (Köppen: Dfb) using 0C as the winter threshold or a temperate oceanic climate if using -3C as the winter threshold as in the original Köppen climate classification system. In the 1961-1990 period it featured a borderline subpolar oceanic/subarctic climate. The weather in Bodø depends on weather pattern; long lasting weather patterns with Atlantic lows bringing rain and overcast can occur in all seasons, but so can sunny weather with Highs over Northern Scandiniava/Western Russia. Located on a peninsula in the Norwegian Sea, Bodø has potential for strong winds both from the west and east. The "midnight sun" is above the horizon from 1 June to 14 July (44 days), and the period with continuous daylight lasts a bit longer.

The following records are from the airport. The all-time low −18.5 °C (−1.3 °F) was recorded in February 1966, which was the coldest month on record with a mean of −8.9 °C (16.0 °F). The all-time high 30.7 °C (87.3 °F) was set in July 2019, while July 2014 was the warmest month with a 24-hr mean 17.3 °C (63.1 °F) and average daily high 21.6 °C (70.9 °F). The warmest night recorded was June 29, 1972 with overnight low 21.7 °C (71.1 °F). The average date for the first overnight freeze (below 0 °C (32.0 °F)) in autumn is October 12 (1981–2010 average). The driest month on record was January 2014 with no precipitation at all, while the wettest was September 2009 with 293 mm.

Recent decades have seen warming, and there has been no overnight air frost in June since 1981. With its location on the Arctic Circle the city features one of the largest latitudinal temperature anomalies on Earth. Data in table below is from Bodø VI, approximately 1 km from the town center.

Climate data for Bodø VI 1991–2020 (16 m, extremes 1953–2022 from Bodø Airport, sunhours 1991–2005 from Bodø Airport)
Month	Jan	Feb	Mar	Apr	May	Jun	Jul	Aug	Sep	Oct	Nov	Dec	Year
Record high °C (°F)	11.8 (53.2)	9.6 (49.3)	11.8 (53.2)	18.2 (64.8)	24.5 (76.1)	29.9 (85.8)	30.7 (87.3)	28.2 (82.8)	24.3 (75.7)	18.8 (65.8)	16.2 (61.2)	10.1 (50.2)	30.7 (87.3)
Mean daily maximum °C (°F)	1.7 (35.1)	1.3 (34.3)	2.5 (36.5)	6.0 (42.8)	10.2 (50.4)	13.8 (56.8)	16.9 (62.4)	16.3 (61.3)	12.4 (54.3)	7.7 (45.9)	4.6 (40.3)	2.9 (37.2)	8.0 (46.4)
Daily mean °C (°F)	−0.5 (31.1)	−1.0 (30.2)	0.2 (32.4)	3.4 (38.1)	7.3 (45.1)	10.8 (51.4)	13.6 (56.5)	13.2 (55.8)	10.1 (50.2)	5.6 (42.1)	2.6 (36.7)	0.8 (33.4)	5.5 (41.9)
Mean daily minimum °C (°F)	−2.8 (27.0)	−3.2 (26.2)	−2.0 (28.4)	0.9 (33.6)	4.6 (40.3)	8.1 (46.6)	10.8 (51.4)	10.6 (51.1)	7.2 (45.0)	3.5 (38.3)	0.5 (32.9)	−1.4 (29.5)	3.1 (37.5)
Record low °C (°F)	−17.1 (1.2)	−18.5 (−1.3)	−15.6 (3.9)	−10.3 (13.5)	−3.9 (25.0)	−1.2 (29.8)	2.8 (37.0)	1.7 (35.1)	−2.8 (27.0)	−8.2 (17.2)	−12.0 (10.4)	−16.7 (1.9)	−18.5 (−1.3)
Average precipitation mm (inches)	103.6 (4.08)	78.5 (3.09)	81.4 (3.20)	71.1 (2.80)	64.8 (2.55)	65.2 (2.57)	65.7 (2.59)	84.7 (3.33)	128.7 (5.07)	138.3 (5.44)	116.4 (4.58)	119.0 (4.69)	1,117.4 (43.99)
Average precipitation days (≥ 1.0 mm)	15	14	14	12	12	11	10	12	15	17	15	17	164
Mean monthly sunshine hours	8.1	46.6	106.1	179.7	210.3	219.6	192.7	151.7	120.8	69.8	20.1	0.4	1,325.9
Source 1: Norwegian Meteorological Institute (monthly records)
Source 2: NOAA

Earlier weather data for Bodø, which then had a subpolar Oceanic Climate (Cfc).

Climate data for Bodø Airport (11 m; temps 1981–2010, sun 2000–2009; extremes 1953–present)
Month	Jan	Feb	Mar	Apr	May	Jun	Jul	Aug	Sep	Oct	Nov	Dec	Year
Record high °C (°F)	11.8 (53.2)	9.6 (49.3)	11.6 (52.9)	17.4 (63.3)	24.5 (76.1)	28.8 (83.8)	30.4 (86.7)	28.2 (82.8)	24.3 (75.7)	18.8 (65.8)	16.2 (61.2)	10.1 (50.2)	30.4 (86.7)
Mean daily maximum °C (°F)	1.2 (34.2)	0.9 (33.6)	2.2 (36.0)	5.7 (42.3)	10.2 (50.4)	13.4 (56.1)	16.2 (61.2)	15.7 (60.3)	12.2 (54.0)	7.6 (45.7)	3.9 (39.0)	2.0 (35.6)	7.6 (45.7)
Daily mean °C (°F)	−1.1 (30.0)	−1.3 (29.7)	−0.1 (31.8)	3.2 (37.8)	7.4 (45.3)	10.6 (51.1)	13.3 (55.9)	12.9 (55.2)	9.7 (49.5)	5.6 (42.1)	1.8 (35.2)	−0.2 (31.6)	5.2 (41.4)
Mean daily minimum °C (°F)	−3.4 (25.9)	−3.6 (25.5)	−2.4 (27.7)	0.6 (33.1)	4.5 (40.1)	7.7 (45.9)	10.3 (50.5)	10.0 (50.0)	7.2 (45.0)	3.4 (38.1)	−0.3 (31.5)	−2.5 (27.5)	2.6 (36.7)
Record low °C (°F)	−17.1 (1.2)	−18.5 (−1.3)	−15.6 (3.9)	−10.3 (13.5)	−3.9 (25.0)	−1.2 (29.8)	2.8 (37.0)	1.7 (35.1)	−2.8 (27.0)	−8.2 (17.2)	−12.0 (10.4)	−16.7 (1.9)	−18.5 (−1.3)
Average precipitation mm (inches)	99.3 (3.91)	72.7 (2.86)	66.8 (2.63)	62.0 (2.44)	62.7 (2.47)	59.3 (2.33)	77.7 (3.06)	88.8 (3.50)	127.6 (5.02)	136.8 (5.39)	107.0 (4.21)	110.8 (4.36)	1,070.9 (42.16)
Average precipitation days	15.6	13.7	11.7	11.5	11.4	10.8	11.8	12.5	15.4	17.6	14.8	16.5	163.3
Mean monthly sunshine hours	8.1	43.0	114.0	158.7	218.8	220.7	172.0	166.5	98.4	54.3	16.3	0.4	1,271.2
Source 1:
Source 2:

== Institutions ==
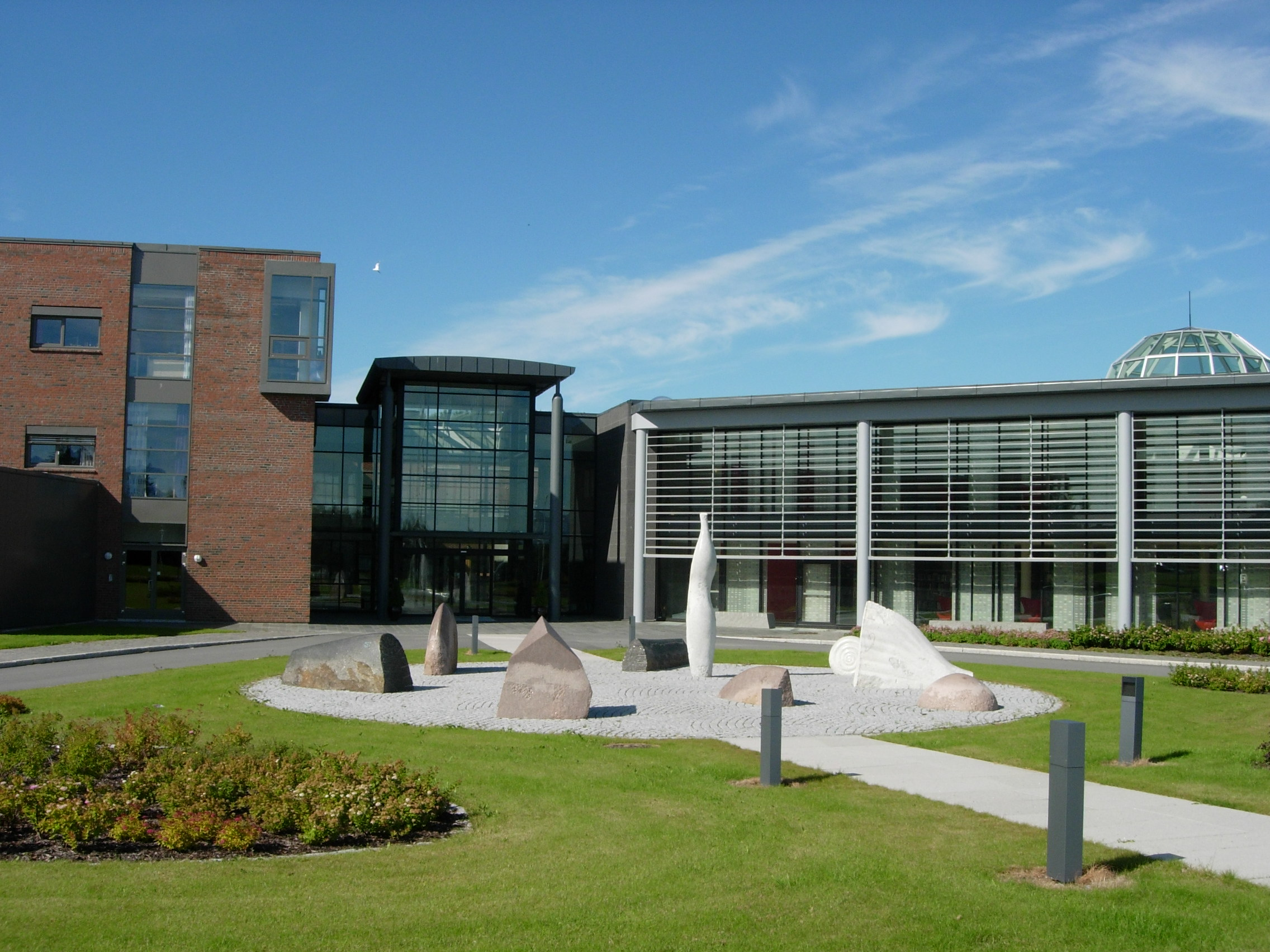
Nord University

The main campus of Nord University is located 10 kilometres (6.2 mi) outside the city centre. Twelve thousand undergraduate and graduate students study at the university.

Bodø is the location of the only police academy in Norway outside Oslo. The Norwegian Civil Aviation Authority is situated in Bodø, as is the Joint Rescue Coordination Centre of Northern Norway. The Norwegian Armed Forces headquarters for North Norway is located at Reitan, east of the city. The main hospital is Nordland Hospital Trust, which has local, regional, and national areas of responsibility. SB Nordlandsbuss has its headquarters in Bodø, as does Bodø Energi and Nordlandsbanken.

The largest shopping centre in Nordland, City Nord, is located in the town of Bodø.

== Transportation ==
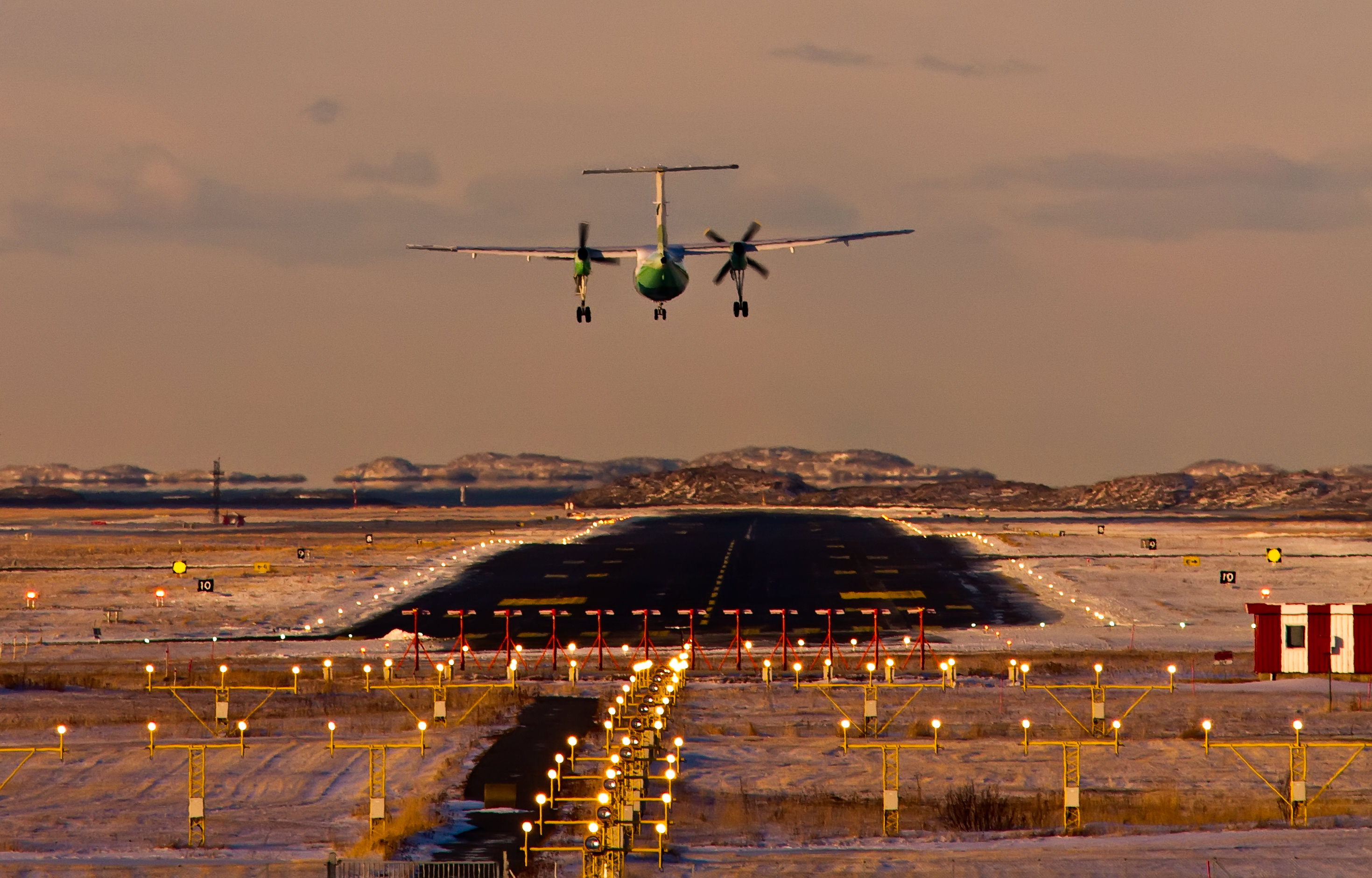
Widerøe Dash 8 landing at Bodø

=== Rail transport ===
Bodø Station serves as the northern terminus of the Nordland Line that runs south to Trondheim, where it connects to the rest of the Norwegian rail network. It is not the northernmost station though, with Tverrlandet Station being the northernmost station of the Nordland Line and Narvik Station, terminal of the Ofoten Line, being the northernmost station in the whole of Norway. The Ofoten Line, however, does not have a connection to the rest of Norway's railway network, thus making Bodø also the northern terminus of the central Norwegian railway system.

If F7 and R75 are counted together, there are 10 daily services to Fauske, 7 daily services to Rognan, 4 daily services to Mosjøen, and 2 daily services to Trondheim on a typical weekday. On weekends, there are only 3 daily services of the F7 and one daily service of the R75.

=== Bus traffic ===
Bodø is served by several bus lines to various destinations. Inside Bodø, there is a bus network with 4 lines, serving as public transport in Bodø, and 4 long-distance bus lines connecting to different parts of the country. Notable is line 100, which connects to Narvik, where it is possible to change onto trains of the Ofoten line towards Sweden at Narvik Station.

=== Ferries ===
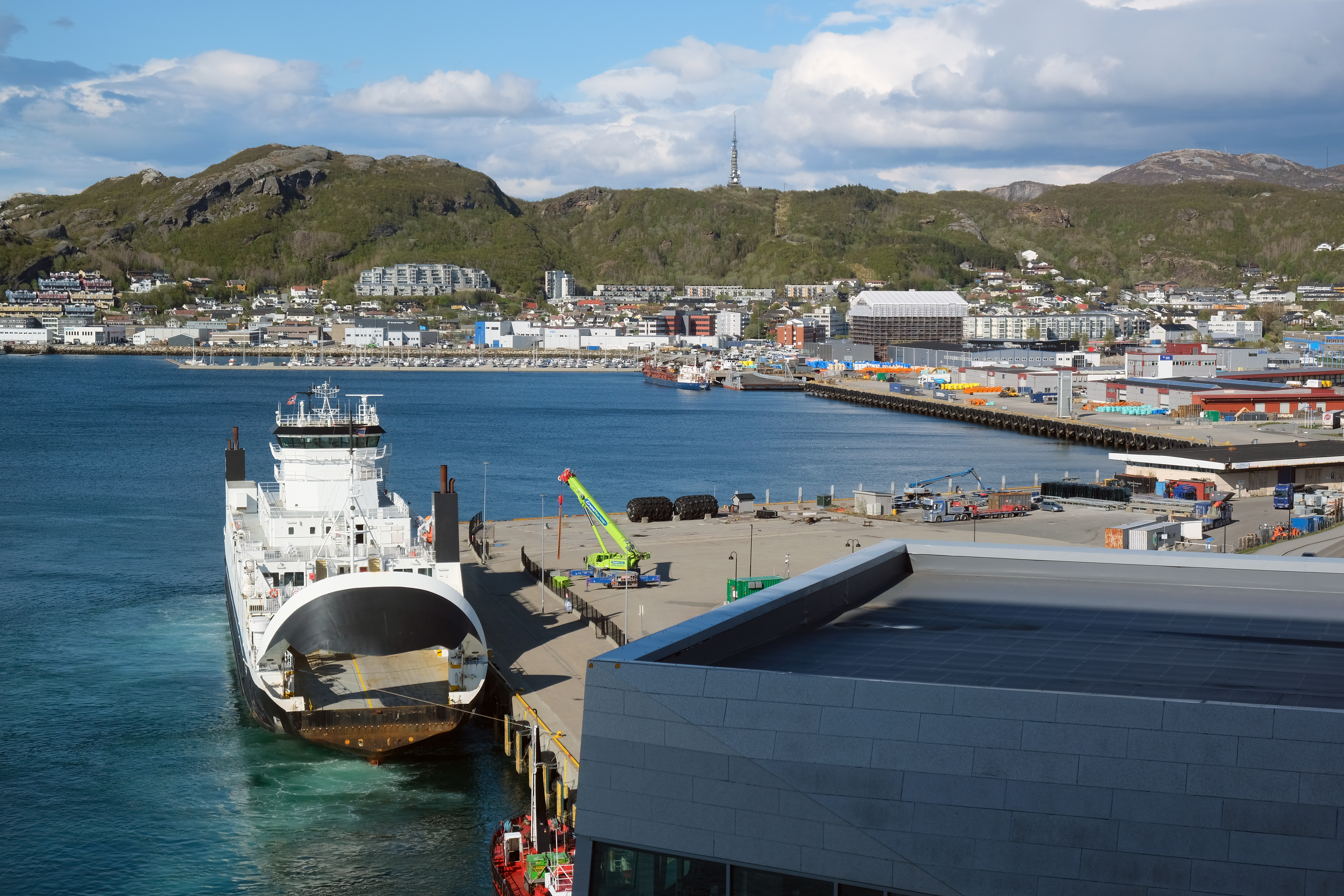
Port of Bodø

Bodø is an important ferry port, connecting to several other parts of Norway. It is serviced by the Ferry Bodø – Røst – Værøya – Moskenes by operator Torghatten Nord. Nordland County Municipality operates the Hurtigbåt services from the city center terminal. Hurtigbåt services go to Sandnessjøen, Svolvær, Væran, and Gildeskål

Additionally, Bodø is a stop on the renowned Hurtigruten (Kystruten Bergen-Kirkenes) Norwegian coastal ferry line and sees daily services towards Bergen and Kirkenes by operator Hurtigruten or Havila Kystruten, who jointly run the Kystruten service between Bergen and Kirkenes.

=== Air Travel ===
Bodø Airport lies just south of the city centre and was opened in 1952. The airport is run by Avinor. It served 1,733,330 passengers in 2015 and is the site of Bodø Air Traffic Control Center. It is served regularly by SAS (Scandinavian Airlines), Norwegian Air Shuttle and Widerøe. The airline Widerøe has its head office in Bodø.

== Culture ==
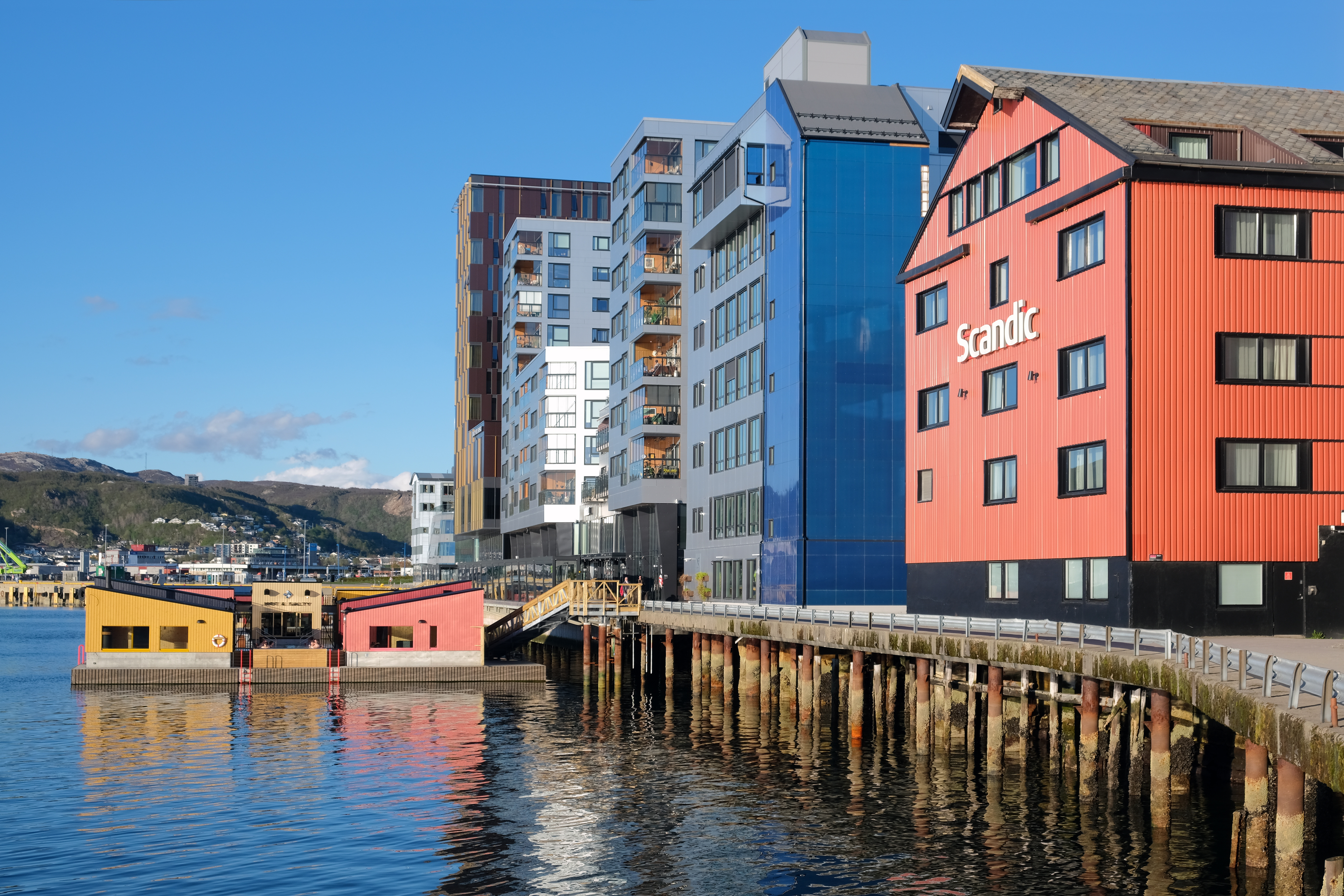
Ramsalt, Bodø

Bodø's local newspaper is the Avisa Nordland.

The Norwegian Aviation Museum and Salten Museum are located in Bodø. Salten Museum has four exhibitions: The Lofoten Fisheries, a Sami exhibit, a Viking treasure, and an exhibition about Bodø's history from 1816 to 2000.

The Bodø Cathedral was built in 1956, representing post-war architecture, whereas the Bodin Church just outside the city centre dates from the 13th century, representing a typical medieval stone church. Other churches in the town include Hunstad Church and Rønvik Church.

The new cultural centre "Stormen" (the tempest) was opened in 2014. It contains a library, a concert hall and theater. The building is designed by Daniel Rosbottom and David Howarth. Bodø is host to the cultural festivals Nordland Musikkfestuke and Parkenfestivalen every summer, as well as the free and volunteer based Bodø Hardcore Festival in early winter.

Fram Kino was the first cinema in Norway. It was started in the year 1908.

== Sports ==
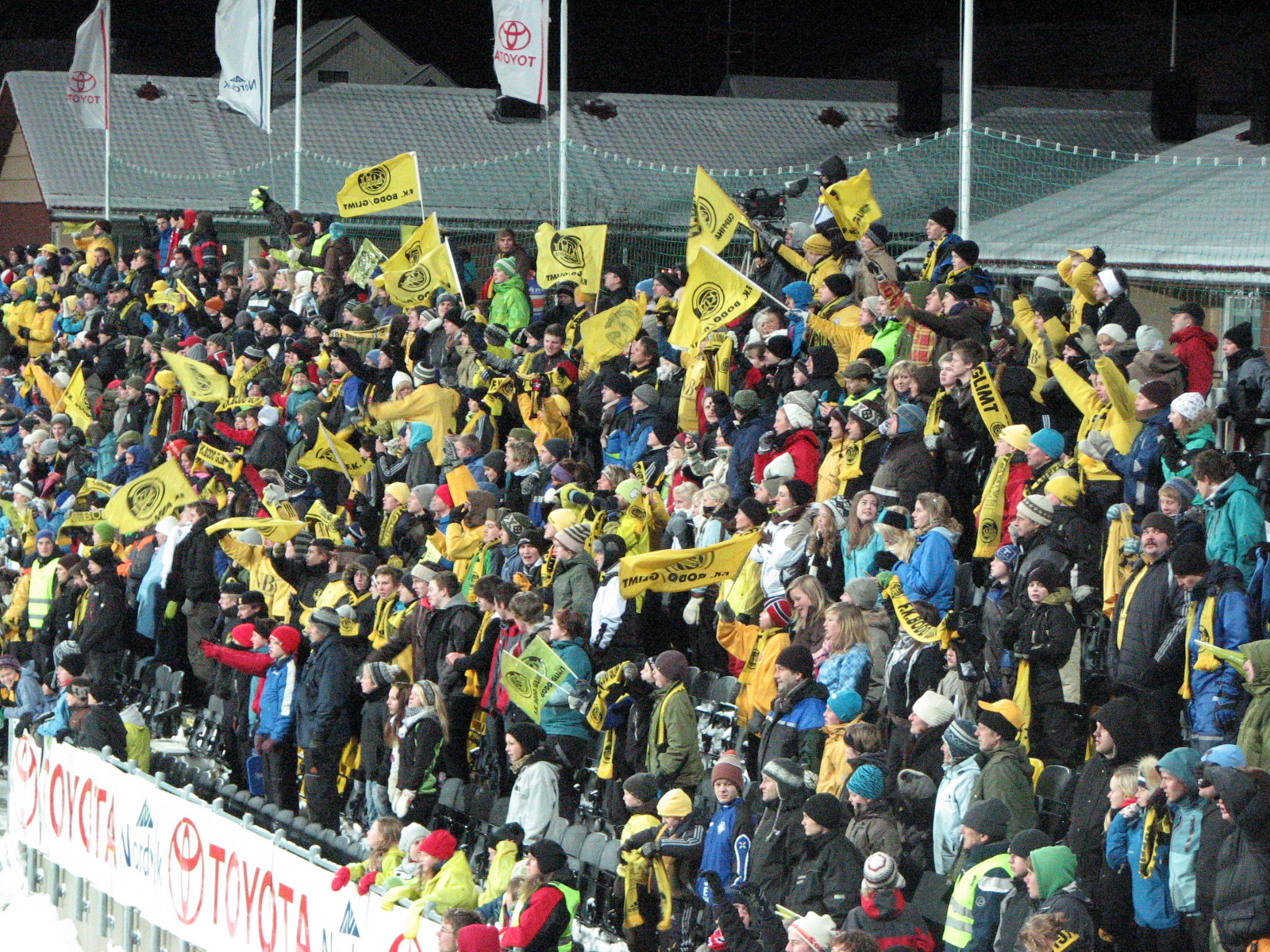
Glimt supporters on Aspmyra Stadion

Bodø's main professional team is the football club Bodø/Glimt, playing in Eliteserien, the top division of football in Norway.

In addition to Bodø/Glimt, Bodø has had several teams at national top level, including Grand Bodø (women's football), Junkeren (women's handball) and Bodø HK (men's handball).

The most well-known sporting arena in Bodø is Aspmyra Stadion, which in addition to being the home of Bodø/Glimt has hosted one international match. Also, the multi-purpose indoor Bodø Spektrum, contains full-size football and handball courts, as well as several swimming and bathing facilities.

The town is also home of Bodø Barbarians, a leading rugby league team.

== Notable people ==
=== Public service ===
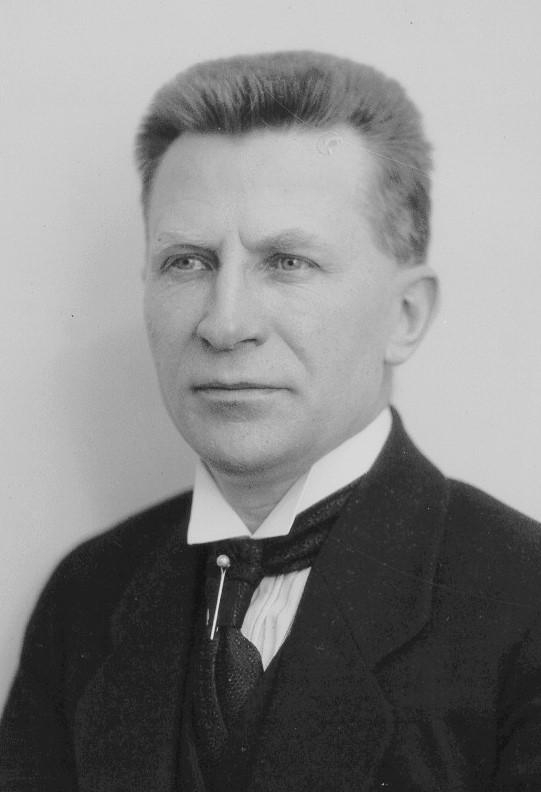
Ole Mikal Kobbe, 1925

- Paul Steenstrup Koht (1844–1892), an educator and politician with a penchant for Greek and Roman poetry
- Christian Albrecht Jakhelln (1863–1945), a businessperson and politician who served as Mayor
- Johannes J. Johannessen (1872–1915), a United States Navy sailor who received the Medal of Honor
- Ole Mikal Kobbe (1881–1955), a Norwegian military officer and politician
- Sigmund Olaf Plytt Mowinckel (1884 in Kjerringøy – 1965), a professor, theologian, and biblical scholar
- Tore Gjelsvik (1916–2006), a geologist, polar explorer, and a role in the Norwegian resistance
- Jon Tørset (born 1940), a Norwegian politician who served as county mayor of Nordland from 1999–2007
- Tor Berger Jørgensen (born 1945), the Bishop of the Diocese of Sør-Hålogaland from 2006–2015
- Ann-Helen Fjeldstad Jusnes (born 1956), the Bishop of the Diocese of Sør-Hålogaland since 2016
- Torild Skogsholm (born 1959), a politician and director of the Oslo tram company Oslo Sporvognsdrift
- Marie Simonsen (born 1962), a Norwegian journalist and political editor of Dagbladet
- Vidar Helgesen (born 1968), a Norwegian diplomat and politician
- Tom Cato Karlsen (born 1974), a politician, anesthesiologist, and County Governor of Nordland

=== The arts ===
- Adelsteen Normann (1848–1918), a Norwegian painter who worked in Berlin
- Håkon Evjenth (1894–1951), a jurist, non-fiction writer, short-story writer, and children's writer
- Asbjørn Toms (1915–1990), a Norwegian actor, stage director and playwright
- Jonas Fjeld (born 1952), a Norwegian singer, songwriter, and guitarist
- Jan Gunnar Hoff (born 1958), a Norwegian jazz pianist, composer, arranger, and professor
- Morten Abel (born 1962), a Norwegian pop artist
- Per Sundnes (born 1966), a Norwegian journalist and talk show host
- Susanne Lundeng (born 1969), a Norwegian traditional folk musician, fiddler, and composer
- Endre Lund Eriksen (born 1977), a Norwegian author and politician
- Caroline Ailin (born 1989), a Norwegian singer and songwriter based in London
- Tor Kvarv (1953–2025), artist

=== Sport ===
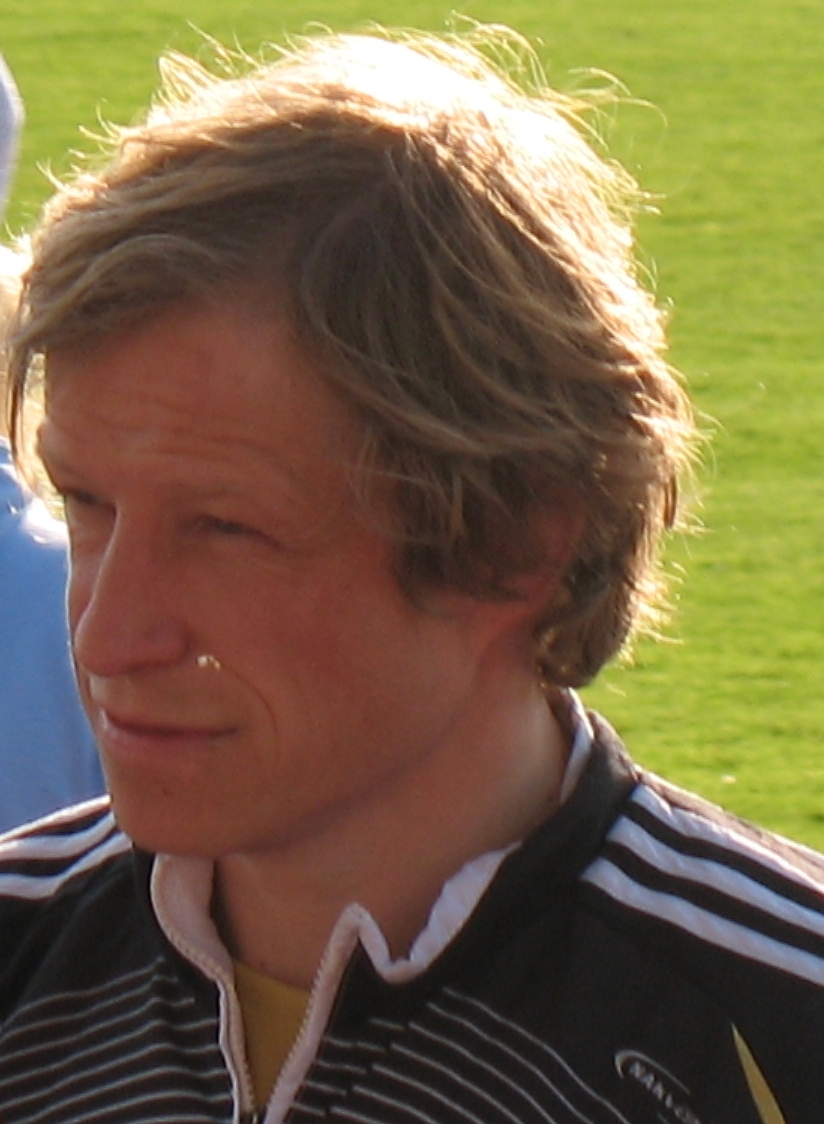
Ørjan Berg, 2006

- Christian Berg (born 1978), a retired Norwegian footballer with over 320 club appearances
- Harald Berg (born 1941), a former footballer with 43 caps for Norway
- Ørjan Berg (born 1968), a former Norwegian footballer with 383 club appearances and 19 caps for Norway
- Runar Berg (born 1970), a retired Norwegian footballer with 450 club appearances and 5 caps for Norway
- Marianne Dahlmo (born 1965), a former cross-country skier, team silver medallist at the 1988 Winter Olympics
- Ann Cathrin Eriksen (born 1971), a former team handball player, team bronze medallist at the 2000 Summer Olympics
- Jens Petter Hauge (born 1999), a footballer who currently plays for FK Bodø/Glimt
- Tor Helness (born 1957), a professional bridge player, now living in Monaco
- Mini Jakobsen (born 1965 in Gravdal), a former footballer with 372 club appearances and 65 caps for Norway
- Anders Konradsen (born 1990), a Norwegian footballer with over 270 club appearances and 8 caps for Norway
- Kjell Søbak (born 1957), a former biathlete who was team silver medallist at the 1984 Winter Olympics
- Alexander Tettey (born 1986), a Norwegian footballer with 380 club appearances and 34 caps for Norway
- Morten Thoresen (born 1997), a Norwegian Greco-Roman wrestler who was gold medallist at the 2020 European Wrestling Championships
- Martin Wiig (born 1983), a retired Norwegian footballer with 350 club appearances
- Vetle Eck Aga (born 1993), a Norwegian handball player for Kolstad Håndball and Norwegian national handball team

== See also ==
- List of towns and cities in Norway
