= Lutheran Church in Great Britain =

- Classification: Christian
- Orientation: Protestant
- Scripture: Christian Bible
- Theology: Lutheranism
- Polity: Episcopal
- Bishop: Paulina Hlawiczka-Trotman
- Associations: Lutheran World Federation; Lutheran Council of Great Britain; Porvoo Communion
- Region: Great Britain
- Origin: 1961 (as the United Lutheran Synod)
- Congregations: 11
- Official website: https://www.lcigb.org

The Lutheran Church in Great Britain (LCiGB) is a small Protestant Christian church in the United Kingdom. The LCiGB is a member church of the Lutheran World Federation and of The Lutheran Council of Great Britain, the umbrella organisation for several Lutheran churches in Great Britain, many of which are chaplaincies or congregations that are closely related to Lutheran churches in other countries. The LCiGB is also a member of the Porvoo Communion of Anglican and Lutheran churches in Europe. It is, in common with many Lutheran churches, led by a bishop and a council of lay members and clergy elected at its annual synod. Tor Berger Jørgensen, former bishop of the Diocese of Sør-Hålogaland in the Church of Norway, was received as the fourth bishop of the LCiGB on 6 October 2019.

== History ==
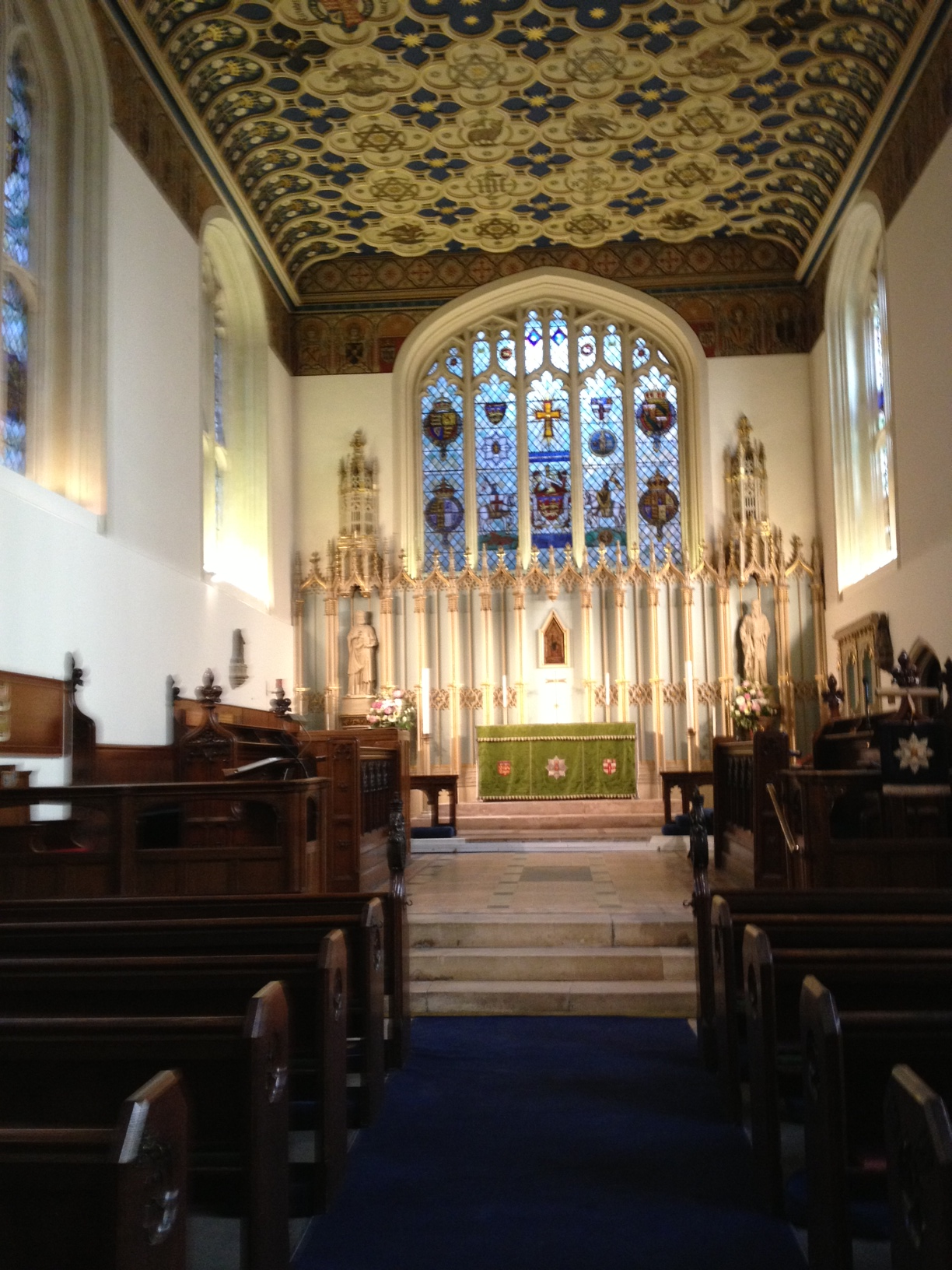
Interior of The Savoy Chapel

The English Reformation did not follow the Lutheran pattern, but was instead largely influenced by ideas stemming from the Reformation in Switzerland and its parallel in Strasbourg. It is well known that Henry VIII did not favour the Lutheran cause. However, there were some English adherents of Lutheranism. A group of theologians at the University of Cambridge, which met at the White Horse tavern from the mid-1520s and became known as 'Little Germany', was influential. Its members included Robert Barnes, Hugh Latimer, John Frith and Thomas Bilney. Archbishop Thomas Cranmer was initially influenced by Lutheran theology. He visited Andreas Osiander in Nuremberg in 1532. The First Prayer Book of Edward VI (1549) was arguably Lutheran in content. However, the Second Prayer Book of Edward VI (1552) was published along Swiss Reformed lines and the Church of England became part of the Reformed tradition in Protestantism. The first Lutherans living in Britain after the Reformation were therefore not local people, but largely foreign merchants.

The first officially sanctioned Lutheran congregation, organised in 1669, received a royal charter in 1672 from Charles II. This charter gave the mostly German congregation the site of the former church of Holy Trinity the Less in the City of London which was destroyed in 1666 in the Great Fire of London. The foundation stone of the new Holy Trinity Church was laid on 21 November 1672 and the completed building was dedicated one year later on Advent Sunday 1673. The church was usually known as the Hamburg Lutheran Church because many of its original members were sea merchants associated with the Hanseatic League in Germany. The church survived until 1871 when it was demolished to make way for Mansion House underground station. In addition, The Queen's Chapel of the Savoy, a royal peculiar and thus not subject to a bishop's jurisdiction, hosted the German congregation of Westminster. It was granted royal permission to worship in the Savoy Chapel when it separated from Holy Trinity the Less. The new congregation's first pastor, Irenaeus Crusius (previously an associate at Holy Trinity the Less), dedicated the congregation on the 19th Sunday after Trinity 1694 as the Marienkirche or in English as the German Church of St Mary-le-Savoy. Both congregations still survive.

In the English-speaking lineage, Holy Trinity the Less was succeeded by St Anne's Lutheran Church which worshipped at the Anglican church of St Anne and St Agnes from 1966 to 2013 in the City of London. The German-speaking congregation now meets in Cambridge. St Anne's now worships at the Anglican church of St Mary-at-Hill, also located in the city. The German Church of St Mary-le-Savoy now exists as part of the united German congregation of St Mary and St George. The congregation now meets in the chapel within the International Lutheran Student Centre in Bloomsbury, London.

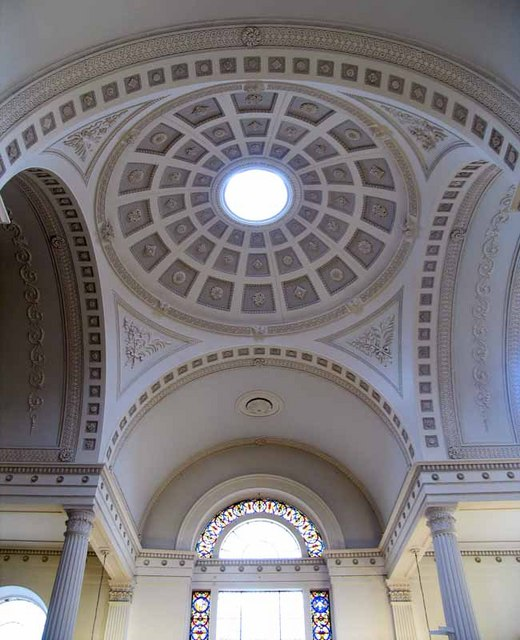
Dome of St Mary at Hill

All Lutheran congregations in Britain were originally ethnic churches that worshipped in various national languages and most that remain still function on ethnic-linguistic lines. The LCiGB was founded as the English-speaking United Lutheran Synod in April 1961 by four congregations in London, High Wycombe, Corby, and Hothorpe Hall. These congregations were mainly founded by European immigrants, but now worshipped in English. In 1978, it changed its name to the Lutheran Church in Great Britain – United Synod. In 1988, the words 'United Synod' were dropped from its name. From 1961 to 2000, the LCiGB was led by a dean who had episcopal functions, but was not a consecrated bishop. In 2000, it adopted a fully episcopal polity when Walter Jagucki was consecrated as the first Bishop. In 2013, the LCiGB was accepted by the presiding bishops of the Porvoo Communion for full membership, and it was admitted into the Communion when bishop Martin Lind signed the Porvoo Declaration in September 2014.

In 2024 Paulina Hlawiczka-Trotman was ordained as the only bishop of the Lutheran Church in Great Britain; as she was from Poland, this made her the world's first female Polish Protestant bishop.

== Congregations ==
There are 11 congregations in the LCiGB as well as three chaplaincies. Although the LCiGB originated as an English-speaking church, it now holds services in several languages. Services are conducted in English (in Birmingham, Bradford, Corby, Harrogate, Leeds, Liverpool, London, Manchester, and Nottingham), Chinese (in London), Polish (in Bradford, Edinburgh, High Wycombe, London, Manchester, and Reading), Swahili (in London), with a Nordic congregation in Liverpool worshipping in Swedish, Norwegian and occasionally Finnish and Danish. In addition, the LCiGB is active in university chaplaincies at Birmingham University (University of Birmingham Chaplaincy), Leeds University, and Leicester University (University of Leicester Chaplaincy).

== Bishops ==
- Walter Jagucki, 2000–2009
- Jāna Jēruma-Grīnberga, 2009–2013
- Martin Lind, 2014–2019
- Tor Berger Jørgensen, 2019–2024
- Paulina Hlawiczka-Trotman, from 2024

== See also ==
- Evangelical Lutheran Church of England
- Lutheran Church in Ireland
- Nordic churches in London
