= Bodø Cathedral =

Church in Nordland, Norway

- Bodø domkirke
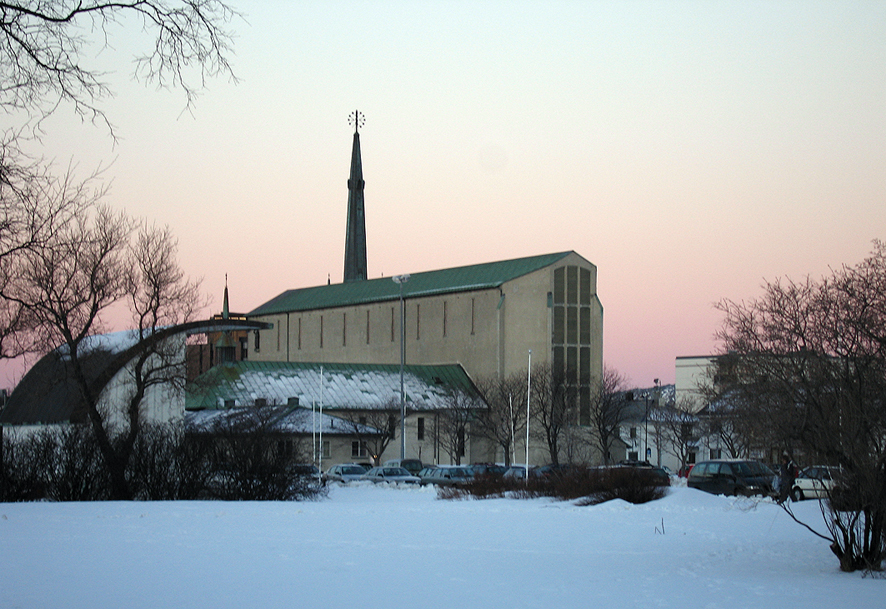
- View of the church
- Bodø Cathedral
- 67.2823163°N 14.38186526°E
- Location: Bodø Municipality, Nordland
- Country: Norway
- Denomination: Church of Norway
- Churchmanship: Evangelical Lutheran

History
- Status: Cathedral
- Founded: 1888
- Consecrated: 1956

Architecture
- Functional status: Active
- Architect(s): Gudolf Blakstad and Herman Munthe-Kaas
- Architectural type: Long church
- Completed: 1956 (70 years ago)

Specifications
- Capacity: 890
- Materials: Concrete

Administration
- Diocese: Sør-Hålogaland
- Deanery: Bodø domprosti
- Parish: Bodø domkirke

Clergy
- Bishop: Ann-Helen Fjeldstad Jusnes
- Norwegian Cultural Heritage Site
- Type: Church
- Status: Listed
- ID: 83920

Bodø Cathedral (Norwegian: Bodø domkirke) is a cathedral of the Church of Norway in Bodø Municipality in Nordland county, Norway. It is located in the town of Bodø. It is the church for the Bodø domkirke parish which is also the seat of the Bodø domprosti (deanery) and the seat of the Bishop of the Diocese of Sør-Hålogaland. The concrete church was built in a long church basilica style in 1956 using plans drawn up by the architects Gudolf Blakstad and Herman Munthe-Kaas. The church seats about 850 people.

== History ==
The town of Bodø was established in 1816, but it did not receive its own church for quite some time. The nearby Bodin Church served the town and surrounding area for quite some time before a church was built in the town. Construction on a new church in the town of Bodø began in 1887 and it was consecrated on 6 January 1888. The building was designed by the architect Jacob Wilhelm Nordan. It was a yellow, wooden, neo-Gothic long church with a tower on the west end.

The church was destroyed on 27 May 1940 when the whole city center of Bodø was bombed during World War II. In 1946, an architectural competition was held for the design of a new church, which was won by the architects Gudolf Blakstad and Herman Munthe-Kaas. The foundation stone was laid in 1954, and the new church which was consecrated by Bishop Wollert Krohn-Hansen on 14 October 1956. By the time it was completed, it had become the cathedral for the new Diocese of Sør-Hålogaland, which was established in 1952.

Bodø Cathedral is built of concrete and has a basilica design. The church has an external sculpture depicting Petter Dass made by Kristoffer Leirdal. The sanctuary seats about 890 people. Over the altar in the east wall there is a 12-metre (39 ft) high stained-glass window designed by Åge Storstein and constructed by Borgar Hauglid. The church has a 36-metre (118 ft) tall free-standing clock tower that contains three bells. There is also a memorial to those who died from Bodø during the World War II. The inscription reads «Til de fra Bodø, som gav sitt liv for Norge under krig og okkupasjon 1940–1945. Ingen nevnt, ingen glemt.» which means "In memory of those from Bodø, who gave their lives for Norway during war and occupation 1940–1945. No one named, no one forgotten."

== Picture gallery ==
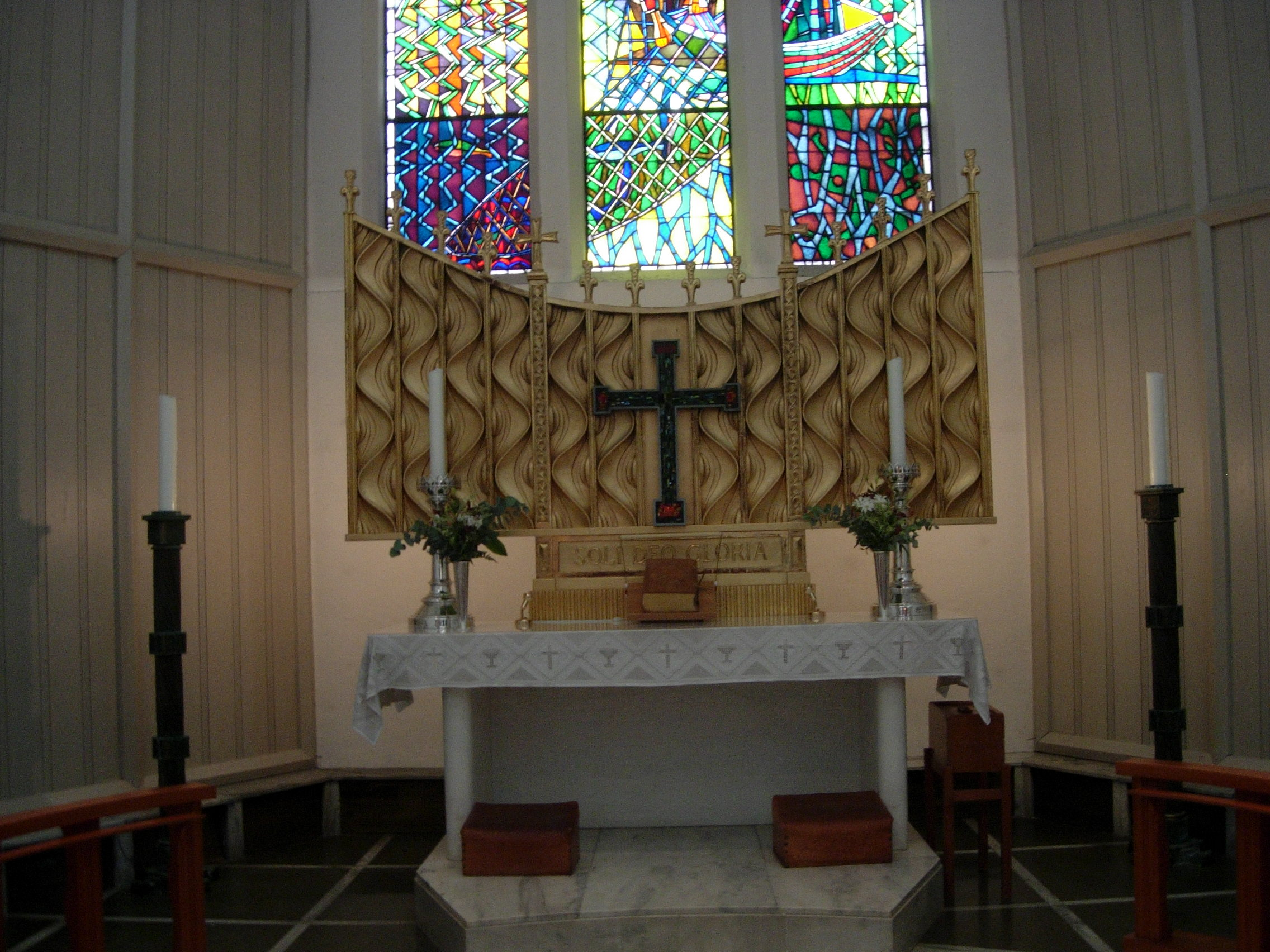
Altar

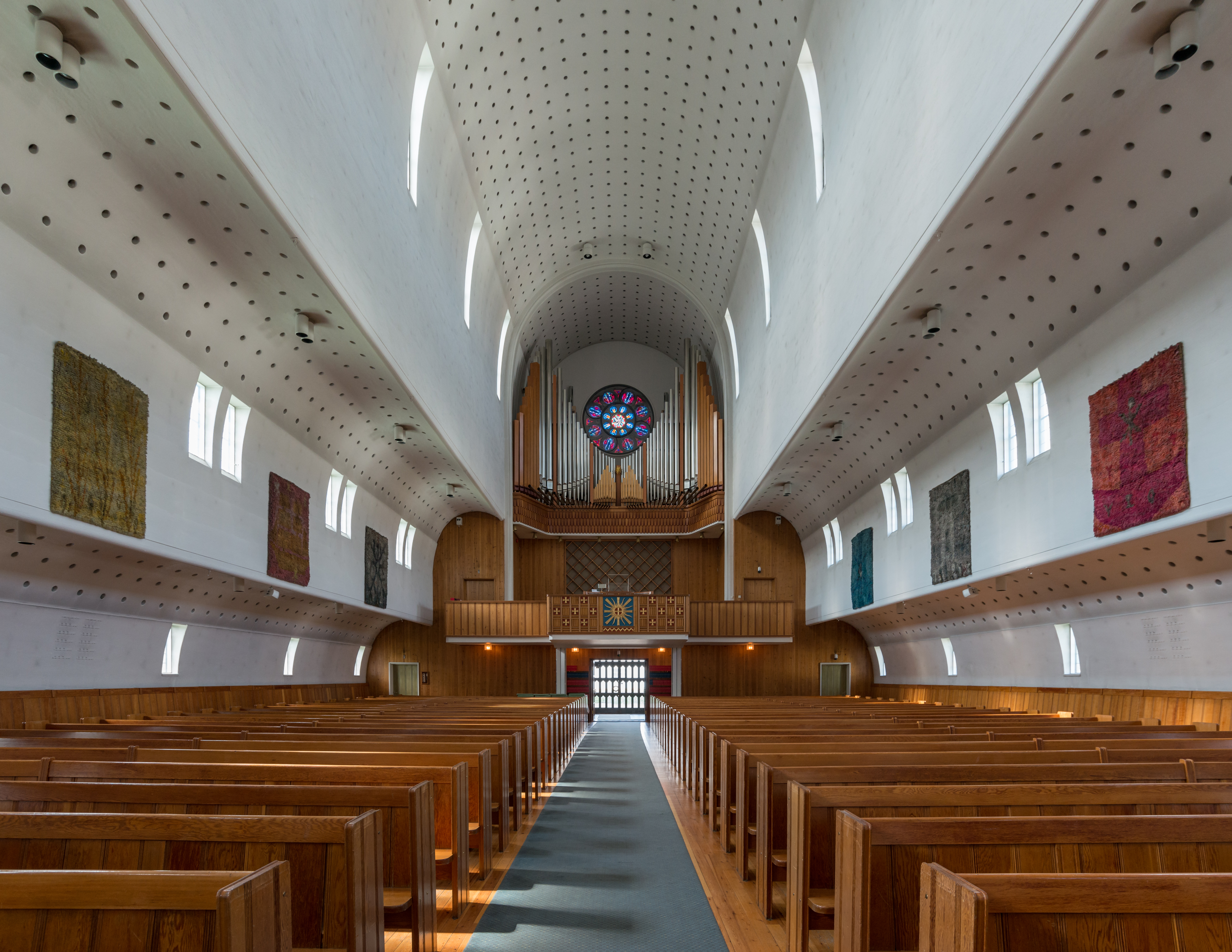
Choir loft

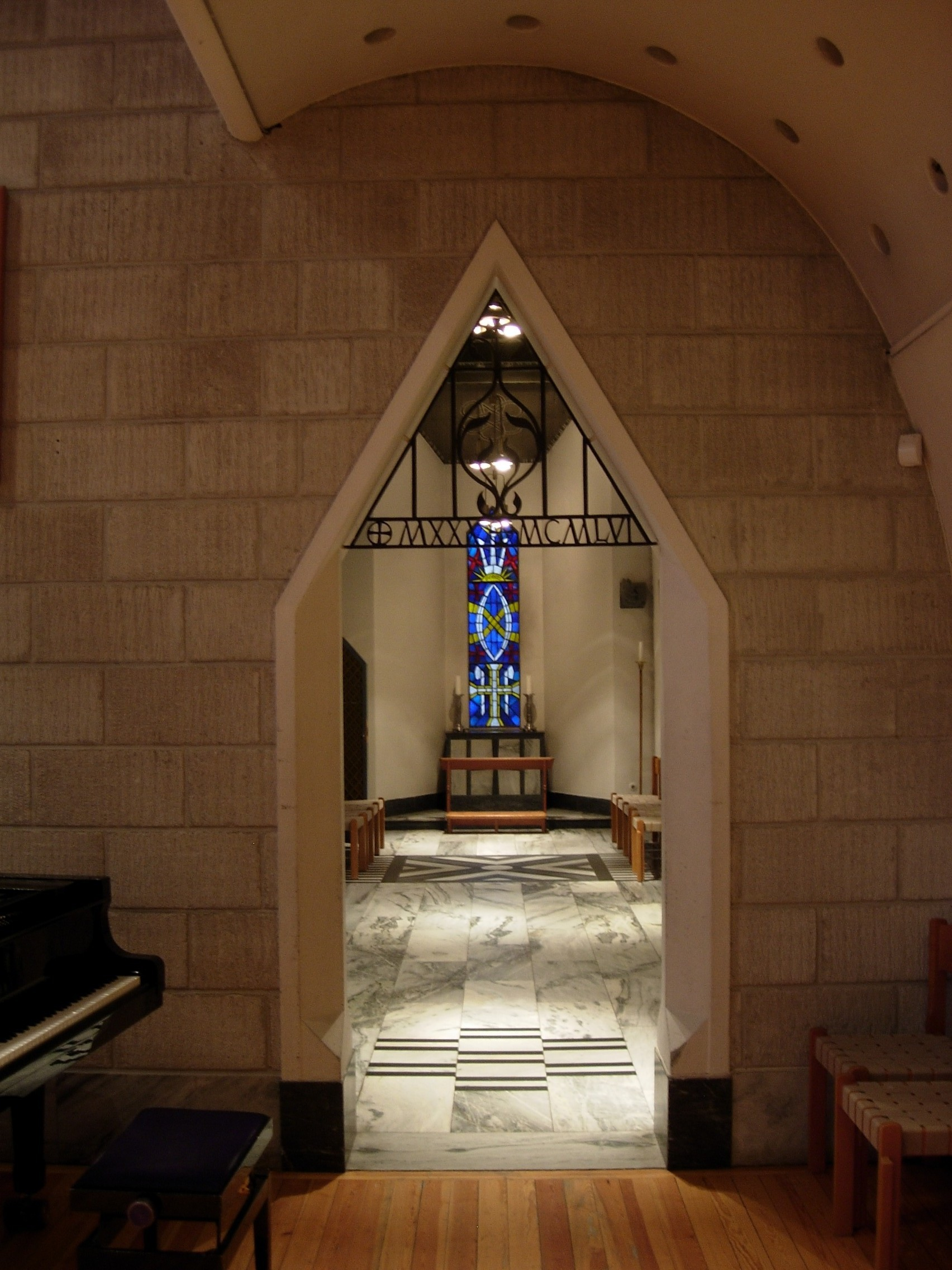
Entrance to the chapel

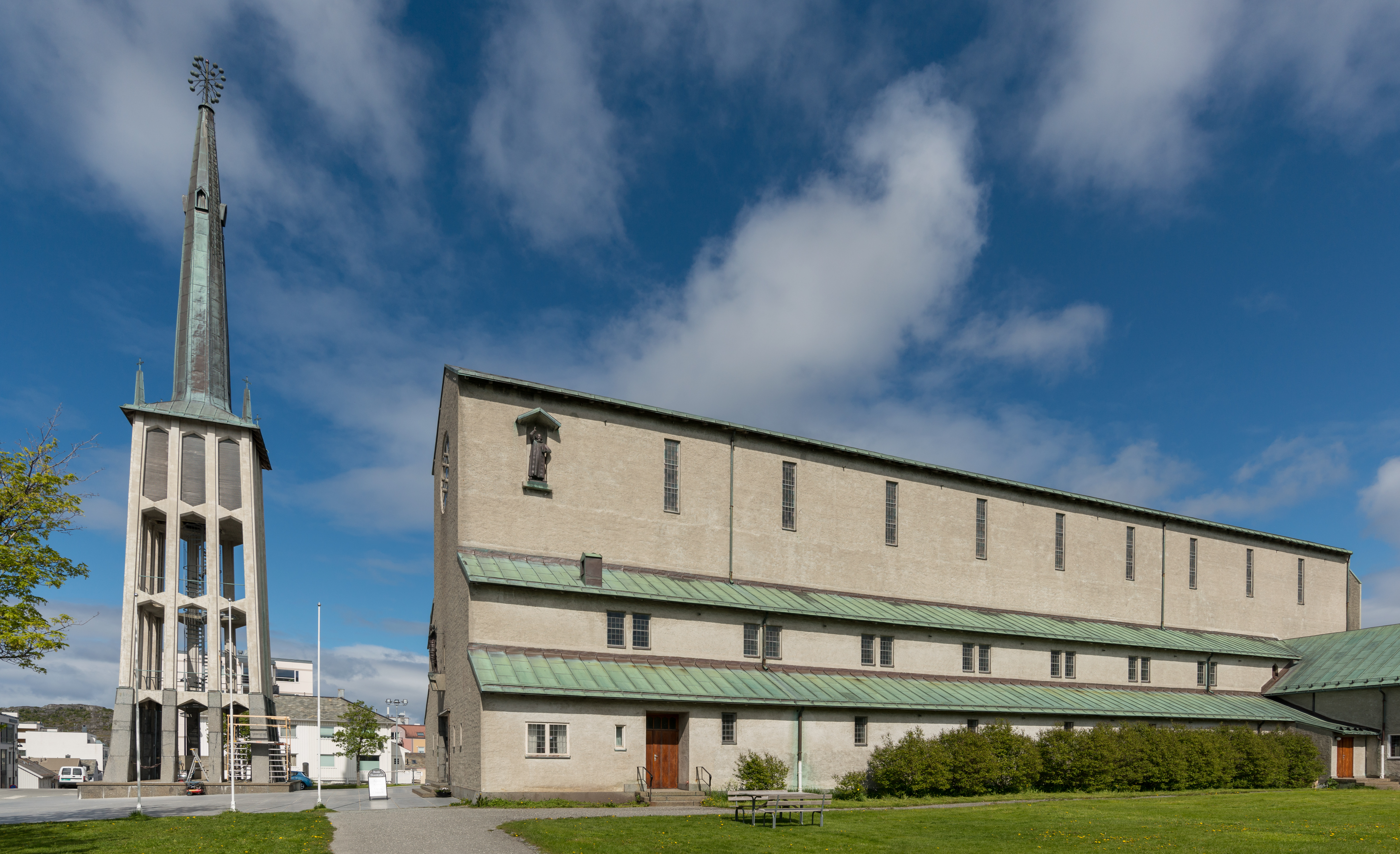
South view with clock tower

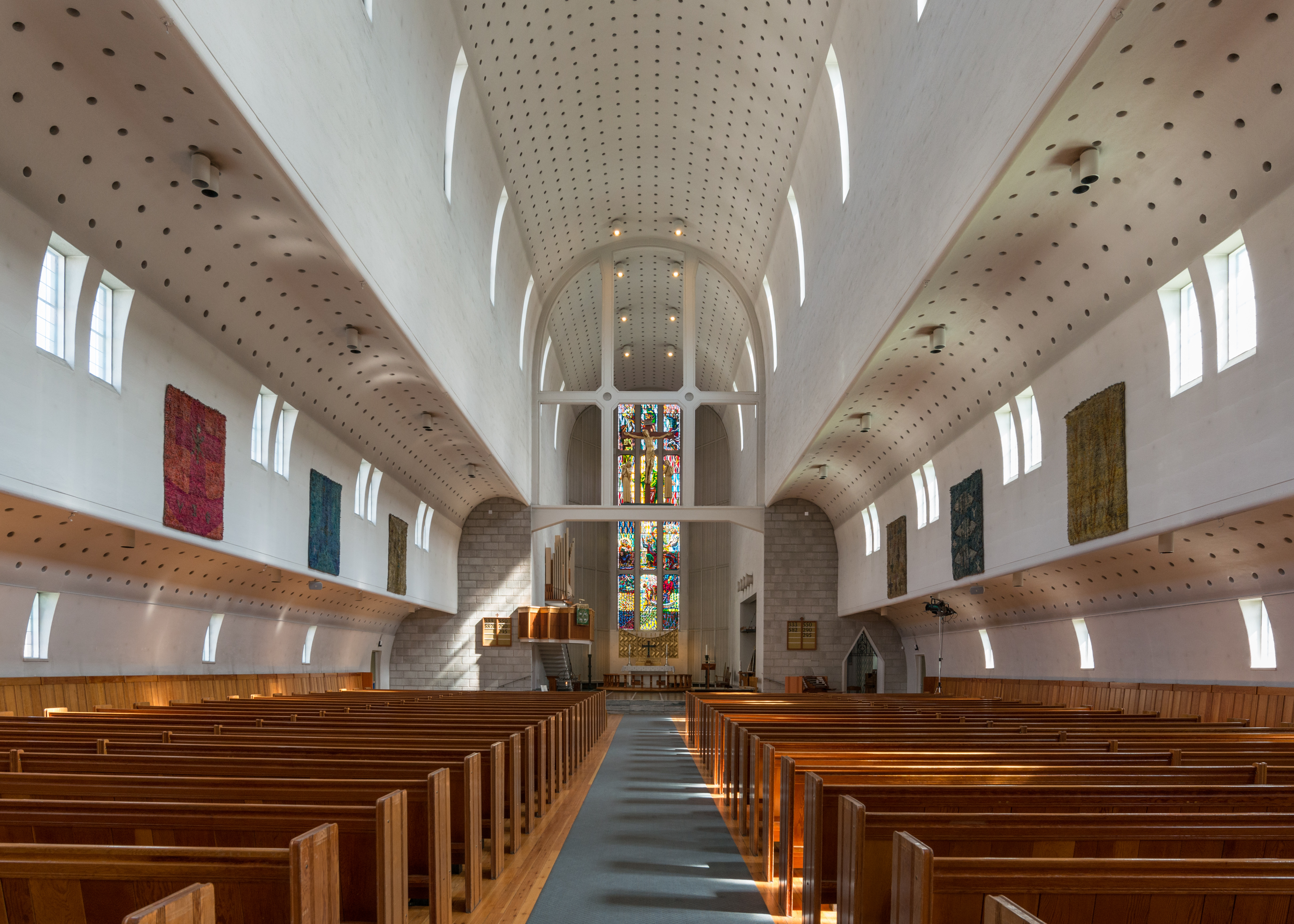
Interior

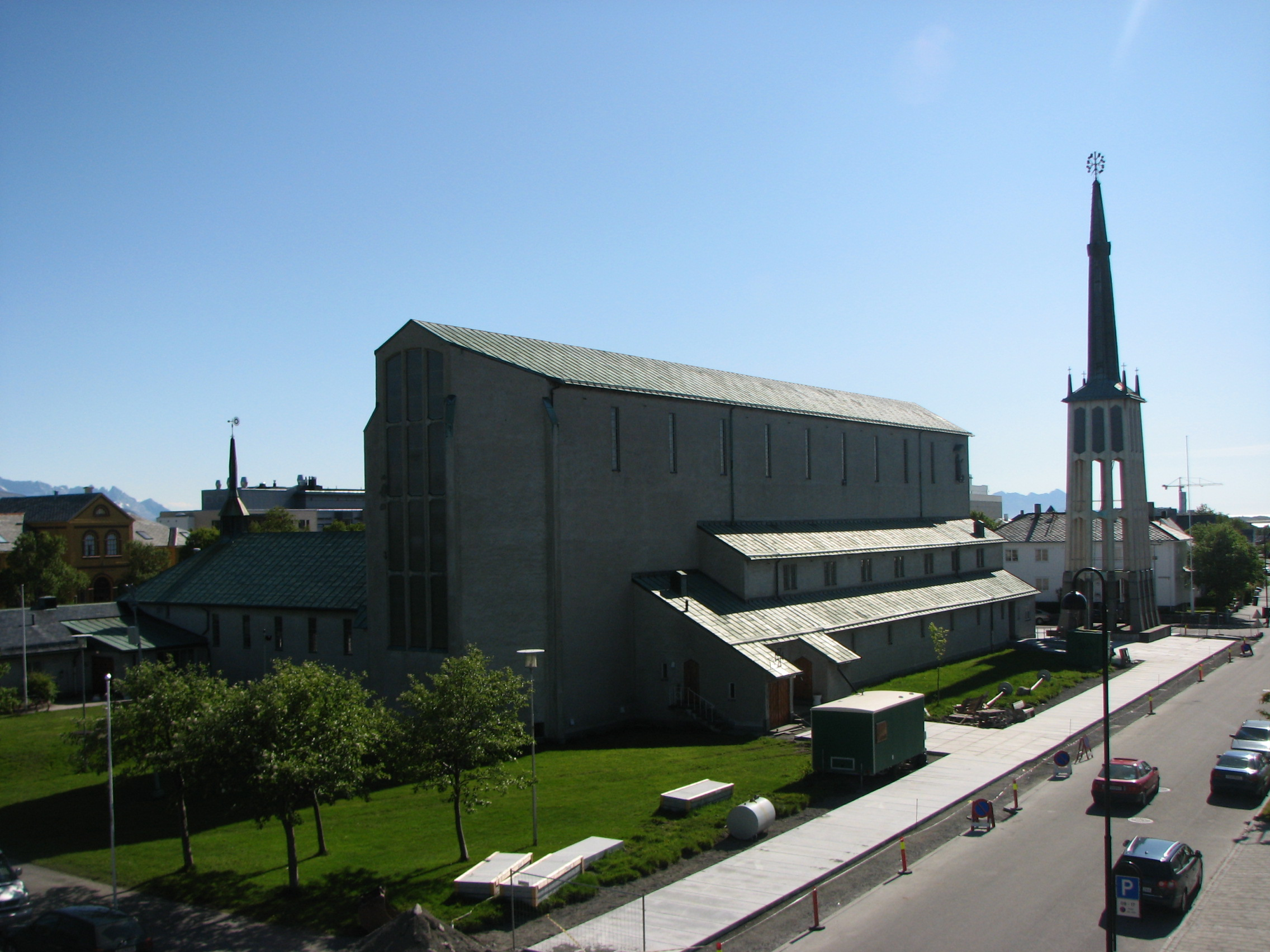
Exterior view

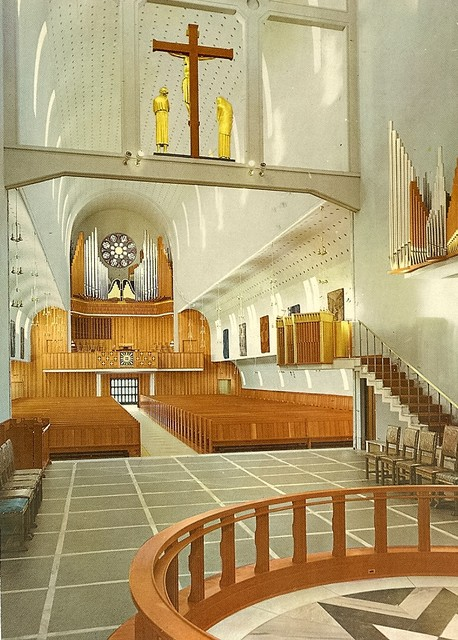
View towards congregation

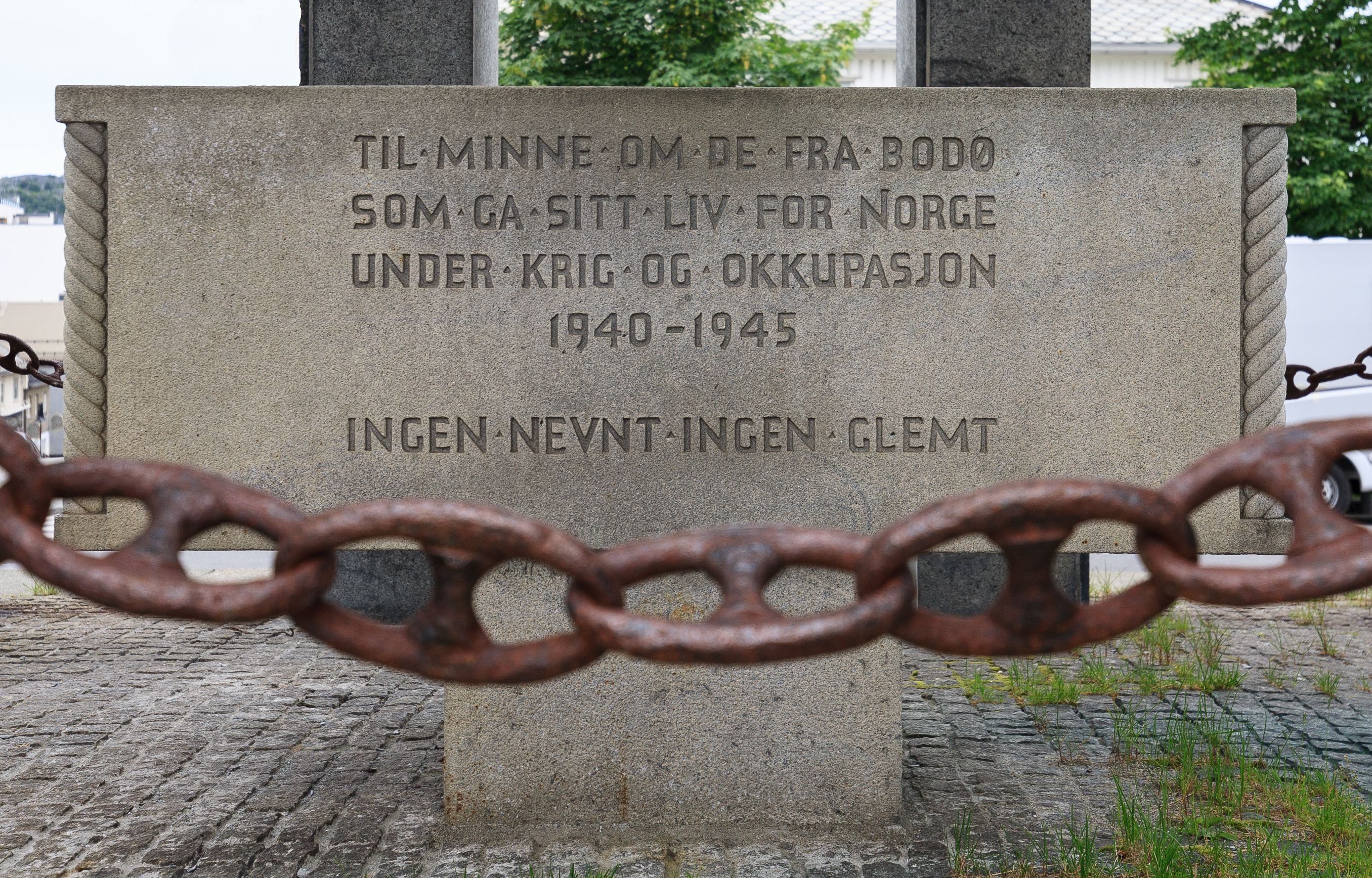
World War II memorial plaque in the bell tower of the cathedral of Bodø

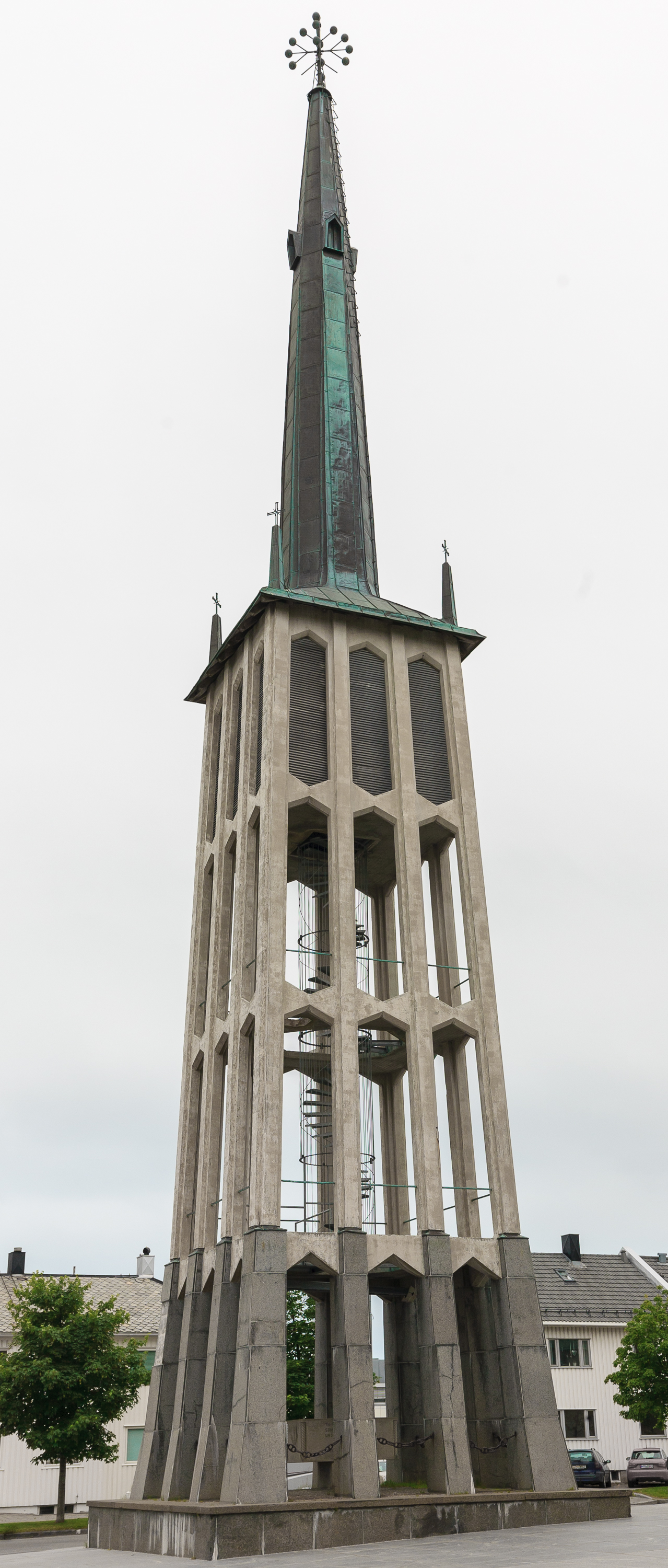
Bell tower

== See also ==
- List of churches in Sør-Hålogaland
- List of cathedrals in Norway
