= Council of Lutheran Churches =

The Council of Lutheran Churches is a Lutheran organization in Great Britain. It is a member of the Lutheran World Federation, by which it was recognized in 1989. It is affiliated with the Churches Together in Britain and Ireland and Churches Together in England. Member churches include the Nordic churches in London, Synod of German-Speaking Lutheran, Reformed and United Congregations in Great Britain, Estonian Evangelical Lutheran Church, Latvian Evangelical Lutheran Church in Great Britain, as well as the Lutheran Church in Great Britain.
