= Fredrik Grønningsæter =

20th and 21st-century bishop of the Church of Norway

The Right Reverend Fredrik Grønningsæter
- Bishop of Sør-Hålogaland
- Church: Church of Norway
- Diocese: Sør-Hålogaland
- In office: 1982–1992
- Predecessor: Bjarne Odd Weider
- Successor: Øystein Ingar Larsen

Orders
- Ordination: 21 October 1951 by Johannes Smemo
- Consecration: 1982

Personal details
- Born: 26 May 1923 Stranda, Norway
- Died: 28 April 2016 (aged 92) Oslo, Norway
- Denomination: Lutheran
- Parents: Fredrik & Katharina Grønningsæter
- Children: 5
- Education: MF Norwegian School of Theology (Cand.theol.)

Fredrik Grønningsæter (26 May 1923 – 28 April 2016) was a bishop of the Diocese of Sør-Hålogaland from 1982 until 1992.

Grønningsæter was born in Stranda Municipality in Sunnmøre, Norway on 26 May 1923. He was the son of Fredrik and Katharina (née Ottesen) Grønningsæter. His great-grandfather on his mother's side was Carl Peter Parelius Essendrop, who was also a bishop in the Church of Norway. He received his Cand.theol. degree from the MF Norwegian School of Theology in Oslo in 1951. He was ordained on 21 October 1951 by the Bishop Johannes Smemo.

Grønningsæter worked as an assistant pastor at the Nidaros Cathedral from 1957 until 1962. He was then the priest of Gimsøy in Lofoten from 1962 until 1968. He worked as a priest in Oslo from 1968 until 1972 when he became the resident chaplain at the Oslo Cathedral. He served at the Oslo Cathedral from 1972 until 1982. In 1982, he was appointed Bishop of the Diocese of Sør-Hålogaland, a post he held until he resigned in 1992. He died in 2016.

Preceded by Bjarne Odd Weider	Bishop of Sør-Hålogaland; 1982–1992	Succeeded by Øystein Ingar Larsen
