= Tor Berger Jørgensen =

20th and 21st-century Norwegian bishop

The Right Reverend Tor Berger Jørgensen
- Bishop Emeritus of Sør-Hålogaland; Bishop of the Lutheran Church in Great Britain
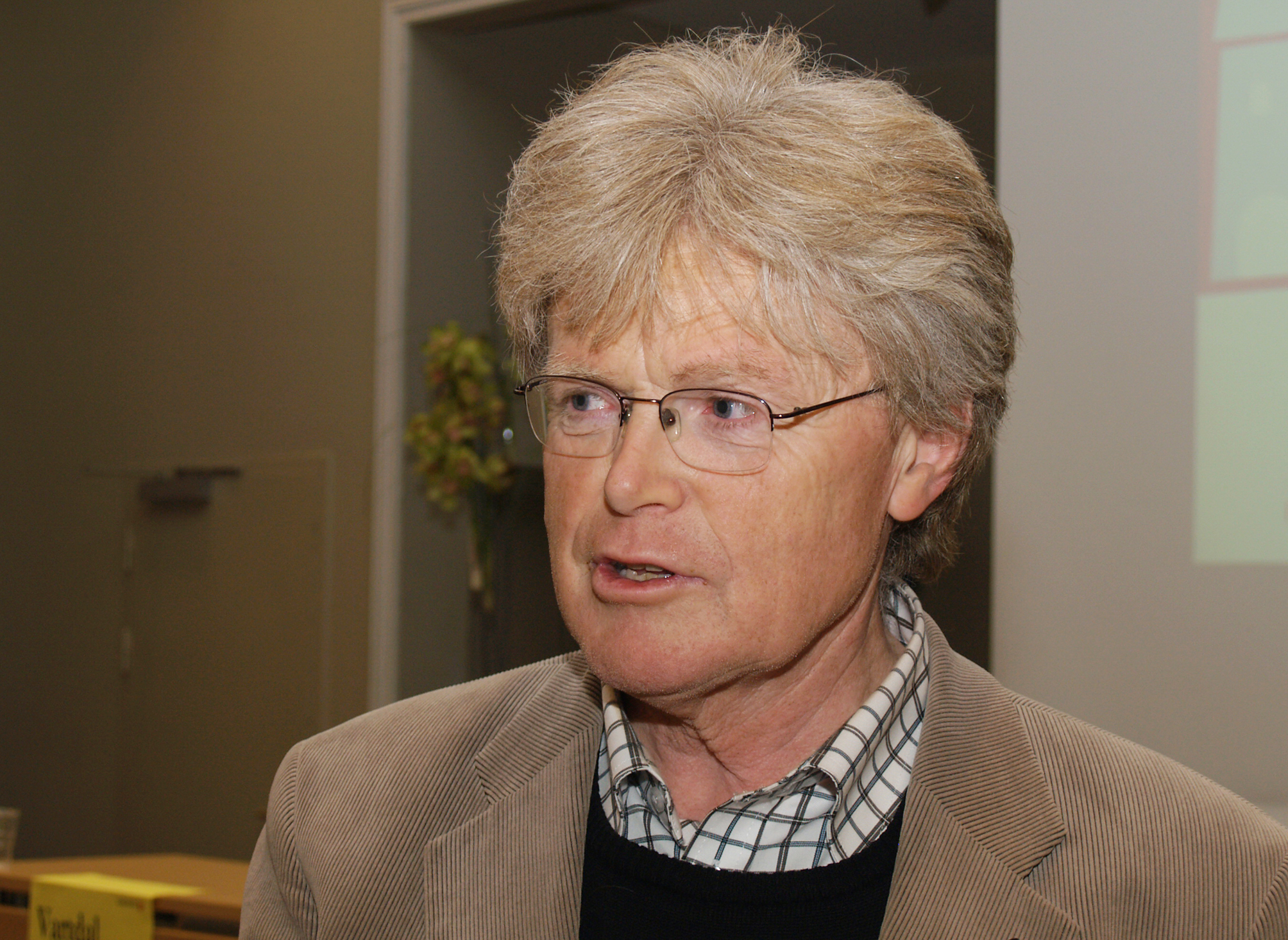
- Church: Church of Norway
- In office: 2007–2015
- Predecessor: Øystein Ingar Larsen
- Successor: Ann-Helen Fjeldstad Jusnes
- Other post: Bishop of the Lutheran Church in Great Britain (2019–2024)

Personal details
- Born: 27 December 1945 (age 80) Oslo, Norway
- Denomination: Church of Norway
- Spouse: Anne Berger Jørgensen
- Occupation: priest, provost, bishop
- Education: cand.theol.
- Alma mater: MF Norwegian School of Theology

Tor Berger Jørgensen (born 27 December 1945) is a Norwegian bishop who until 2015 was Bishop of the Diocese of Sør-Hålogaland in the Church of Norway. In 2019 he became Bishop of the Lutheran Church in Great Britain, serving until 2024.

Jørgensen was appointed the bishop of Sør-Hålogaland on 17 November 2006 and took over those duties from Øystein Ingar Larsen on 28 January 2007. Jørgensen had previously been the dean of Bodø Cathedral since 2000 and had for various periods been deputy for the bishop.

Jørgensen received the cand.theol. degree (equivalent to a combined Bachelor of Divinity and Master of Divinity) from the Misjonshøgskolen/MF Norwegian School of Theology in 1972. Jørgensen worked for 15 years as a missionary priest in Japan for the Norwegian Missionary Society. He then served as its general secretary from 1991 to 1999. Jørgensen was a candidate for bishop of the Diocese of Oslo in 2005, but Ole Christian Kvarme was elected.

== Beliefs ==
In 2000, Jørgensen supported the full inclusion of LGBT persons in the Church of Norway. He is considered to be one of the liberal bishops in the church's General Synod. A week before he became bishop, he gave an interview to a newspaper stating that he supported a ritual in church for same-sex couples to take part in a Civil union.

In 2009, Jørgensen ordained a female priest that was unmarried and living with the father of her child. The issue of cohabitation of unmarried priests is a controversial topic in the Church of Norway. Some called for his resignation.

Evangelical Lutheran Church titles
Preceded by Øystein Ingar Larsen	Bishop of Sør-Hålogaland; 2007-2015	Succeeded by Ann-Helen Fjeldstad Jusnes
Preceded by Martin Lind	Bishop of the Lutheran Church in Great Britain; 2019 -	Succeeded by Incumbent
