= Nicolaus Christian Friis =

Norwegian priest and theologian (1714–1777)

Nicolaus Christian Friis (1 February 1714 – 22 May 1777) was a Norwegian priest and theologian.

Niels or Nicolai Friis was born at Lille-Fosen (now Kristiansund) in Romsdalen county, Norway. Friis attended the Trondheim Cathedral School and graduated with a degree in theology from the University of Copenhagen in 1736. In 1737, he was appointed assistant pastor at Alstahaug Church.

In 1744, he was appointed parish priest at Bodin Church in Nordland county, Norway. The following year, he married Sophie à Möinichen Randulf (1693–1779), the widow of bailiff Søren Randulf who had died 1743. In 1754, he was assigned the position of Titular Bishop of the Diocese of Nidaros in Trondheim, a title for which he paid 8,000 riksdaler to achieve. In 1771, Friis received the office of senior priest (sogneprest) at Korskirken in Bergen which he held until he was granted leave of retirement in 1774. From the 1770s he published several scientific works on the fisheries in Northern Norway. The life of Friis is treated by several biographers. He died in Bergen in 1777.

== Selected works ==
- Illustration til Bispevisitatserne i Nordland og Finmarken - 1771

== Related reading ==
- Eilertsen, Turid Følling (1990) Bodin kirke 750 år: «hvor elskelig dine boliger er … (Bodø: Bodin menighetsråd) ISBN 8290412827
