= Øystein Ingar Larsen =

Bishop of the Church of Norway (born 1941)

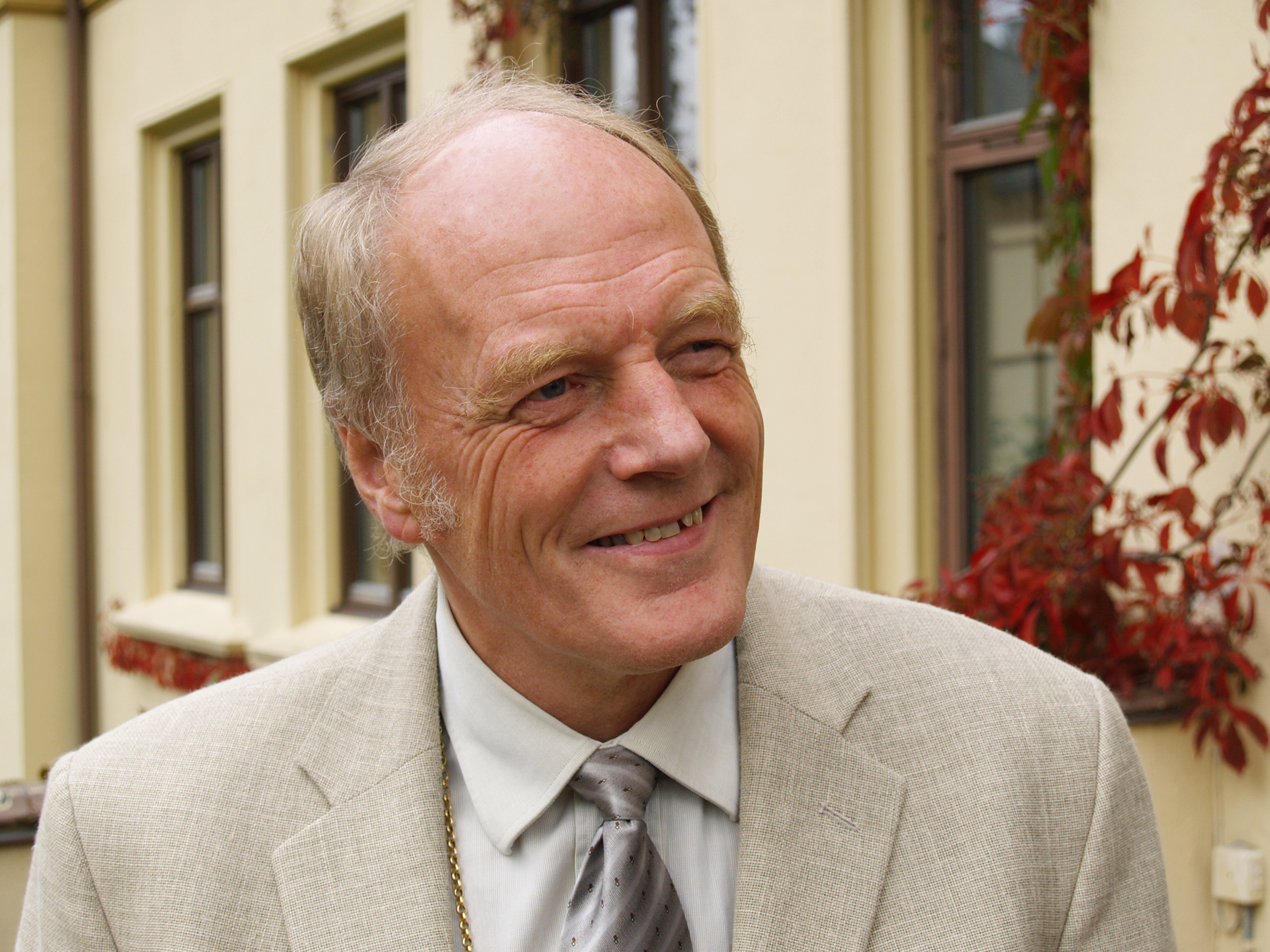
- Born: 1 November 1941 (age 84); Aker, Norway
- Education: cand.theol.
- Alma mater: MF Norwegian School of Theology
- Occupations: Priest, Bishop
- Spouse: Marit Hansen

Øystein Ingar Larsen (born 1 November 1941 in Aker) was Bishop of the Diocese of Sør-Hålogaland from 1992 to 2006.

Larsen grew up in Høyenhall in Aker. He received his cand.theol. degree at the MF Norwegian School of Theology in 1966. He was ordained as a priest in 1967. Larsen worked for the Norwegian Inner Mission from 1968 to 1972. From 1972 to 1979 he was the resident chaplain at Høybråten, from 1979 to 1986 he worked at the School of Theology. From 1986 to 1992 he was the parish priest at Furuset. He was appointed the bishop of Sør-Hålogaland in 1992 and held that position until he retired on 1 December 2006.

He was married to Marit Hansen in 1966, and the two have three children.

| Preceded by Fredrik Grønningsæter | Bishop of Sør-Hålogaland; 1992–2006 | Succeeded by Tor Berger Jørgensen |
