= Bodin Church =

Church in Nordland, Norway

- Bodin kirke
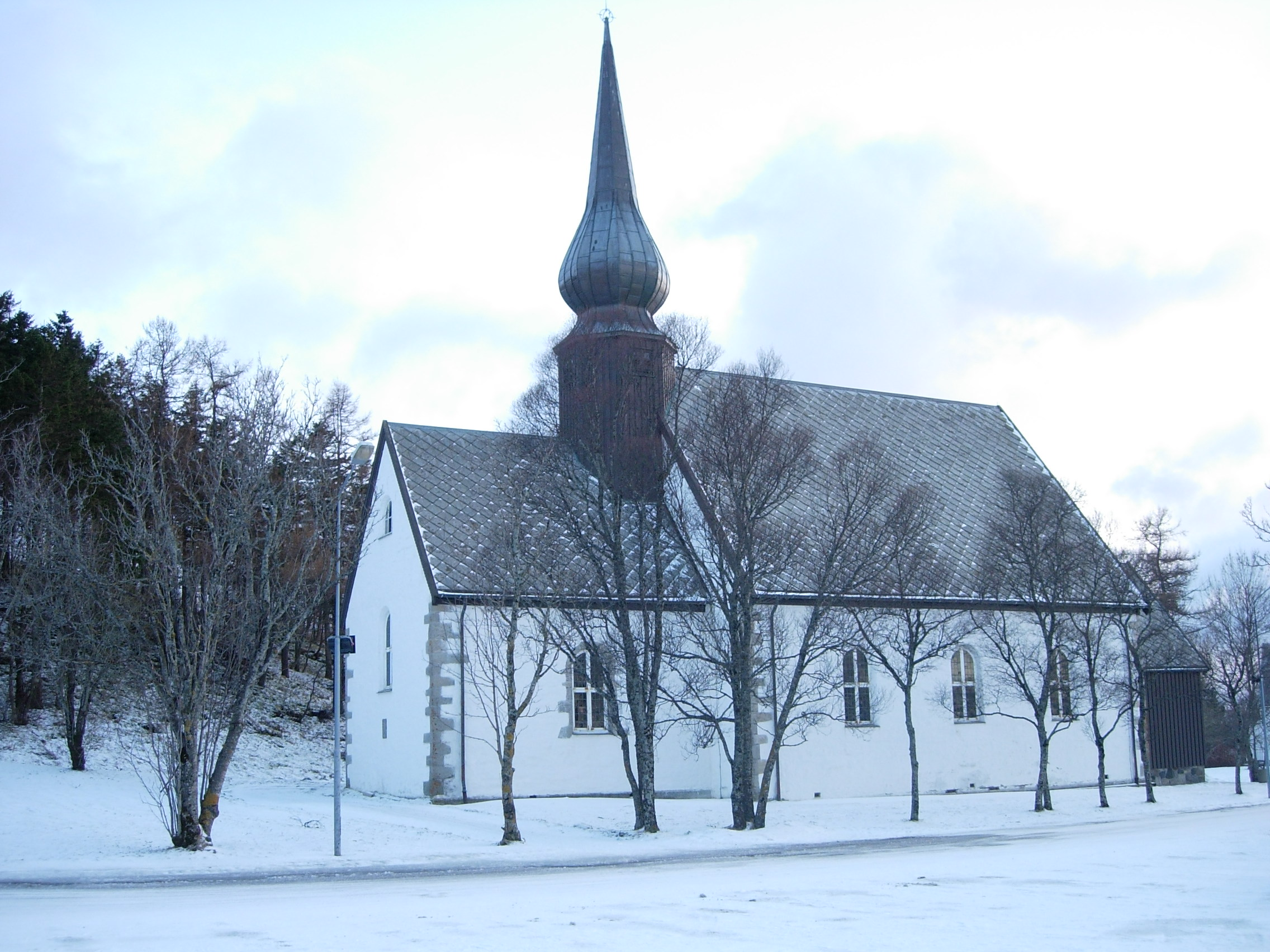
- View of the church
- Bodin Church
- 67.27406179°N 14.43474903°E
- Location: Bodø Municipality, Nordland
- Country: Norway
- Denomination: Church of Norway
- Previous denomination: Catholic Church
- Churchmanship: Evangelical Lutheran

History
- Status: Parish church
- Founded: c. 1240

Architecture
- Functional status: Active
- Architectural type: Long church
- Completed: c. 1240 (786 years ago)

Specifications
- Capacity: 300
- Materials: Stone

Administration
- Diocese: Sør-Hålogaland
- Deanery: Bodø domprosti
- Parish: Bodin
- Norwegian Cultural Heritage Site
- Type: Church
- Status: Automatically protected
- ID: 83917

Bodin Church (Norwegian: Bodin kirke) is a parish church of the Church of Norway in Bodø Municipality in Nordland county, Norway. It is located in the southeastern part of the town of Bodø. It is one of the churches for the Bodin parish which is part of the Bodø domprosti (deanery) in the Diocese of Sør-Hålogaland. The white, stone church was built in a long church style around the year 1240 using plans drawn up by an unknown architect. The church seats about 300 people.

== History ==
The earliest existing historical records of the church date back to the year 1321, but the church was likely built around the year 1240. The stone building had a rectangular nave with a narrower, nearly square chancel with a lower roof line. In 1785, a transept was built on the south side of the nave to enlarge the building and it now seats about 300 people. In 1894, the entire old portion of the medieval church was torn down and rebuilt in the same style.

In 1814, this church served as an election church (Norwegian: valgkirke). Together with more than 300 other parish churches across Norway, it was a polling station for elections to the 1814 Norwegian Constituent Assembly which wrote the Constitution of Norway. This was one of Norway's first national elections. Each church parish was a constituency that elected people called "electors" who later met together in each county to elect the representatives for the assembly that was to meet at Eidsvoll Manor later that year.

The church is characterized today largely by an interior from the 17th and 18th century. The chandeliers date from the 1760s. In 2003, the church received a replica of a Baroque organ from the 1700s. The church has a stone altar from the 14th century and some wooden sculptures dating from the late 15th century to the early 16th century. The altarpiece is from 1670. The pulpit is from the 17th century with paintings from 1753 by German born artist Gottfried Ezekiel (ca. 1719–1798) who was engaged by parish priest Nicolaus Christian Friis. Ezekiel first received a commission as a painter in Bergen during 1744. Dating from 1751 he arrived in northern Norway, where he painted a number of church altarpieces.

== Gallery ==
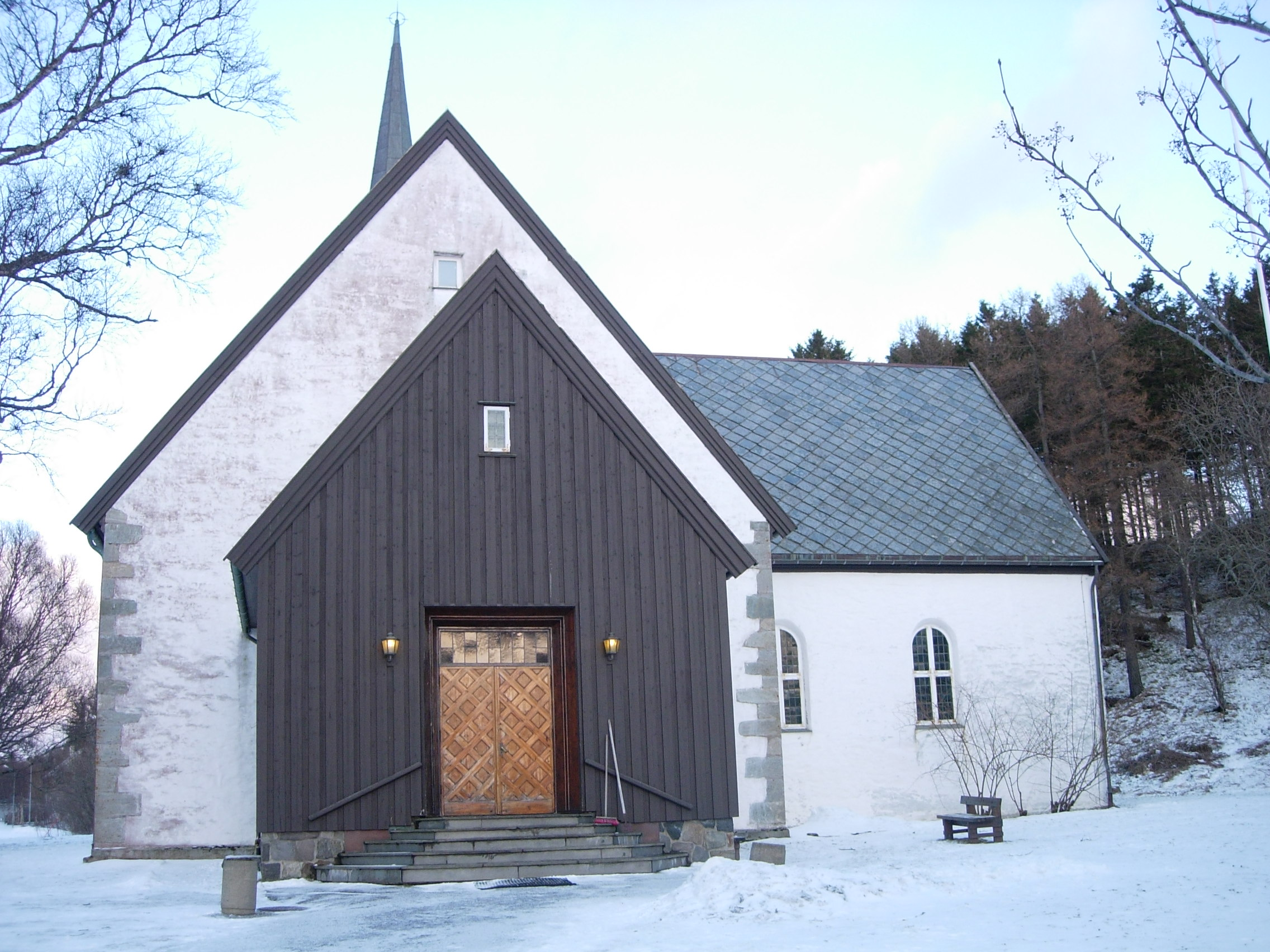
Front entrance

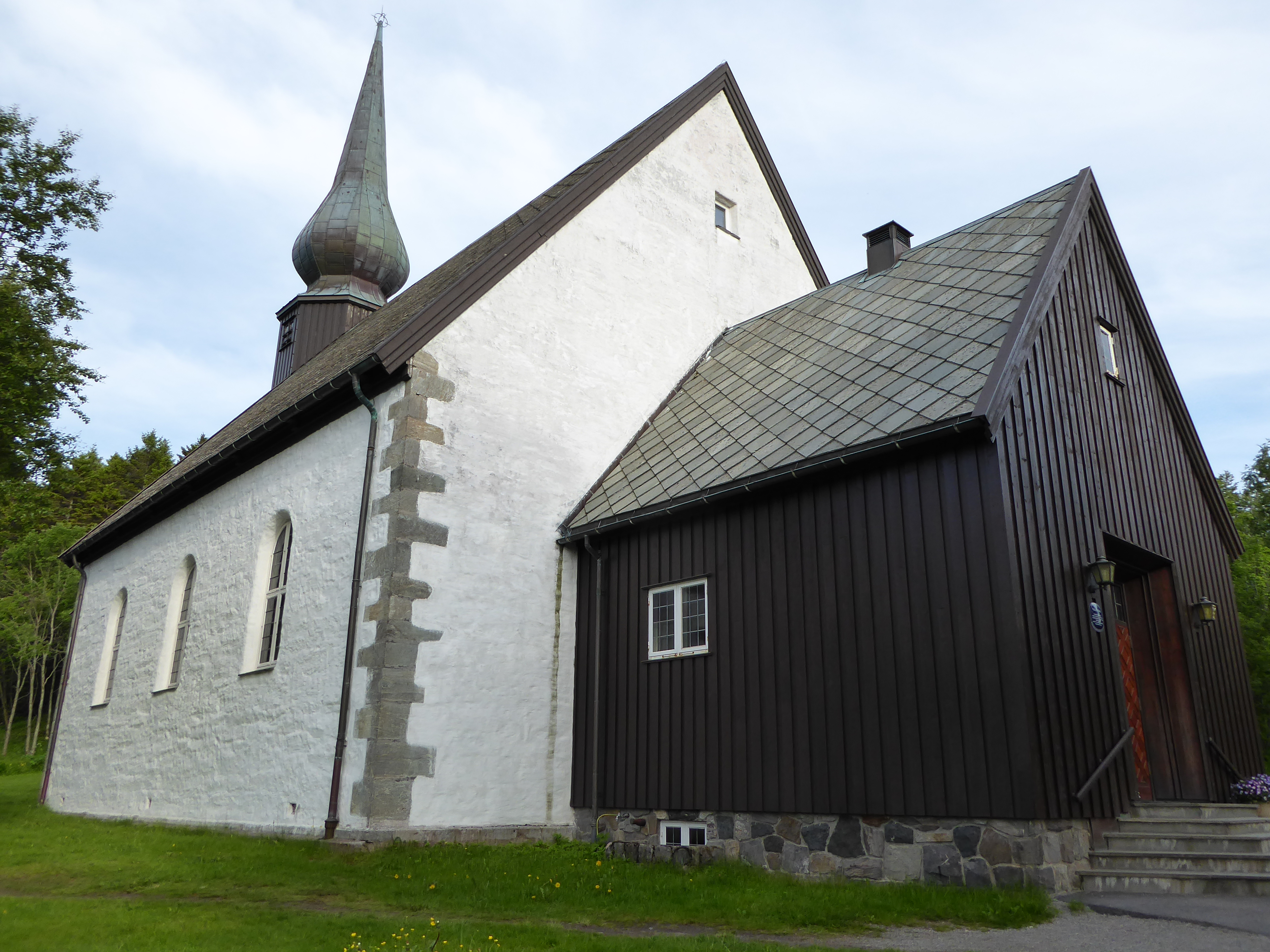
Side view

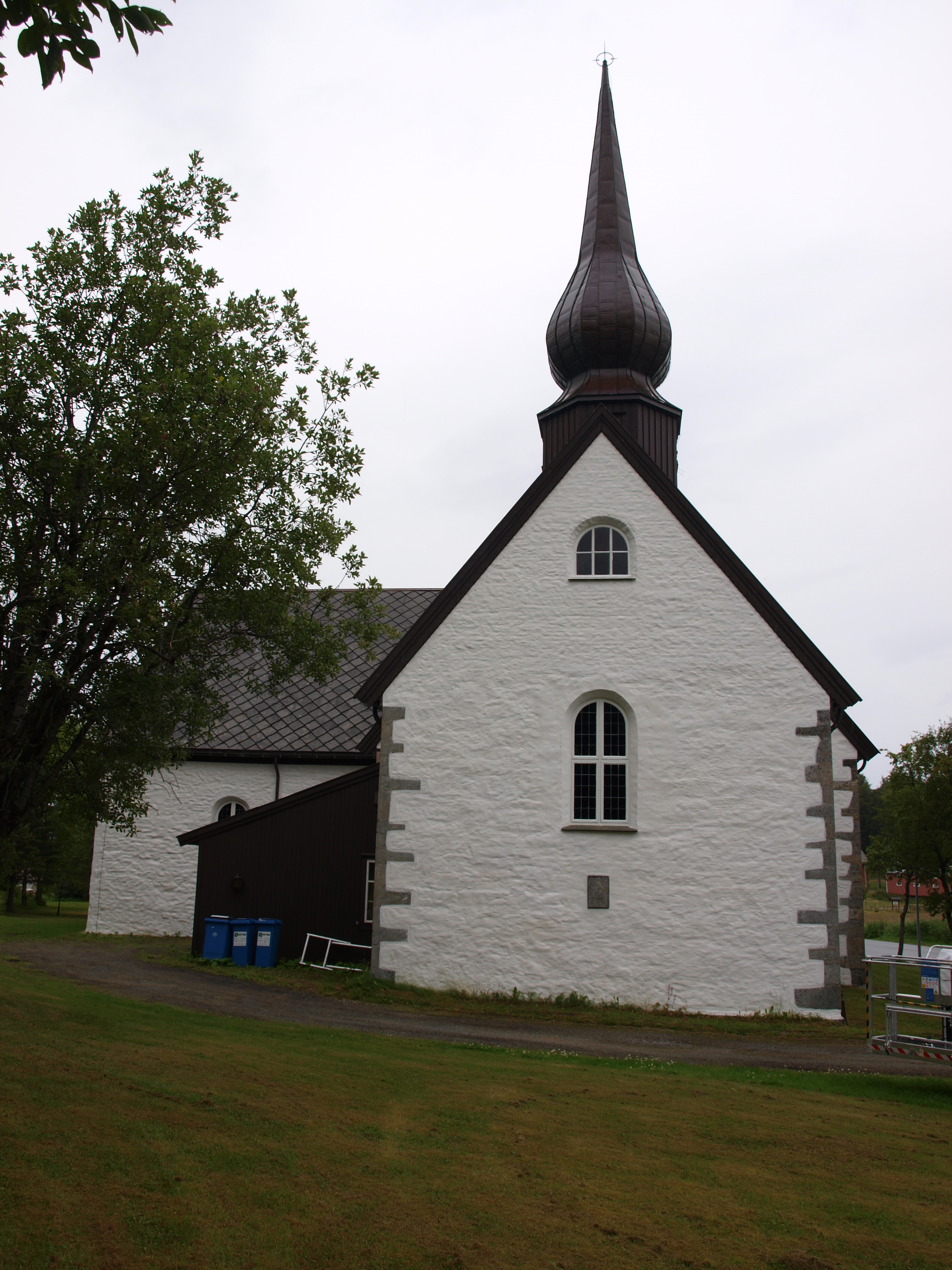
Side and steeple

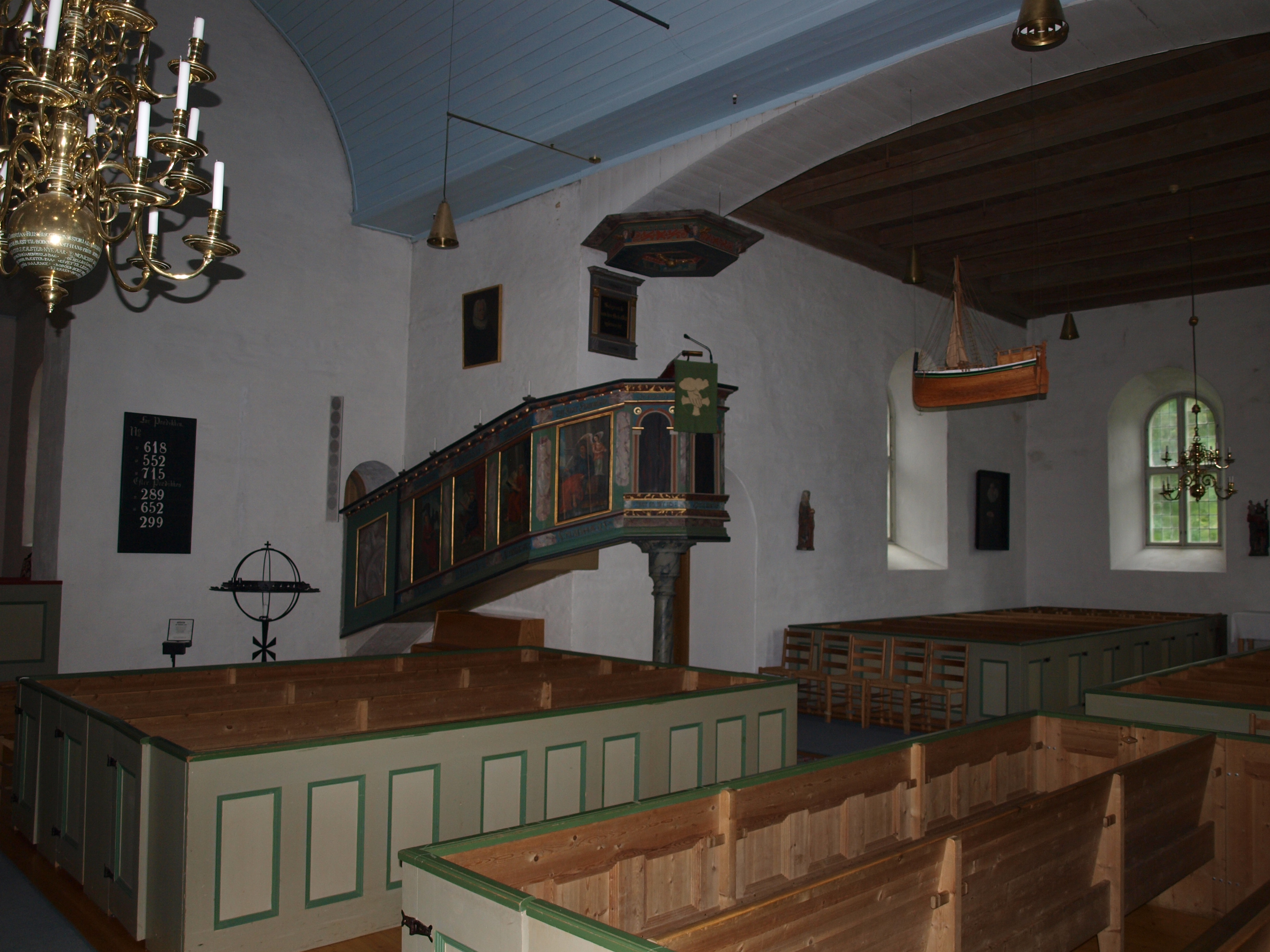
Sanctuary and pulpit

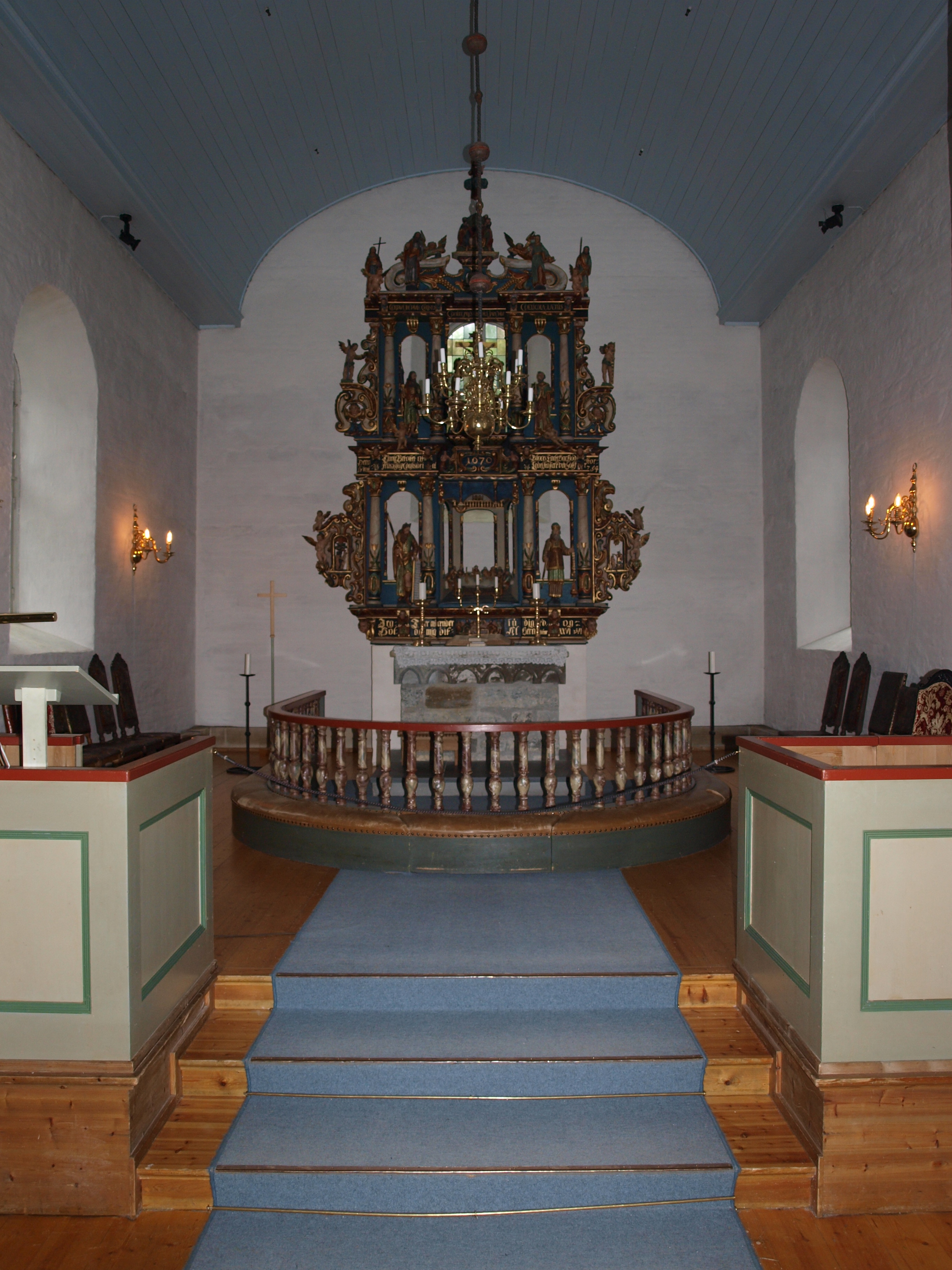
Altar

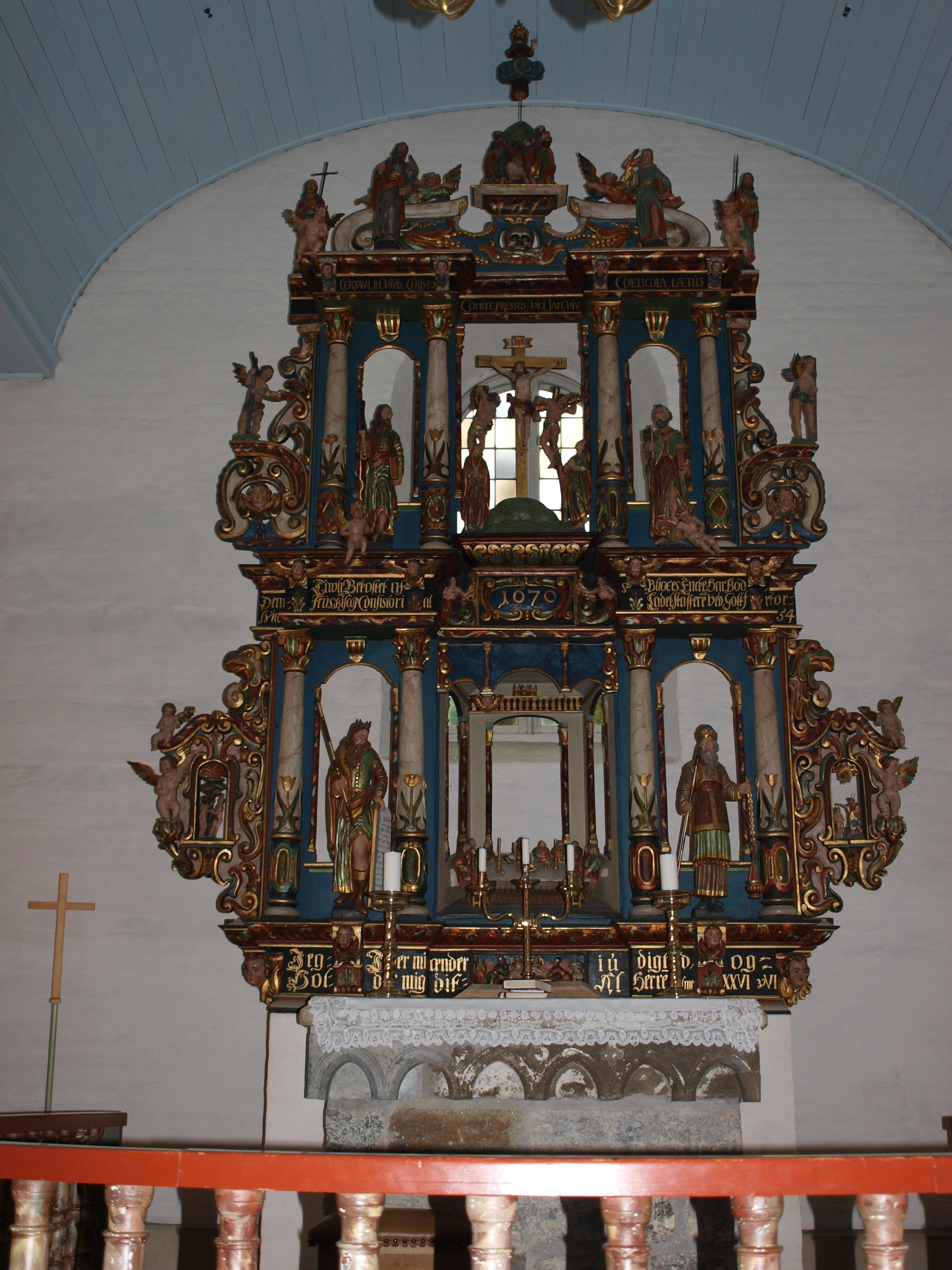
Altarpiece

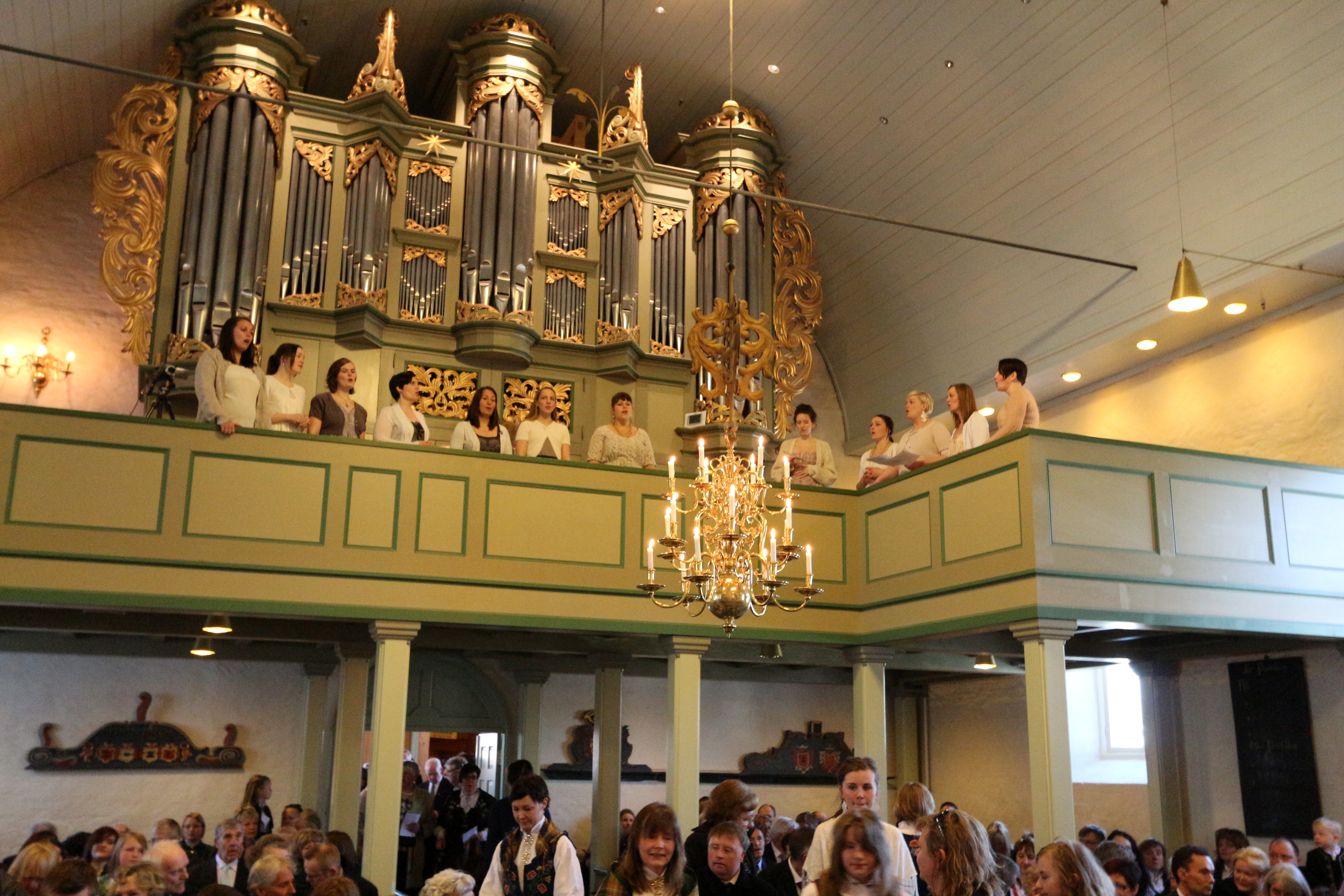
Organ and choir loft

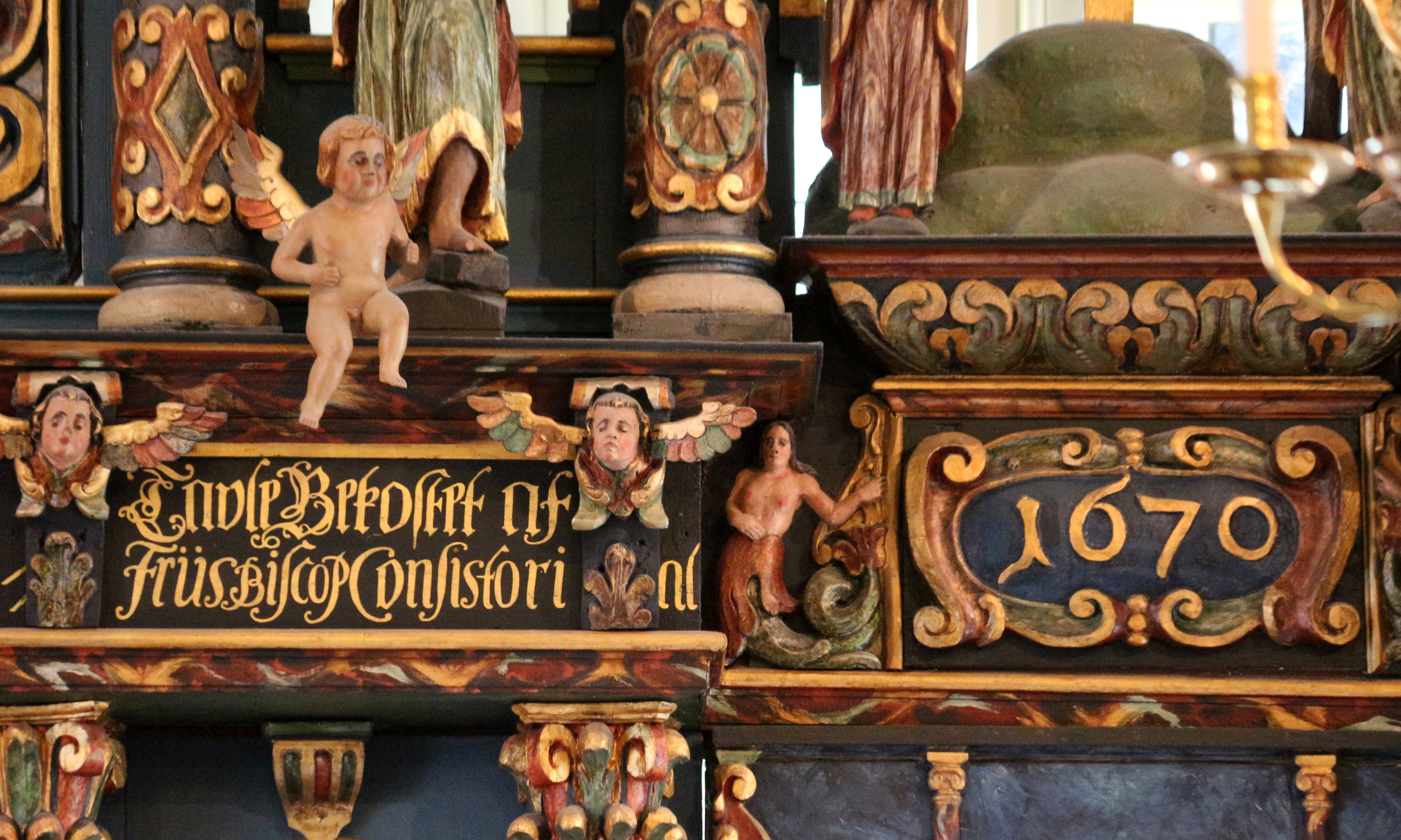
Altarpiece detail

== See also ==
- List of churches in Sør-Hålogaland

== Related reading ==
- Eilertsen, Turid Følling (1990). Bodin kirke 750 år: "hvor elskelig dine boliger er..." (in Norwegian). Bodø: Bodin menighetsråd. ISBN 8290412827.
