= Ann-Helen Fjeldstad Jusnes =

Norwegian bishop

The Right Reverend Ann-Helen Fjeldstad Jusnes
- Bishop of Sør-Hålogaland
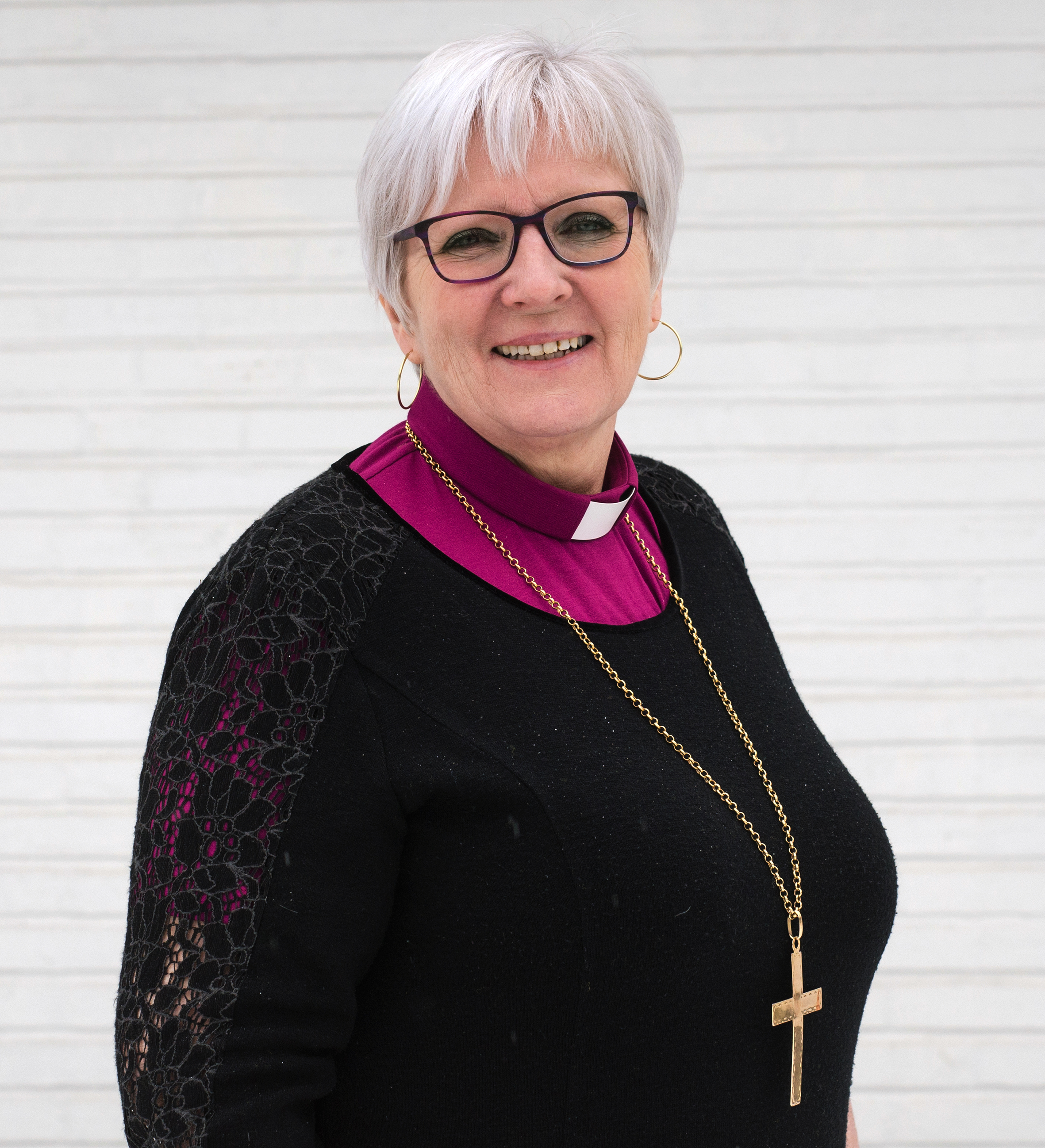
- Church: Church of Norway
- In office: 2015
- Predecessor: Tor Berger Jørgensen

Orders
- Ordination: 1984
- Consecration: 24 January 2016 by Helga Haugland Byfuglien

Personal details
- Born: 21 July 1956 (age 69)
- Denomination: Lutheran

Ann-Helen Fjeldstad Jusnes (born 21 July 1956) is a Norwegian bishop of the Diocese of Sør-Hålogaland. She succeeded Tor Berger Jørgensen on 24 January 2016. Before she became a bishop, Jusnes was the Dean of Lofoten for eight years, and had previously also been a member and politician of the Labor Party in Flakstad Municipality.

== Biography ==
Jusnes was ordained a priest in 1984 and has worked as a priest in Hamar and the Diocese of Sør-Hålogaland. She spent the majority of her priesthood in Lofoten, with two periods as a pastor in Flakstad Municipality and eight years as a Dean for the Lofoten prosti.

Ann-Helen Fjelstad Jusnes was nominated as a candidate to succeed Tor Berger Jørgensen as Bishop of Sør-Hålogaland in 2015, and received the greatest support from all candidates in all consultation rounds. On 17 September she was elected bishop by the church council, being the fourth person, and first woman, to be elected by the church council since gaining autonomy from the Norwegian government.
