= Diocese of Sør-Hålogaland =

Diocese in the Church of Norway

Diocese of Sør-Hålogaland Sør-Hålogaland bispedømme
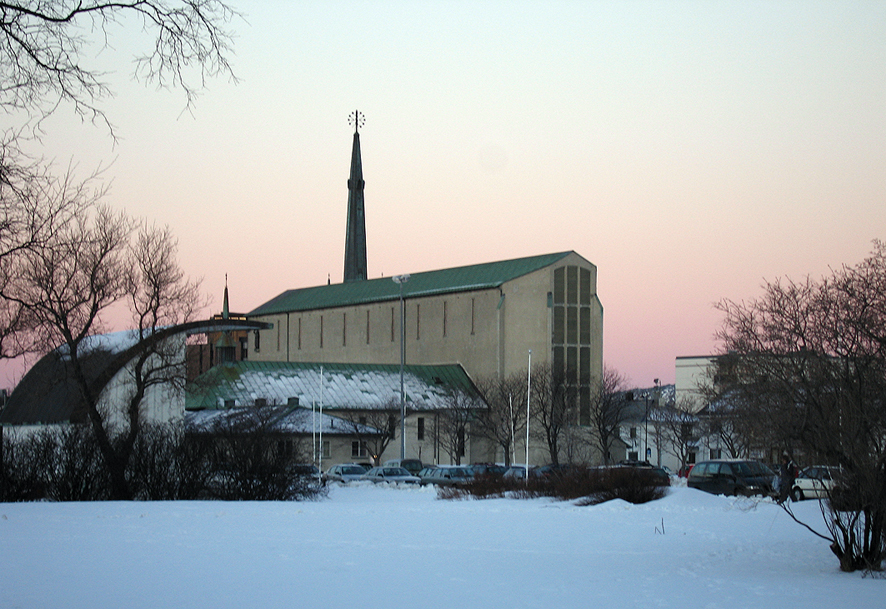
- View of Bodø Cathedral

Location
- Country: Norway
- Territory: Nordland
- Deaneries: Bodø domprosti, Lofoten, Ofoten, Vesterålen, Salten, Nord-Helgeland, Indre Helgeland, Sør-Helgeland

Statistics
- Parishes: 96
- Members: 198,420

Information
- Denomination: Church of Norway
- Established: 1952
- Cathedral: Bodø Cathedral

Current leadership
- Bishop: Ann-Helen Fjeldstad Jusnes

Map
- Location of Sør-Hålogaland diocese

Website
- https://www.kirken.no/sor-haalogaland

Sør-Hålogaland is a diocese in the Church of Norway. The Diocese covers the Lutheran Church of Norway churches located within Nordland county in Norway. The diocese is headquartered in the town of Bodø at Bodø Cathedral, the seat of bishop Svein Valle (since november 2023). The diocese is divided into eight deaneries (prosti).

== History ==
In 1952, the old Diocese of Hålogaland (which covered all of Northern Norway) was split into two: the Diocese of Sør-Hålogaland (Nordland county) and the Diocese of Nord-Hålogaland (Troms, Finnmark, and Svalbard).

== Bishops ==
The bishops of Sør-Hålogaland since its creation in 1952:

- 1952–1959: Wollert Krohn-Hansen
- 1959–1969: Hans Edvard Wisløff
- 1969–1982: Bjarne Odd Weider
- 1982–1992: Fredrik Grønningsæter
- 1992–2006: Øystein Ingar Larsen
- 2007-2015: Tor Berger Jørgensen
- 2015-2023: Ann-Helen Fjeldstad Jusnes
- since 2023: Svein Valle

== Cathedral ==
The old church in Bodø was destroyed during World War II, and after the war plans were made to replace the church and make it the cathedral for the new diocese. The foundation stone was laid in 1954 and was consecrated by Bishop Wollert Krohn-Hansen in 1956. There is also a memorial to those who died in Bodø during the Second World War.

== Structure ==
The Diocese of Sør-Hålogaland is divided into eight deaneries (Norwegian: prosti). Each one corresponds to several municipalities in the diocese. Each municipality is further divided into one or more parishes which each contain one or more congregations. See each municipality below for lists of churches and parishes within them.

Deanery (prosti)	Municipalities	Diocese Map
Bodø domprosti (Map: lower blue)	Bodø, Gildeskål, Meløy, Røst, Værøy	
Lofoten prosti (Map: upper green)	Flakstad, Moskenes, Vestvågøy, Vågan	
Vesterålen prosti (Map: upper blue)	Andøy, Bø, Hadsel, Sortland, Øksnes	
Ofoten prosti (Map: red)	Evenes, Hamarøy, Lødingen, Narvik	
Salten prosti (Map: upper yellow)	Beiarn, Fauske, Saltdal, Steigen, Sørfold	
Nord-Helgeland prosti (Map: light blue)	Alstahaug, Dønna, Herøy, Leirfjord, Lurøy, Nesna, Rødøy, Træna	
Indre Helgeland prosti (Map: lower green)	Grane, Hattfjelldal, Hemnes, Rana, Vefsn	
Sør-Helgeland prosti (Map: lower yellow)	Bindal, Brønnøy, Sømna, Vega, Vevelstad	
