= Bockman =

Bockman is a surname. Notable people with the surname include:

- Eddie Bockman (1920–2011), American professional baseball third baseman and scout
- Gerhard Bockman (1686–1773), Dutch portrait painter
- Knut Bøckman (1932–2008), Norwegian chess player
- Nils Christoffer Bøckman (1880–1973), Norwegian lieutenant-colonel and businessperson
- Peter W. K. Bøckman Sr. (1851–1926), Norwegian bishop
- Peter W. K. Bøckman Jr. (1927–2006), Norwegian professor

== See also ==
- Boeckmann
- Bøckmann
