= Peter Bøckman =

Peter Bøckman may refer to:

- Peter W. K. Bøckman Sr. (1851–1926), Norwegian bishop and theologian
- Peter W. K. Bøckman Jr. (1927–2006), Norwegian religious studies scholar
