= Boeckman =

Boeckman may refer to:

- Alan L. Boeckmann, American businessman
- Todd Boeckman, American football player
- Vicki Boeckman, American musician

Von Boeckman

- James Von Boeckman, American politician
- Ramona von Boeckman, American basketball player

== See also ==
- Boeckman Bridge, Missouri, US
- Kris Boeckmans, Belgian cyclist
- Beckman (disambiguation)
- Boeckmann
