= Wisløff =

Wisløff is a Norwegian surname. Notable people with the surname include:

- Åse Wisløff Nilssen (born 1945), Norwegian politician
- Carl Fredrik Wisløff (1908–2004), Norwegian theologian
- Jens Wisløff (1921–1998), Norwegian politician
- Hans Edvard Wisløff (1902–1969), 20th-century bishop of the Church of Norway
- Ove Wisløff (born 1954), Norwegian swimmer
- Ulrik Wisløff (born 1968), Norwegian physiologist
