= Boeck =

Boeck or De Boeck is a surname. Notable people with the surname include:

- August de Boeck (1865–1937), Flemish composer, organist and music pedagogue
- Cæsar Peter Møller Boeck (1845–1917), Norwegian dermatologist born in Lier
- Carl Wilhelm Boeck (1808–1875), Norwegian dermatologist born in Kongsberg
- Christian Peder Bianco Boeck (1798–1877), Norwegian doctor, zoologist, botanist and mountaineer
- Erna Boeck or Erna Steinberg (1911–2001), German track and field athlete who specialised in sprinting events
- Eugen von Boeck (1823–1886), German educator and scientist who lived in Chile, Peru and Bolivia
- Glen De Boeck (1971–2025), Belgian football player and manager
- Johann Boeck (1743–1793), German actor
- Jonas Axel Boeck (1833–1873), Norwegian marine biologist
- Kurt Boeck (1855–1933), German theatre artist, traveller, and writer
- Marcelo Boeck (born 1984), Brazilian professional footballer

== See also ==
- Besnier-Boeck disease or Sarcoidosis, also called sarcoid, is a disease involving abnormal collections of inflammatory cells (granulomas) that can form as nodules in multiple organs
- Het Notite Boeck der Christelyckes Kercke op de Manner of Philips Burgh, rare surviving record book of the Old Dutch Church of Sleepy Hollow in Sleepy Hollow, New York
- Boeckman (disambiguation)
