= Fredskapellet =

Church in Nordland, Norway

- Fredskapellet
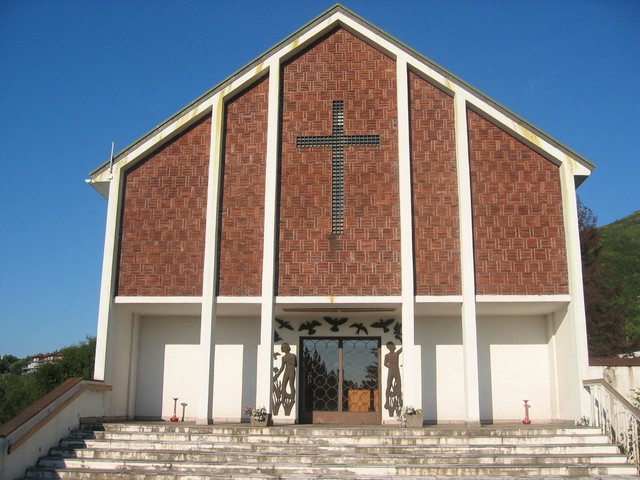
- View of the chapel
- Fredskapellet
- 68.4428694°N 17.4524205°E
- Location: Narvik Municipality, Nordland
- Country: Norway
- Denomination: Church of Norway
- Churchmanship: Evangelical Lutheran

History
- Status: Chapel
- Founded: 1939
- Consecrated: 14 Dec 1957

Architecture
- Functional status: Active
- Architect: Jan Inge Hovig
- Architectural type: Long church
- Completed: 1957 (69 years ago)

Specifications
- Capacity: 250
- Materials: Brick

Administration
- Diocese: Sør-Hålogaland
- Deanery: Ofoten prosti
- Parish: Narvik
- Norwegian Cultural Heritage Site
- Type: Church
- Status: Not protected
- ID: 84194

Fredskapellet (Norwegian: Fredskapellet) is a chapel of the Church of Norway in Narvik Municipality in Nordland county, Norway. It is located in the town of Narvik. It is an annex chapel in the Narvik parish which is part of the Ofoten prosti (deanery) in the Diocese of Sør-Hålogaland. The brick chapel was built in a long church style in 1957 using plans drawn up by the architect Jan Inge Hovig. The chapel seats about 250 people.

== History ==
The first chapel built on this site was completed in 1939 and it was consecrated on 23 March 1939. The chapel was destroyed during World War II in April 1940, about a year after it was completed. The chapel was rebuilt after the war and it was consecrated on 14 December 1957 by the Bishop Wollert Krohn-Hansen. The chapel is located next to the main cemetery for the town of Narvik and therefore the chapel is mostly used for funerals.

== Media gallery ==
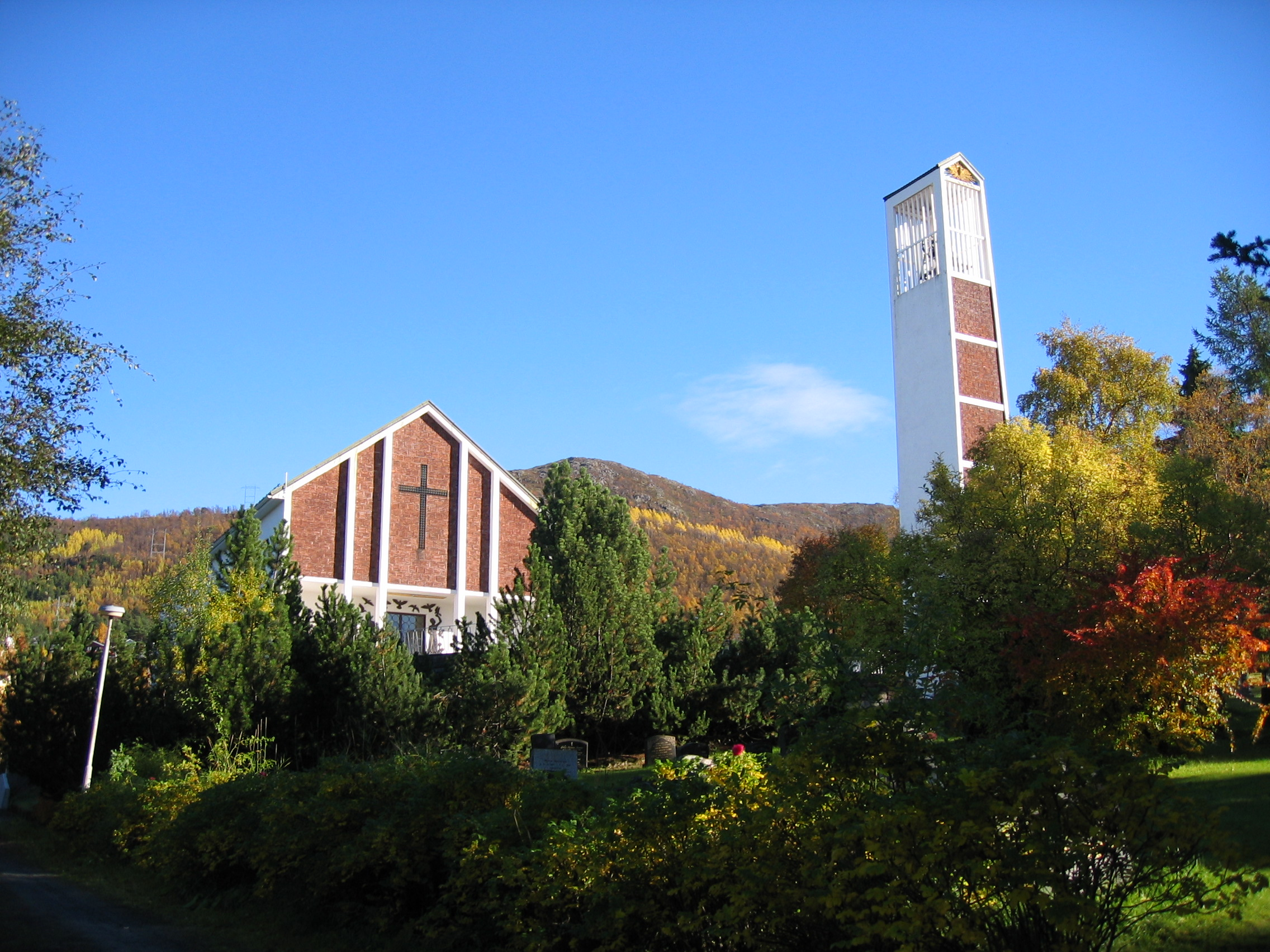

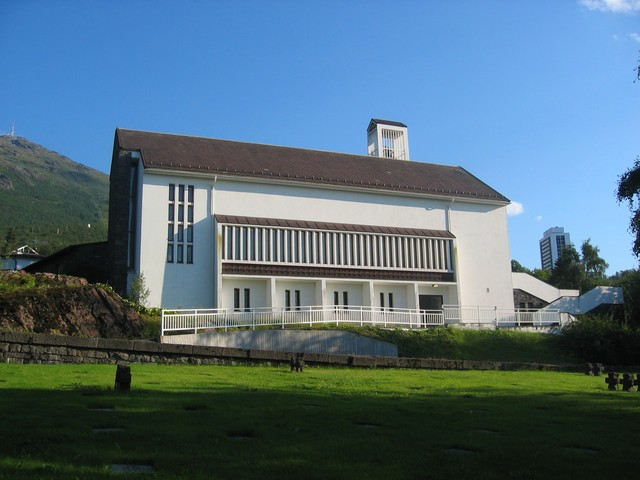

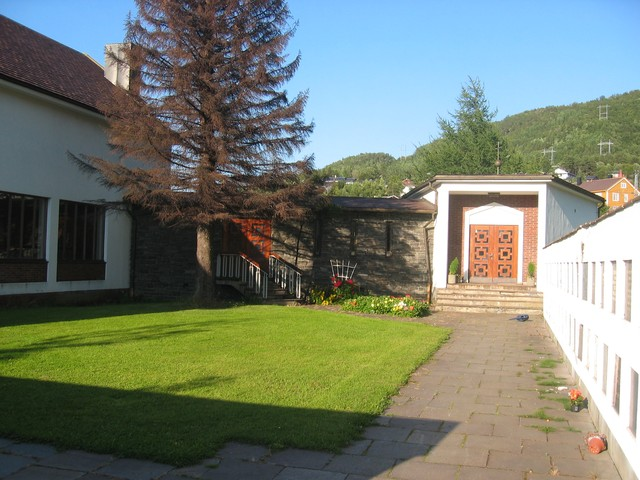

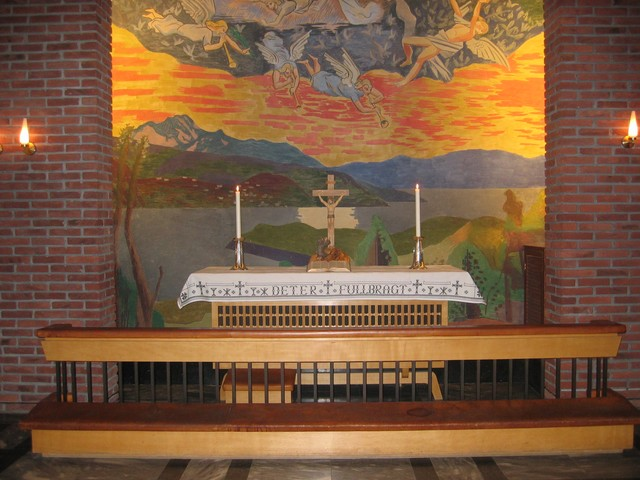

== See also ==
- List of churches in Sør-Hålogaland
