= Mathias Bonsach Krogh =

Norwegian politician

- Bishop
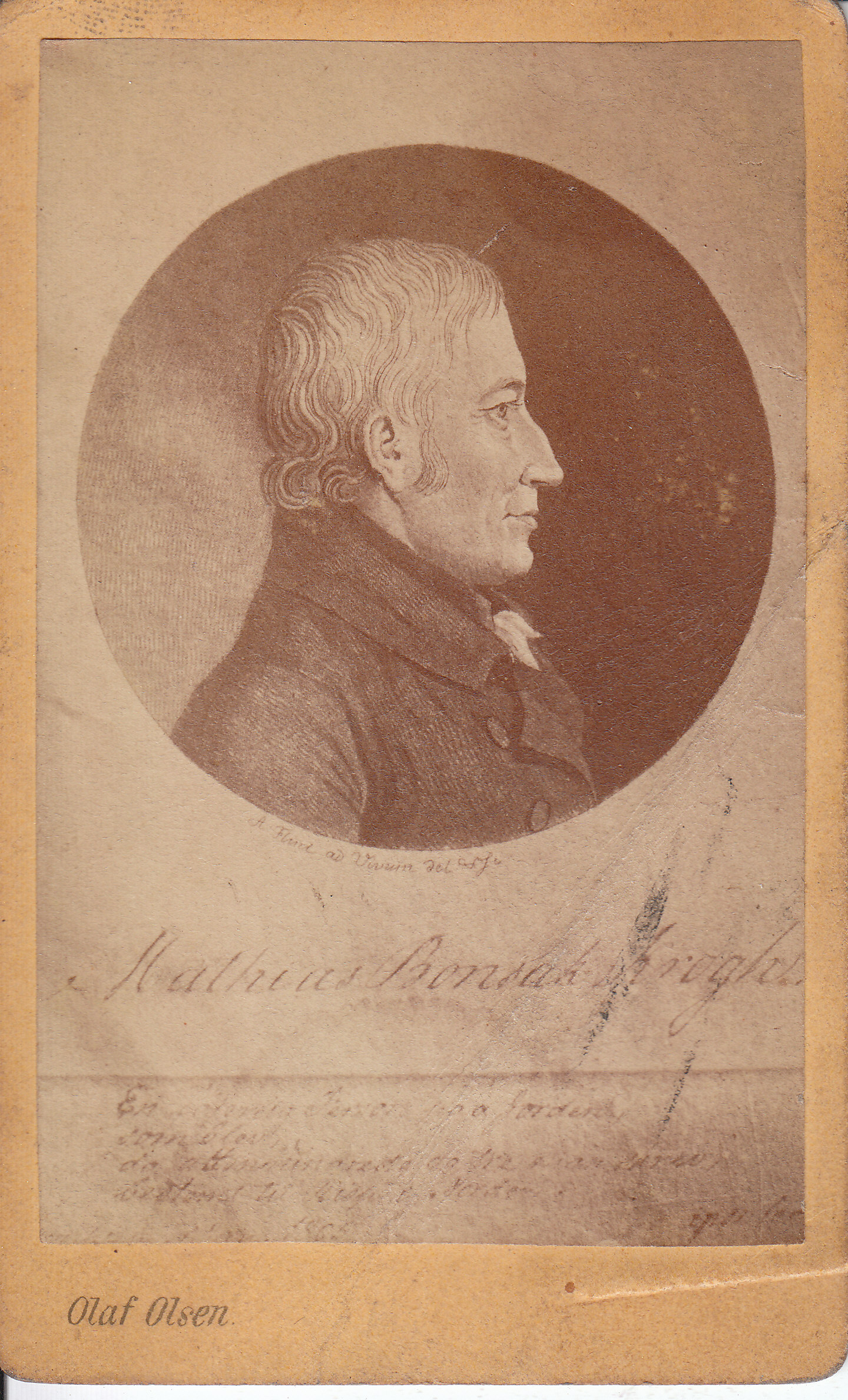
- Church: Church of Norway
- Diocese: Tromsø stift
- Appointed: 6 January 1804
- In office: 1804–1828
- Successor: Peder Christian Hersleb Kjerschow

Personal details
- Born: 4 October 1754 Vadsø, Norway
- Died: 2 September 1828 (aged 73) Alsta, Norway
- Denomination: Christian
- Spouse: Nicoline Antonette Møldrup
- Occupation: Priest, Politician
- Education: Cand.theol.

Mathias Bonsach Krogh (4 October 1754 – 2 September 1828) was a Norwegian clergyman who served as the first Bishop of the Diocese of Hålogaland. Krogh was also a member of the first ordinary Parliament of Norway.

== Biography ==
Krogh was born in Vadsø Municipality in Finnmark county, Norway. He was the son of Truls Krogh and Else Marie, née Bonsach. Krogh was educated at the University of Copenhagen. He received his candidatus theologiæ degree in 1779.

He began his career as the parish priest at Lenvik Church in Troms county, a post he held from 1782 until 1788. From 1788 until 1798, he was the parish priest at Vågan Church in Nordland. Then, from 1798 until 1804, he was the parish priest at Ørland Church in Sør-Trøndelag.

On 6 January 1804, Krogh became the first Bishop of the Diocese of Hålogaland (called Tromsø Stift). Until then, this area had been under the jurisdiction of the Diocese of Nidaros. Krogh moved to Alsta island in Nordland, where he made the Alstahaug Church (Alstahaug kirke) the seat of the diocese. From 1805 until 1812, he served concurrently as parish priest of Alstahaug.

Krogh was elected as a representative to the first ordinary Parliament of Norway in 1815, which followed the 1814 Constitution. He served from 1815 until 1817 representing Northern Norway. His active efforts, also in parliament, contributed to the establishment of Bodø as the first market town in Nordland.

Krogh received the Order of the Dannebrog in 1812 and, when the Danish-Norwegian union was dissolved and Norway entered a union with Sweden, received the Swedish Order of the Polar Star in 1815. Krogh remained bishop until his death in 1828. He was buried at the graveyard at Alstahaug Church.

Church of Norway titles
| New diocese (Split off from the Diocese of Nidaros) | Bishop of Tromsø stift 1804–1828 | Succeeded by Peder Christian Hersleb Kjerschow |
