= Diocese of Hålogaland =

Former diocese of the Church of Norway

Diocese of Hålogaland Hålogaland bispedomme
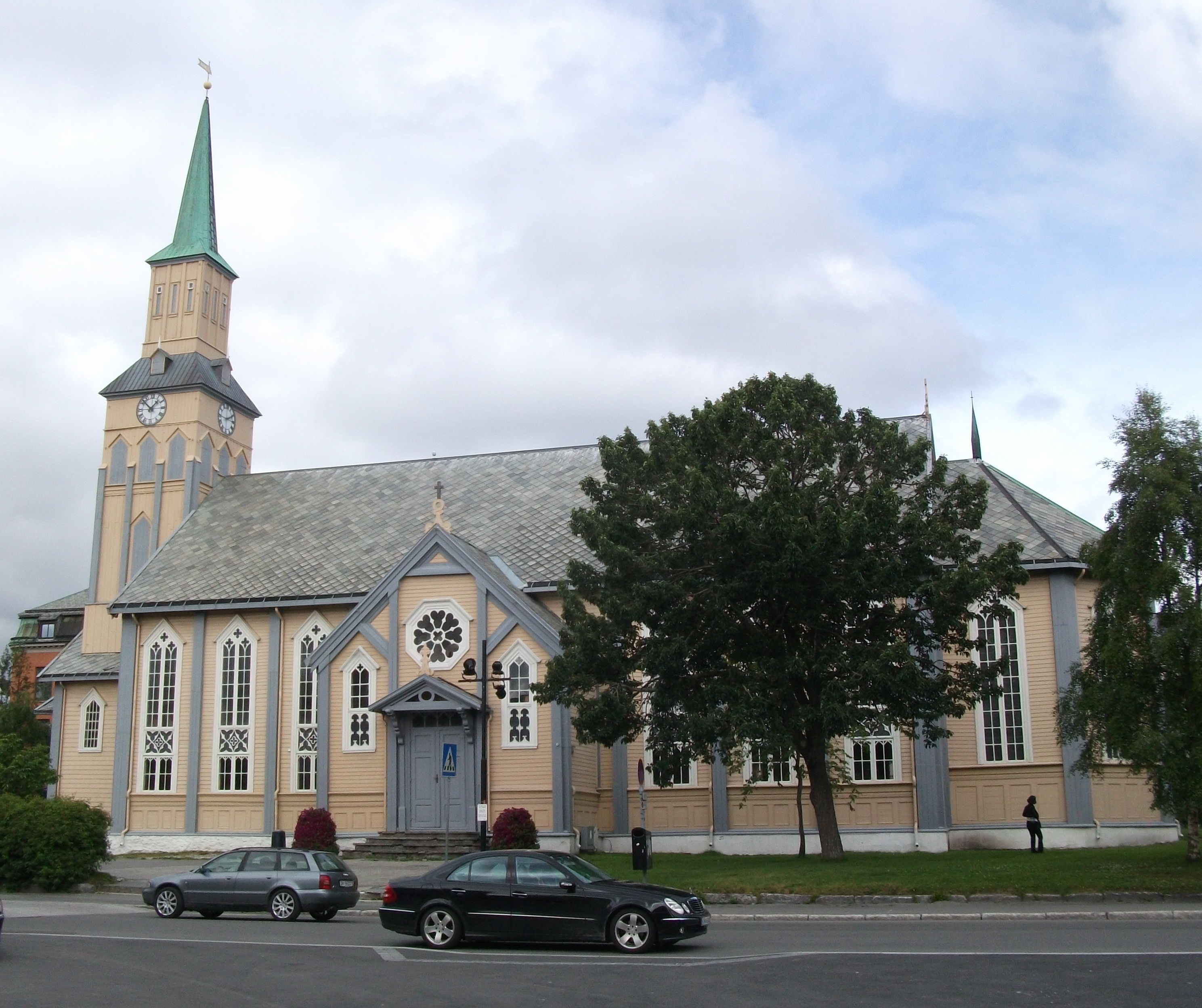
- View of the Tromsø Cathedral

Location
- Country: Norway
- Territory: Nordland, Finnmark, Troms, and Svalbard

Information
- Denomination: Church of Norway
- Established: 1804—1952
- Cathedral: Tromsø Cathedral

Map
- The diocese included the areas of both Nord-Hålogaland and Sør-Hålogaland in the map.

The Diocese of Hålogaland (Norwegian: Hålogaland bispedømme, historically: Tromsø stift) was a diocese in the Church of Norway. The Diocese covered the Lutheran Church of Norway churches located within all of Northern Norway (including Nordland, Troms, and Finnmark county along with the territory of Svalbard). The diocese was headquartered in the city of Tromsø at the Tromsø Cathedral. The diocese was dissolved in 1952 when it was split into the Diocese of Nord-Hålogaland and the Diocese of Sør-Hålogaland.

== History ==
Originally, this area was a part of the great Diocese of Nidaros, which covered all of Norway from Romsdalen north. On 30 December 1803, the King of Norway named Peder Olivarius Bugge the "Bishop of Trondheim and Romsdal" and also named Mathias Bonsach Krogh the "Bishop of Nordland and Finnmark", thus essentially splitting the diocese into two (but legally it was one diocese with two bishops). The new Bishop Krogh made Alstahaug Church the seat of his bishopric in the north, while Bishop Bugge stayed in Trondheim at the Nidaros Cathedral. The new diocese in the north was formally established on 14 June 1844 as Tromsø stift and it was to be seated in the city of Tromsø. Work on a new cathedral was begun soon after. The new Tromsø Cathedral was completed in 1864. The name of the diocese was changed to Hålogaland bispedømme in 1918. In 1952, the Diocese of Hålogaland was split into two: the Diocese of Sør-Hålogaland (which covered Nordland county) and the Diocese of Nord-Hålogaland (which included Troms and Finnmark county and Svalbard).

== Bishops ==
Below is a list of the bishops of Hålogaland during its whole existence.

- 1804-1828: Mathias Bonsach Krogh
- 1830-1848: Peder Christian Hersleb Kjerschow
- 1849-1855: Daniel Bremer Juell
- 1855−1860: Knud Gislesen
- 1861−1867: Carl Peter Parelius Essendrop
- 1868−1876: Fredrik Waldemar Hvoslef
- 1876−1885: Jakob Sverdrup Smitt
- 1885−1892: Johannes Nilssøn Skaar
- 1893−1909: Peter Wilhelm Kreydahl Bøckmann
- 1910−1918: Gustav Dietrichson
- 1918−1928: Johan Støren
- 1928−1937: Eivind Berggrav
- 1937−1939: Sigurd Johan Normann
- 1940−1952: Wollert Krohn-Hansen
