= Asker Seminary =

Teachers' seminary in Norway

Location
- Coordinates: 59°53′18″N 10°27′51″E

Information
- Established: 1834
- Founder: The Asker Parish Priests
- Closed: 1898

Asker Seminary was a teachers' seminary at Bjerke near Tanum.

Tanum is located in Bærum, which then was a part of Asker parish. The seminary was established in 1834 to educate teachers that conformed with the School Act of 1827. The education spanned two years and was free of charge. The first manager of the seminary was Knud Gislesen from 1834 to 1855, later a bishop. Several of the seminary's alumni became clergymen, politicians, academics or artists.

In 1898, the school itself moved to Holmestrand and became Holmestrand Seminar.

The building was occupied by a girls' school afterward, and is now home to a child and adolescent psychiatric facility, referred to as Bjerketun.

== Notable alumni ==
- Helga Eng (1875–1966), educationalist and psychologist
