= Bjarne Odd Weider =

Norwegian bishop (1913–1985)

Personal details
- Born: 17 June 1913 Trondheim, Norway
- Died: 17 August 1985 (aged 72) Norway
- Denomination: Church of Norway
- Occupation: Priest
- Education: Cand.theol.
- Alma mater: MF Norwegian School of Theology

Bjarne Odd Weider (1913—1985) was the Bishop of the Diocese of Sør-Hålogaland from 1969 until 1982.

Weider was born on 17 June 1913 in Trondheim, Norway. He received his Cand.theol. degree in 1936 from the MF Norwegian School of Theology in Oslo. For several years he worked for the Norwegian Missionary Society. He was a parish priest in Hurdal from 1955 until 1961. He was the rector at the MF Norwegian School of Theology from 1961 until 1969. In 1969 he was appointed bishop of the Diocese of Sør-Hålogaland. He held that post until his retirement in 1982.

His son is the priest Bjarne Olaf Weider.

== Works ==
Weider has written several books including:

- Søndagens evangelium, 1979
- Fortolkning av Tessalonikerbrevene, 1978
- Kallet og tjenesten, 1969
- Troens ja, 1966
- I den Høyestes tjeneste, 1956

Church of Norway titles
Preceded by Hans Edvard Wisløff	Bishop of Sør-Hålogaland; 1969–1982	Succeeded by Fredrik Grønningsæter
