= Sigurd Johan Normann =

- Diocese of Hålogaland
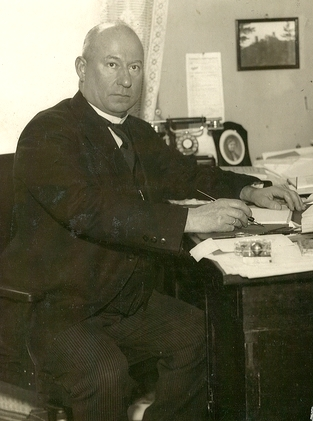
- In office: 1937—1939

Personal details
- Born: 22 August 1879 Hamarøy, Norway
- Died: 4 December 1939 (aged 60) Tromsø, Norway
- Denomination: Church of Norway
- Occupation: Priest
- Education: Cand.theol., Dr. Theol.
- Alma mater: University of Oslo
- Years active: 1909—1939

Sigurd Johan Normann (1879—1939) was a Norwegian theologian and bishop of the Church of Norway. He was the Bishop for the Diocese of Hålogaland from 1937 until his death in 1939.

Normann was born in 1879 in Hamarøy Municipality, Norway. He received his cand.theol. degree in 1909 from the Faculty of Theology at the University of Oslo. He received his Doctor of Theology degree in 1935. He worked as a priest at the Johannes Church in Oslo from 1911 until 1918. From 1918 until 1937, he was the priest for the Grønland Church in Oslo. In 1937, he was named the Bishop of the Diocese of Hålogaland, based in Tromsø, a position he held until his death in December 1939.

Church of Norway titles
Preceded by Eivind Berggrav	Bishop of Hålogaland; 1937–1939	Succeeded by Wollert Krohn-Hansen
