= Peder Christian Hersleb Kjerschow =

Norwegian clergyman

The Right Reverend Peder Christian Hersleb Kjerschow
- Bishop of Bjørgvin
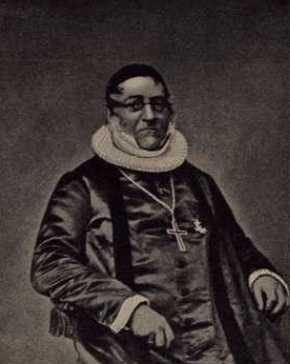
- Church: Church of Norway
- Diocese: Tromsø stift (1830–1848); Bjørgvin (1848–1857)
- In office: 1830–1857

Personal details
- Born: 29 June 1786
- Died: 24 November 1866 (aged 80)
- Denomination: Christian
- Spouse: Johanne Benedicte Collett
- Children: Christian Collett Kjerschow
- Occupation: Priest
- Education: Cand.theol.

Peder Christian Hersleb Kjerschow (29 June 1786 – 24 November 1866) was a Norwegian clergyman.

== Biography ==
He was born at Rødøy in Nordland, Norway. He was the son of the Danish-born priest Rasmus Sundt Christensen Kjerschow (1739–1806) and his wife Benedicte Maria Pedersdatter Hersleb (born 1744). His father was a vicar in Brønnøysund, who had migrated to Norway from Jutland. He was a student at Trondheim Cathedral School and earned his cand.theol. in 1808.

From 1814, he was a resident chaplain in Aker Prestegjeld, where he served under parish priest Claus Pavels (1769–1822). In 1823, he became a parish priest in Aker. In 1830, he was added as the second bishop of the Diocese of Tromsø. He was a bishop in the Church of Norway for twenty-seven years; first in Tromsø from 1830 to 1848 and later in the Diocese of Bjørgvin from 1848 to 1857.

== Personal life ==
Peder Kjerschow married Johanne Benedicte Collett (1802–1851), daughter of mining director Christian Ancher Collett and cousin of Peter Jonas and Johan Christian Collett. They had seven children of which two died young. Their son Christian Collett Kjerschow became a County Governor, while their daughter married businessman Jacob Andreas Michelsen. His grandson Peter Christian Hersleb Kjerschow Michelsen was named after him, but is better known as Christian Michelsen, statesman and prime minister.

Church of Norway titles
Preceded by Mathias Bonsach Krogh	Bishop of Tromsø stift 1830–1848	Succeeded by Daniel Bremer Juell
Preceded by Jacob Neumann	Bishop of Bjørgvin; 1848–1857	Succeeded by Jens Mathias Pram Kaurin
