= Daniel Bremer Juell =

Norwegian politician

- Bishop
- Church: Church of Norway
- Diocese: Tromsø stift
- In office: 1849–1855
- Other posts: Member of the Storting (1839–1841, 1845–1850)

Personal details
- Born: 1 January 1808 Siljord, Norway
- Died: 26 May 1855 (aged 47) Hamburg, Germany
- Buried: Christiania, Norway
- Denomination: Christian
- Parents: Ole Juell; Caroline Kathrine Bremer
- Spouse: Caroline Boeck
- Occupation: Priest
- Education: Cand. theol. (1831)

Daniel Bremer Juell (1 January 1808 – 26 May 1855) was a Norwegian clergyman and politician.

== Personal life ==
Daniel Bremer Juell was born in Siljord in 1808 to district stipendiary magistrate (sorenskriver) Ole Juell and his wife Caroline Kathrine née Bremer. He married Caroline Boeck, daughter of captain Cæsar Boeck. They had three children.

== Career ==
Juell enrolled as a student in 1826 and graduated in 1831. In 1836 he was appointed catechism teacher in Kragerø. While stationed here he was elected to the Norwegian Parliament in 1839 and 1845. In 1845 he was appointed vicar in Porsgrund, replacing Ole Hersted Schjøtt who moved to Skien. In 1848 he was elected for a third time to the Norwegian Parliament. He represented the constituency of Porsgrund og Brevik. He left Porsgrund in 1849 to become bishop of the Diocese of Tromsø. He died in Hamburg in 1855, en route to Carlsbad. He was buried in Christiania.

Religious titles
Preceded by Peder Kjerschow	Bishop of Tromsø stift 1849–1855	Succeeded by Knud Gislesen
