= Hans Gaas =

Danish-Norwegian clergyman

Hans Gaas ( c.1500 – 17 September 1578) was a Danish-Norwegian clergyman. He was Bishop of the Diocese of Nidaros in the aftermath of the introduction of Lutheranism into Norway.

Gaas was born in Svendborg on the island of Funen in Denmark. He studied in Wittenberg for a few years from 1521. He took his magister degree in theology at Copenhagen during 1548. He was sent to Trondheim in 1549 with the goal of completing the Reformation of the church in the Diocese of Nidaros. When he first came to Trondheim, he was initially assigned to the Cloister at Elgeseter where he initiated reform. He also undertook a rescue mission for Nidaros Cathedral which was badly damaged by fires in 1327 and again in 1531. In his efforts to initiate reform of the church, he found an ally in Gjeble Pederssøn (ca. 1490–1557) Bishop in Bergen stift, who in 1537 had become the first Lutheran Bishop within Norway. Pederssøn was likewise reforming the church in Bergen.

Hans Gaas served as superintendent and Bishop in Trondhjems stift from 1549 until his death in 1578, except for the war period from 1564 to 1570. In 1563, the Northern Seven Years' War was initiated between Sweden and Denmark-Norway. In 1564, Swedish forces occupied Trøndelag, including the city of Trondheim. Gaas refused taking the oath to the king of Sweden and was imprisoned. The war ended in 1570 with the withdrawal of Swedish forces under terms of the Treaty of Stettin at which time Gaas was reinstated in his former office.

Church of Norway titles
Preceded by Torbjørn Bratt	Bishop of Trondhjem; 1549–1578	Succeeded by Hans Mogenssøn
