= Jens Matthias Pram Kaurin =

Norwegian Lutheran bishop and theologian (1804–1863)

The Right Reverend Jens Mathias Pram Kaurin
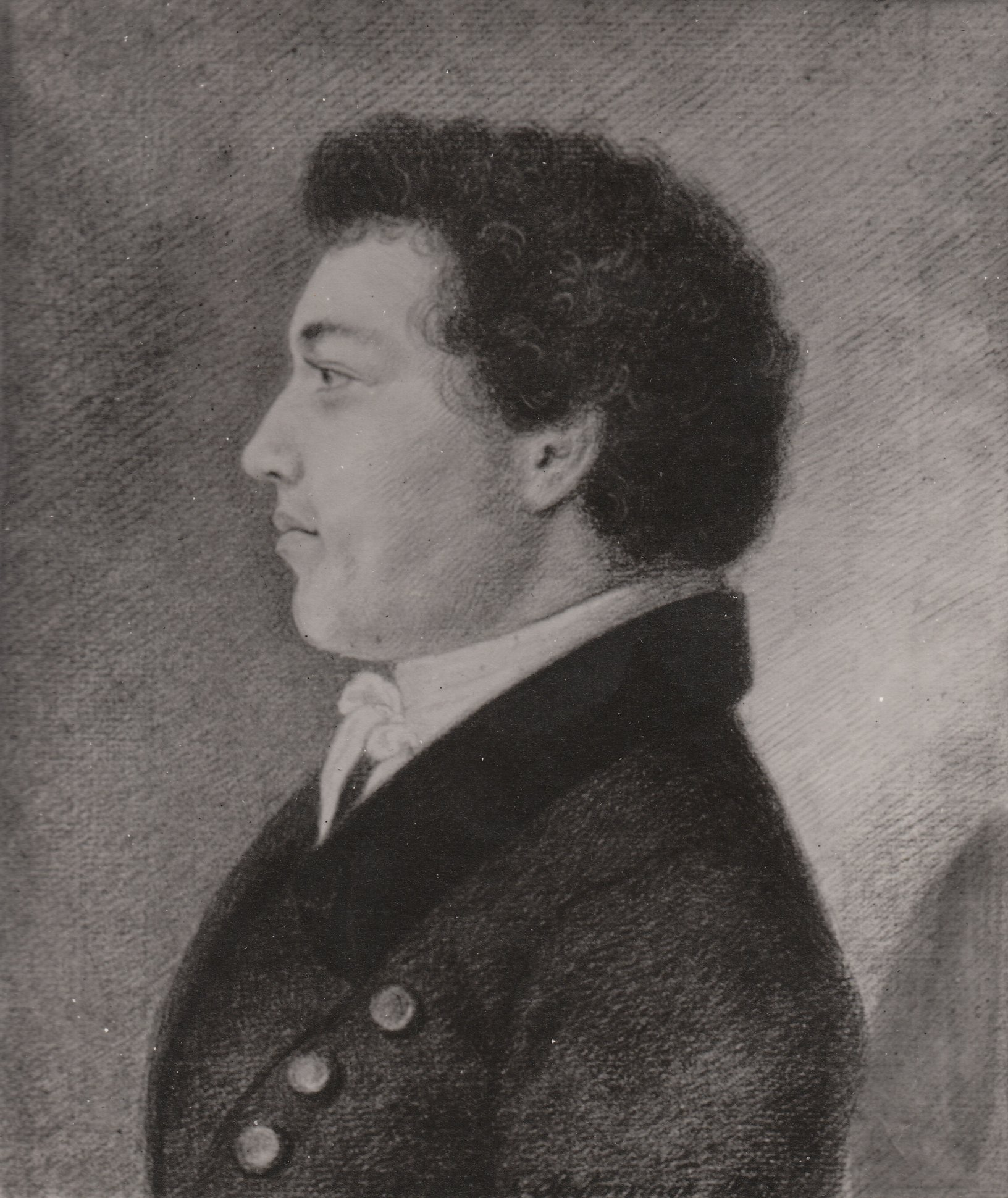
- Jens Mathias Pram Kaurin

Personal details
- Born: 25 November 1804 Laurdal, Norway
- Died: 6 July 1863 (aged 58) Vestre Aker, Norway
- Denomination: Church of Norway
- Occupation: Priest
- Education: Cand.theol.; Christiania University

Jens Matthias Pram Kaurin (25 November 1804 – 6 July 1863) was a Norwegian professor of theology, biblical translator, and Lutheran priest. He served as the Bishop of the Diocese of Bjørgvin from 1858 until 1861.

== Life and family ==
Jens Kaurin was born in Laurdal prestegjeld in Telemark county, Norway. He studied theology at Christiania University and graduated with a Cand.theol. degree in 1826. On 22 December 1827, he married Petronelle Louise Hanna Thomasine Magelssen, and together, they had six children: Eiler Rosenvinge, Anne Marie, Christian, Wilhelm Andreas, Edvard, and Susanna Kristence Pram.

== Career ==
In 1837, Kaurin was hired as a lecturer at Christiania University and he served in that capacity until 1843 when he was appointed as a professor of theology. In 1853, he resigned his job at the university to begin working as a priest at Lier Municipality in Buskerud county. He worked in Lier until 1858 when he was appointed Bishop of the Diocese of Bjørgvin, based in Bergen. He served as bishop from 1858 to 1861 when he was forced to resign due to poor health.

Among Kaurin's works were significant contribution to a new and controversial edition of Pontoppidans forklaring, and participation in a new translation of the Old Testament into the Norwegian language.

After resigning as bishop, Kaurin moved to Vestre Aker, just outside Christiania and lived for two more years there before his death on 6 July 1863.

Church of Norway titles
| Preceded by Peder Christian Hersleb Kjerschow | Bishop of Bjørgvin; 1858–1863 | Succeeded by Peter Hersleb Graah Birkeland |
