= Helga Eng =

Norwegian psychologist and educationalist (1875–1966)

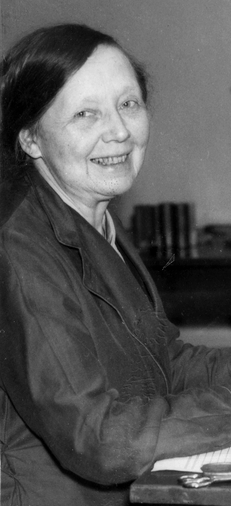
- Eng c. 1930
- Born: Helga Kristine Eng; 31 May 1875; Rakkestad, Norway
- Died: May 26, 1966 (aged 90); Oslo, Norway
- Education: Asker Seminary (1895)
- Occupations: Educationalist; phsychologist

Helga Kristine Eng (31 May 1875 – 26 May 1966) was a Norwegian psychologist and educationalist. She was the third woman to receive a doctor's degree in Norway, and the first to do so in psychology.

== Early life and education ==
She was born in Rakkestad on 31 May 1875 as a daughter of teacher and smallholder Hans Andersen Kirkeng (1838–1898) and Johanne Marie Sæves (1843–1886). She had seven siblings. She graduated from Asker Seminary in 1895, and started a career as a primary school teacher. She started in Lier, continued in Moss from 1897 to 1900 when she was hired at Lakkegata School at Tøyen, Oslo.

She also continued her own education as a private candidate, finished middle school in 1897, secondary school in 1903 and ex.phil. in 1904. She studied psychology, which at that time sorted under philosophy and did not have a master's degree.

== Publications and views ==
After a stay in Halle under the auspices of Ernst Meumann from 1909 to 1910, she began on a doctorate thesis, finishing it in 1912. It was named Abstrakte begreper i barnets tanke og tale ("Abstract Terms in Thought and Speech of Children"), and she disputed for the dr.philos. degree in January 1913, becoming the third Norwegian woman with a doctorate. The thesis was translated to German and printed in Zeitschrift für angewandte Psychologie in 1914. She studied in Germany again, under Meumann and Wilhelm Wundt, and also travelled to study in Italy, the Netherlands and Switzerland. Although formally appointed as teacher until 1935, she was granted continuous study leaves from 1916, and never returned to teaching.

Her next book was Nutidspædagogik. Kunstpædagogik, which is still perceived as a modern educational work. She was also an empiricist in education improvement, and popularized her and others' research for the general public. She was not a positivist however; she called her own outlook on life "universal, realistic humanism". In the 1920s she again studied more pure psychology, issuing Barnets følelsesliv i sammenligning med den voksnes in 1921. In 1926 she issued Barnetegning, in which she followed her niece's child drawing skills from the age of 10 months to 8 years. She followed in 1944 with Margretes tegning, describing her niece's drawing skills from age 9 to 24.

== Career ==
She worked as a psychologist in Oslo Municipality from 1925, involving herself mostly with psychological testing and psychotechnique. She was a lecturer at Oslo Teachers' College from 1922 to 1927 and 1932 to 1936, and at the Royal Frederick University from 1932. From 1926 she was a fellow of the Norwegian Academy of Science and Letters. On 1 January 1938 she started her tenure as a professor at the Royal Frederick University (from 1939 the University of Oslo), building up the Department of Educational Research. She formally should have retired in 1940 when reaching the age limit, but continued to 1948.

== Death and legacy ==
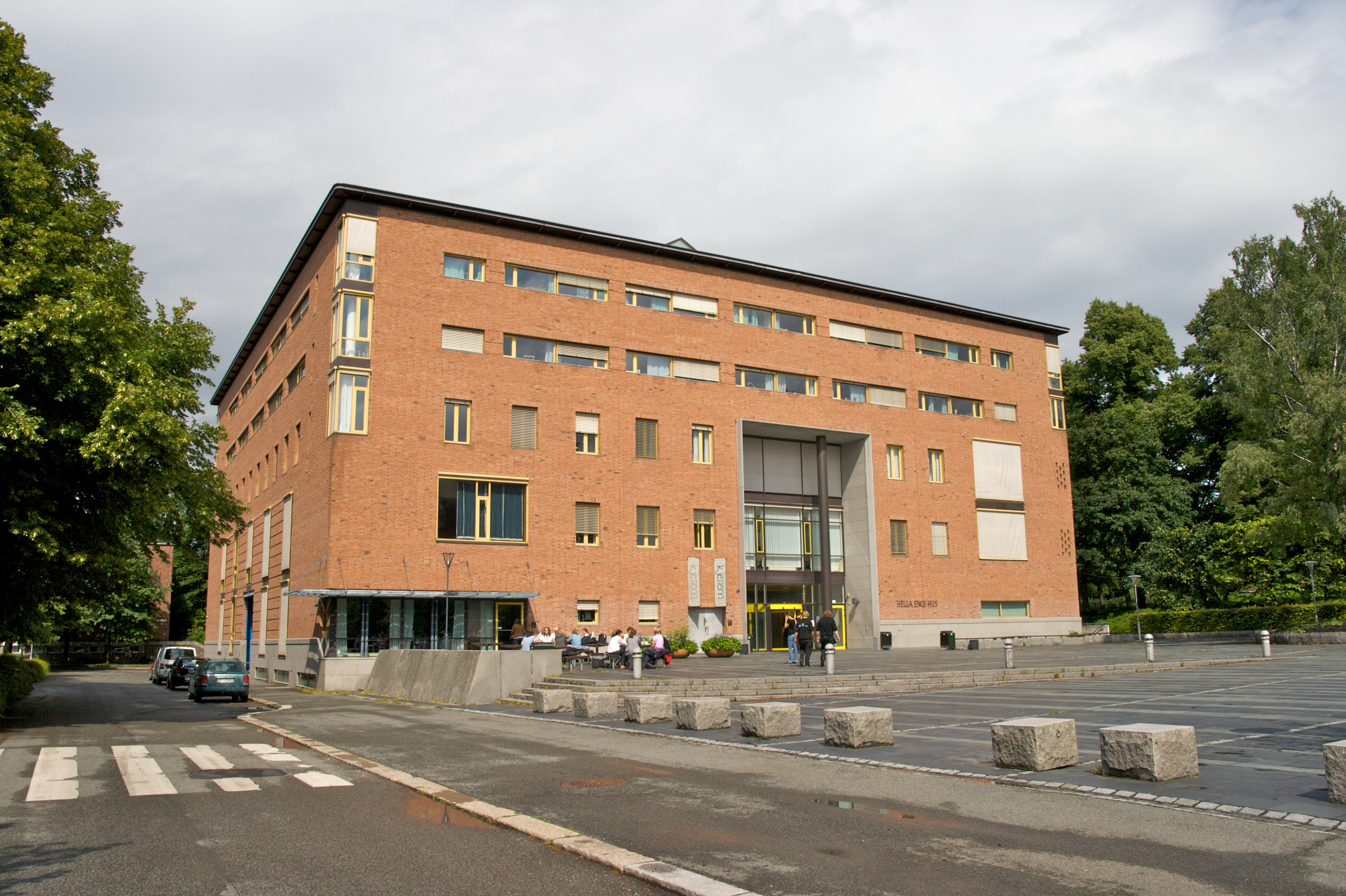
The current Helga Eng House.

She died on 26 May 1966 in Oslo. She was decorated as a Knight, First Class of the Order of St. Olav (1953), and in 1994 when the Faculty of Educational Sciences' new building at the University of Oslo campus Blindern was inaugurated, it was named the Helga Eng House.
