= Gustav Dietrichson =

Norwegian priest (1855–1922)

Gustav Johan Fredrik Dietrichson

Personal details
- Born: 8 April 1855 Wisconsin, United States
- Died: 19 March 1922 (aged 66) Hamar, Norway
- Denomination: Church of Norway
- Occupation: Priest
- Education: University of Oslo (Cand.theol.)
- Years active: 1878—1922

Gustav Johan Fredrik Dietrichson (8 April 1855 – 19 March 1922) was a Norwegian theologian and priest. He served as bishop of both the Diocese of Hålogaland and the Diocese of Hamar.

Dietrichson was born in the state of Wisconsin. His parents, Gustav Fredrik Dietrichson (1813–1886) and Pauline Christine Sørine Alette Henriette Preus (1819–1900) were Norwegian immigrants to the United States. He came for a clerical family. His maternal uncle, Adolph Carl Preus (1814–1878), had immigrated from Norway in 1850. Preus served as the first President of the Norwegian Synod prior to returning to Norway in 1870 where he served as vicar in Tvedestrand Municipality and Holt Municipality in Aust-Agder until his death.

Dietrichson himself moved to Norway where he received his Cand.theol. degree from the University of Oslo in 1878. He was the parish priest in Stor-Elvdal Municipality from 1887 until 1897 and in Bodø Municipality from 1897 until 1910. In 1910, he was named Bishop of Tromsø stift. The name was changed to the "Diocese of Hålogaland" in 1918. Later in 1918, he became the new bishop for the Diocese of Hamar, the position he held until his death in 1922 in Hamar.

Church of Norway titles
Preceded by Peter Wilhelm K. Bøckman	Bishop of Tromsø; 1910–1918	Succeeded by Johan Støren
Preceded by Otto Jensen	Bishop of Hamar; 1918–1922	Succeeded by Mikkel Bjønness-Jacobsen
