= Knud Gislesen =

Norwegian teacher, clergyman and author

- Bishop
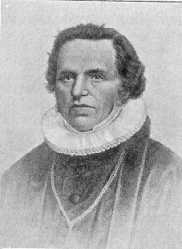
- Church: Church of Norway
- Diocese: Tromsø stift
- Appointed: 1856
- In office: 1856–60

Personal details
- Born: 29 December 1801 Hjartdal, Norway
- Died: 20 May 1860 (aged 58) Tromsø, Norway
- Denomination: Christian
- Spouse: Henriette Gislesen
- Occupation: Priest
- Education: University of Oslo (Cand.theol., 1930)

Knud Gislesen (29 December 1801 – 20 May 1860) was a Norwegian teacher, clergyman and author. He served as Bishop of the Tromsø from 1856 until his death in 1860.

== Biography ==
Gislesen was born at Løxlie in Hjartdal prestegjeld in Telemark, Norway. He moved to Oslo in 1825 to pursue his education at the University of Oslo. He received his cand.theol. degree in 1830. His first job was as a teacher at the school in Skien in 1831. He took a position as chaplain at Asker Church in 1833. In 1834, he was named the head of the Asker Seminary. In 1855 he became a vicar in Gjerpen Church, and then in May 1856 he was named as Bishop of the Diocese of Tromsø. He remained there until his death in 1860.

During his time at the Asker seminary, he wrote a Biblical history book in 1853. A revised and expanded version was published in 1858. In March 1854, he married Henriette Gislesen (1809–1859) who was a noted author. He received the Order of Vasa in 1843 and the Order of St. Olav in 1858.

Religious titles
| Preceded by Daniel Bremer Juell | Bishop of Tromsø stift 1856–1860 | Succeeded by Carl Essendrop |
