= Boeckmann =

Boeckmann or Böckmann is a German surname. Notable people with the surname include:

- Alan L. Boeckmann, American businessman
- Carl L. Boeckmann (1867–1923), Norwegian-American artist
- Christine Böckmann (born 1955), German mathematician
- Dee Boeckmann (1906–1989), American middle-distance runner
- Eduard Boeckmann (1849–1927), Norwegian American ophthalmologist, physician and inventor
- Gerd Böckmann (born 1944), German actor
- Herbert von Boeckmann (1886–1974), German general during World War II
- Marcus Olaus Bockman (1849–1942), Norwegian-American Lutheran theologian
- Udo Böckmann (born 1952), German footballer
- Rudolf Boeckmann (1895–1944), German military officer
- Vernon R. Boeckmann (1927–2016), American politician
- Wilhelm Böckmann (1832–1902), German architect

== See also ==
- Herbert von Böckmann (1886–1974), German general
