= Harstad Church =

- Harstad kirke
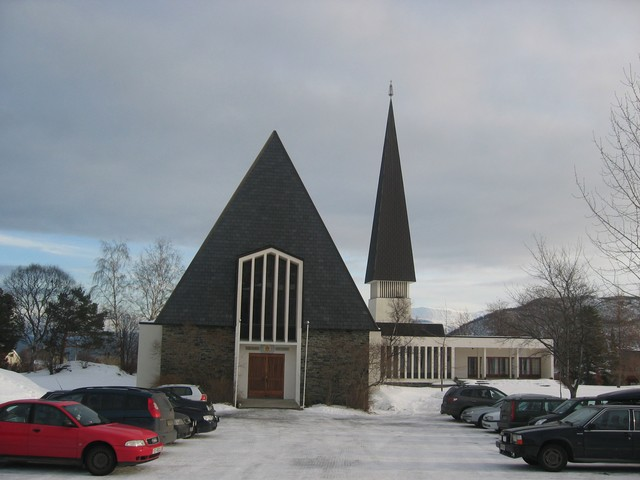
- View of the church
- Harstad Church
- 68.802099°N 16.5357703°E
- Location: Harstad Municipality, Troms
- Country: Norway
- Denomination: Church of Norway
- Churchmanship: Evangelical Lutheran

History
- Status: Parish church
- Founded: 1958
- Consecrated: 3 Aug 1958

Architecture
- Functional status: Active
- Architect: Jan Inge Hovig
- Architectural type: Long church
- Completed: 1958 (68 years ago)

Specifications
- Capacity: 600
- Materials: Concrete

Administration
- Diocese: Nord-Hålogaland
- Deanery: Trondenes prosti
- Parish: Harstad
- Norwegian Cultural Heritage Site
- Type: Church
- Status: Listed
- ID: 84486

Harstad Church (Norwegian: Harstad kirke) is a parish church of the Church of Norway in Harstad Municipality in Troms county, Norway. It is located in the town of Harstad. It is the church for the Harstad parish which is part of the Trondenes prosti (deanery) in the Diocese of Nord-Hålogaland. The white, concrete church was built in a long church style in 1958 using plans drawn up by the architect Jan Inge Hovig. The church seats about 600 people.

== History ==
Planning for a church for the town of Harstad began in the early 20th century, but it took more than 50 years before this dream was realized. Prior to this, the nearby Trondenes Church served the growing town of Harstad. In 1939, a major reconstruction effort began on the Trondenes Church and during that time the church was closed. The people of Harstad had to worship in a small chapel in Harstad for some time. After World War II, planning for a new church in Harstad intensified. In 1953, Sigurd Bjørhovde was hired as the architect for the new church, but it did not work out and then the nationally known architect Jan Inge Hovig was given the job. The church he designed was one of the first arbeidskirker ("working churches") in Norway. This type of church is a more modern church that includes a church hall, office, kitchen, and bathrooms as opposed to the traditional one-room churches that were built for centuries in Norway. The new church was completed in 1958 and it was consecrated on 3 August 1958 by the Bishop Alf Wiig.

== Media gallery ==
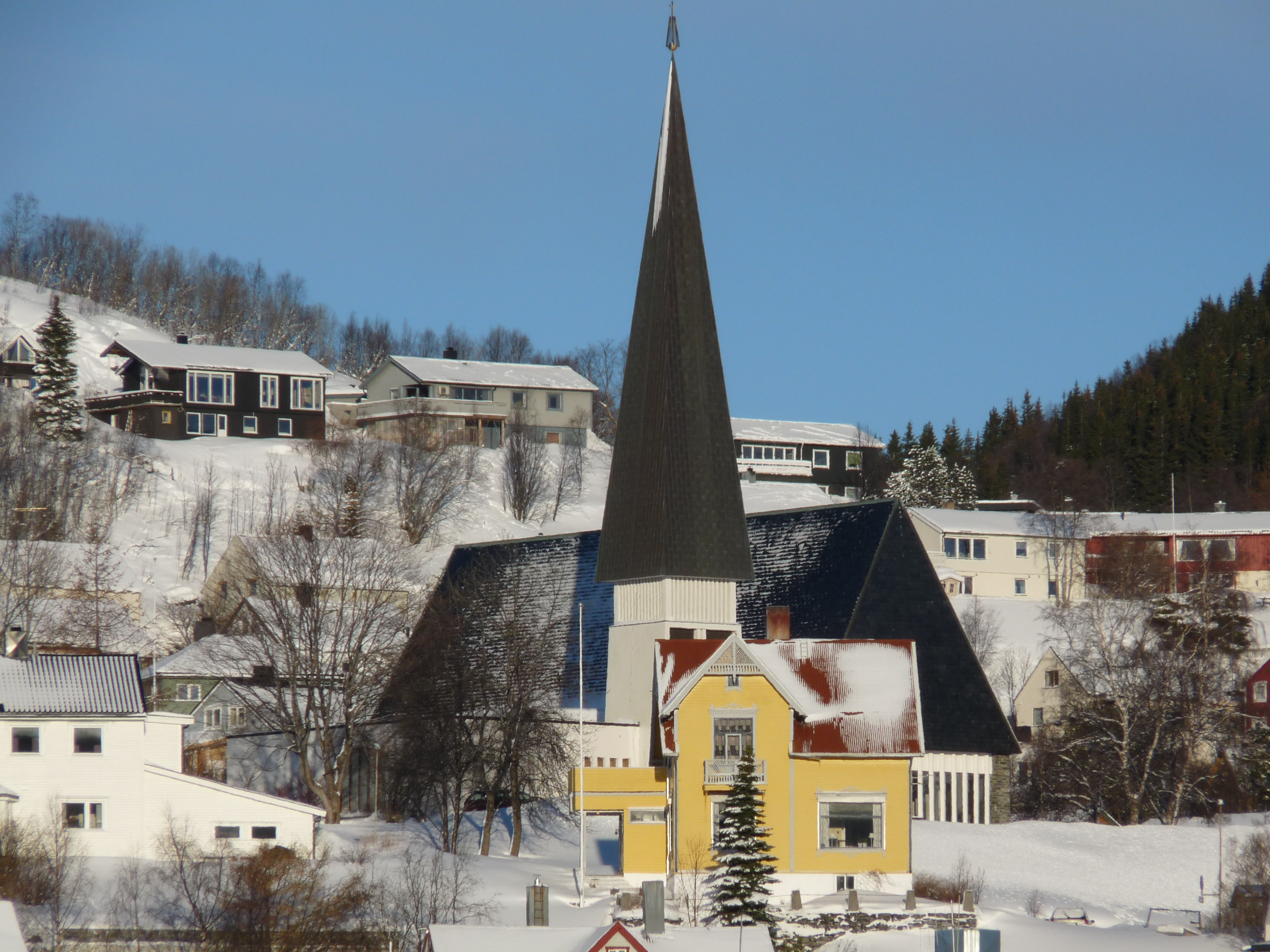

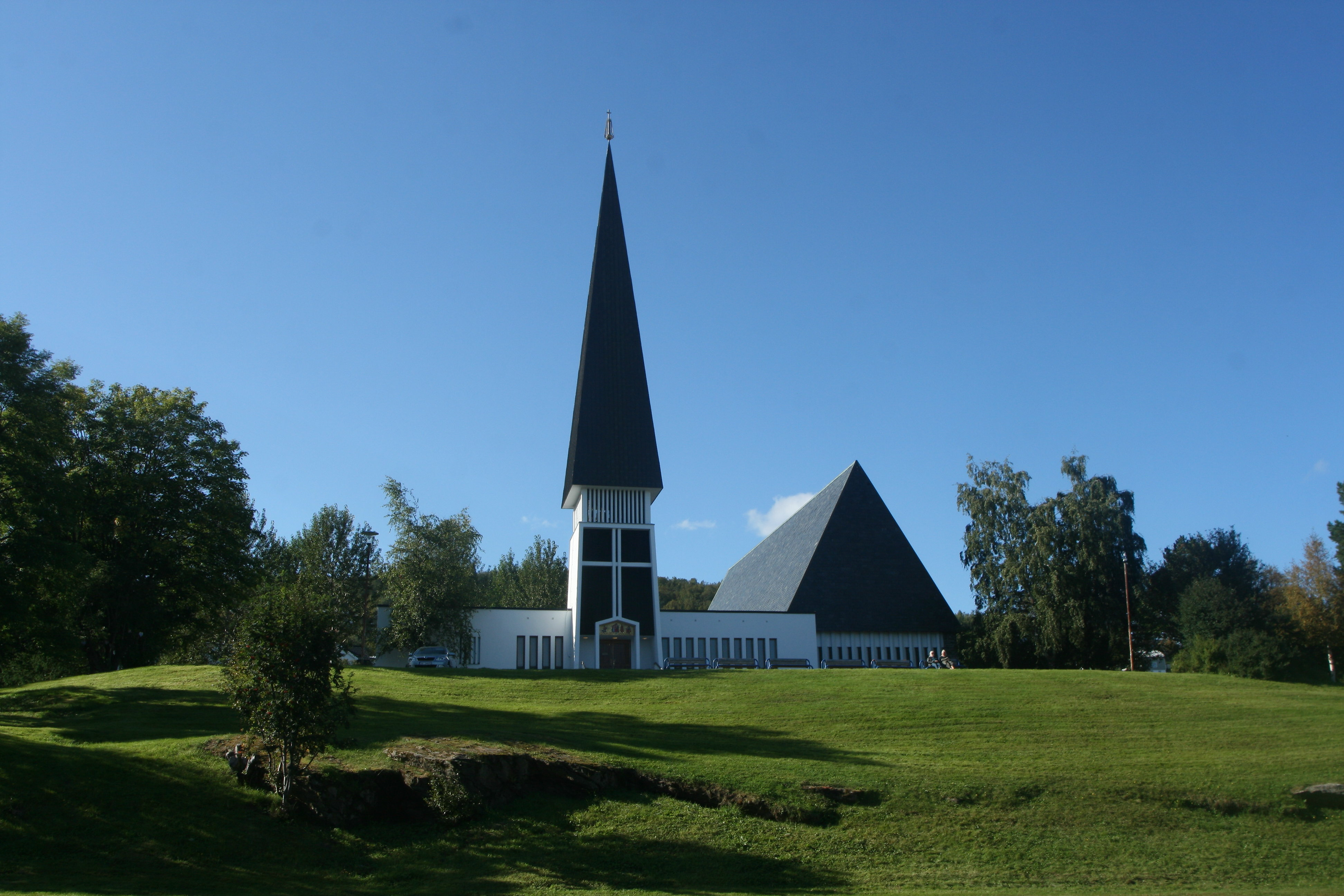

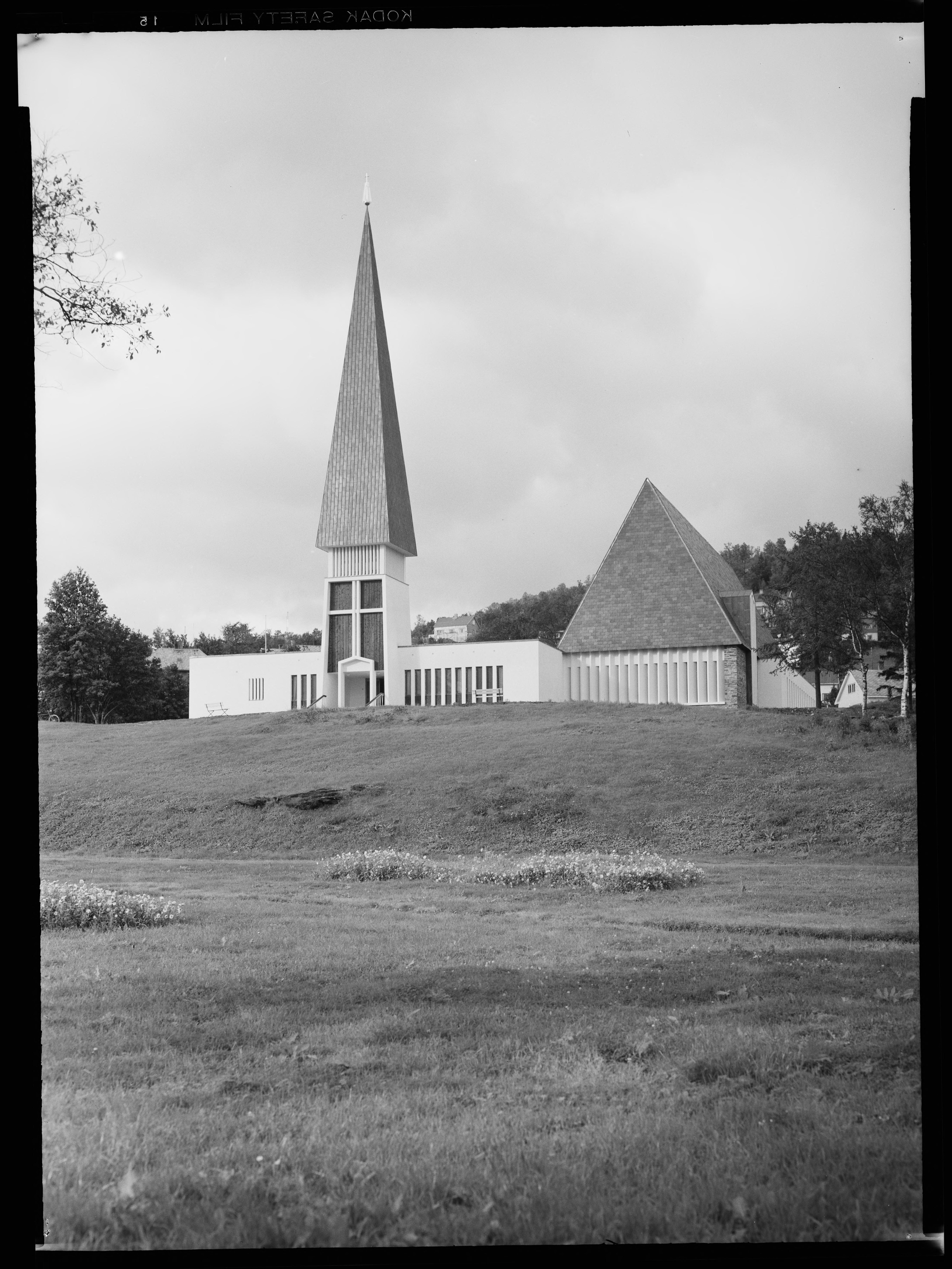

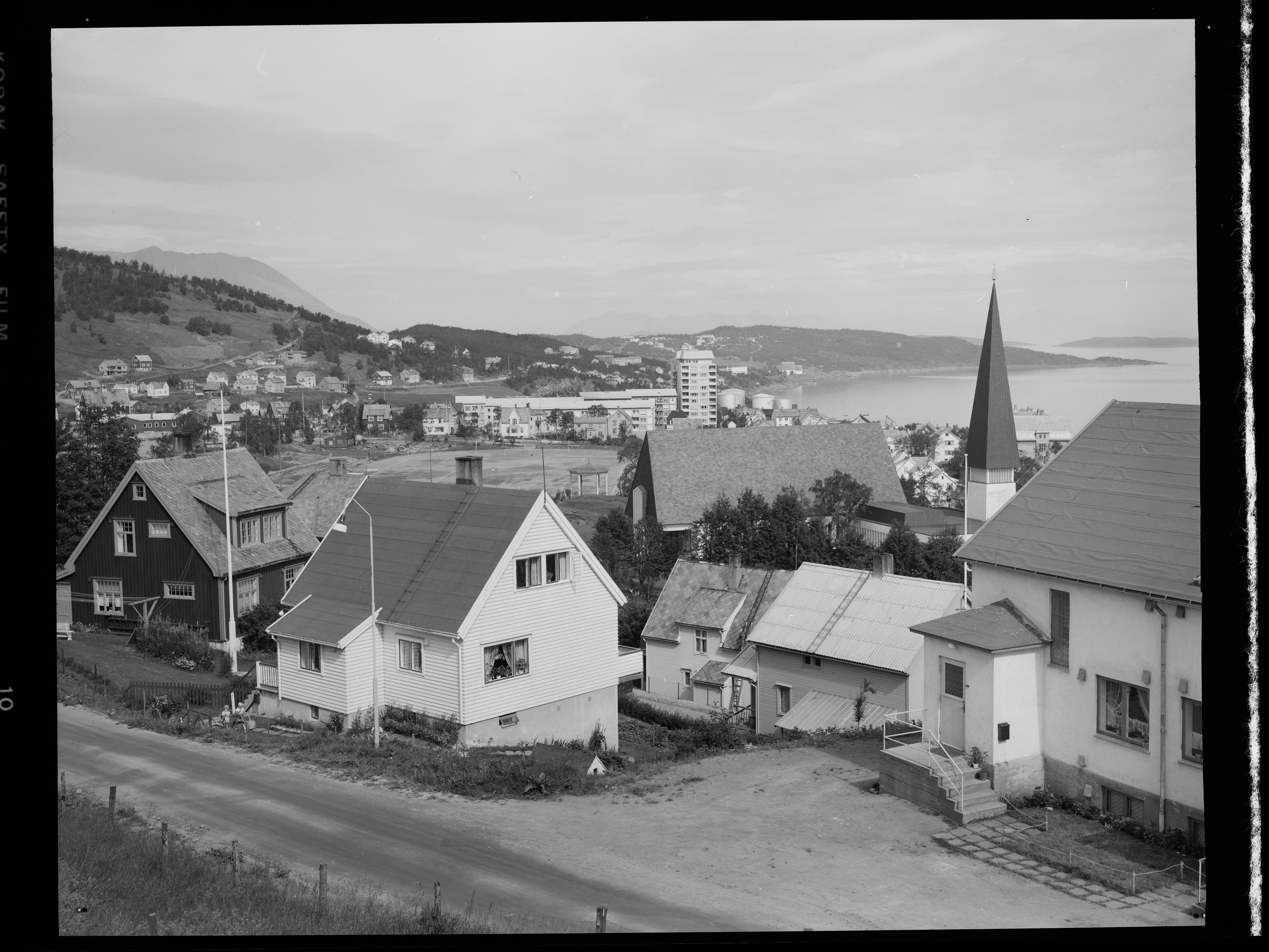

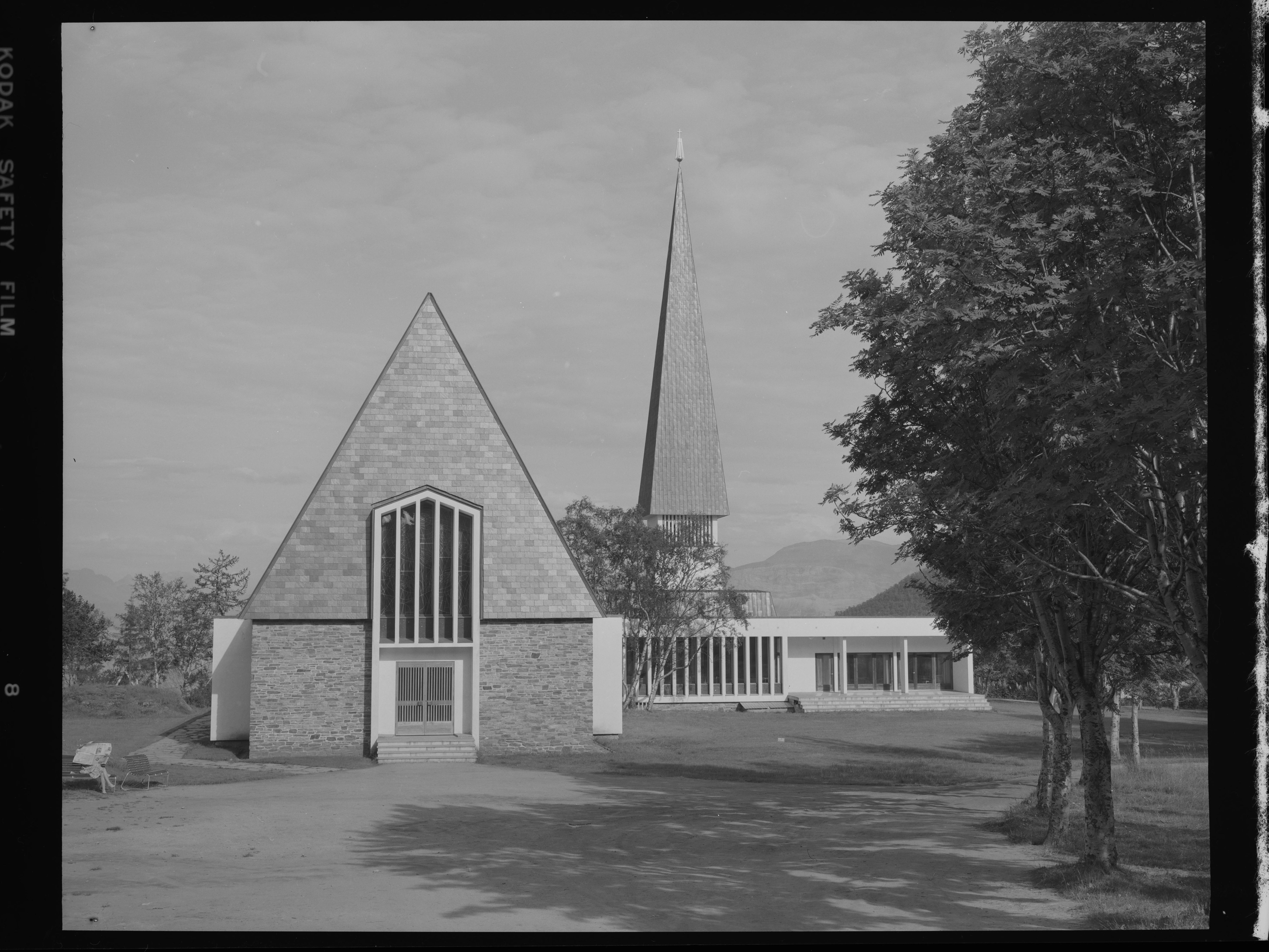

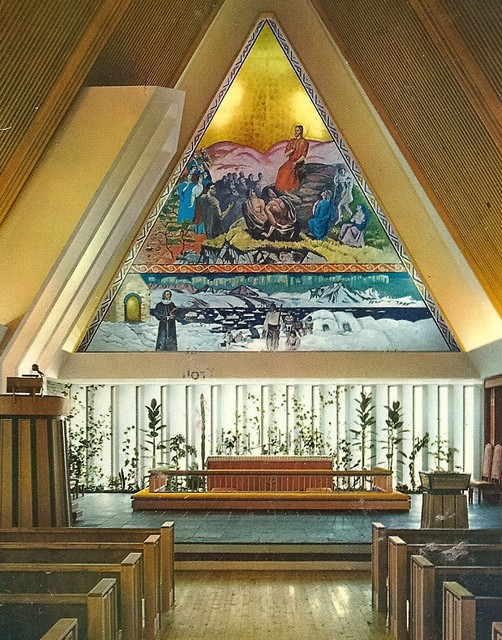

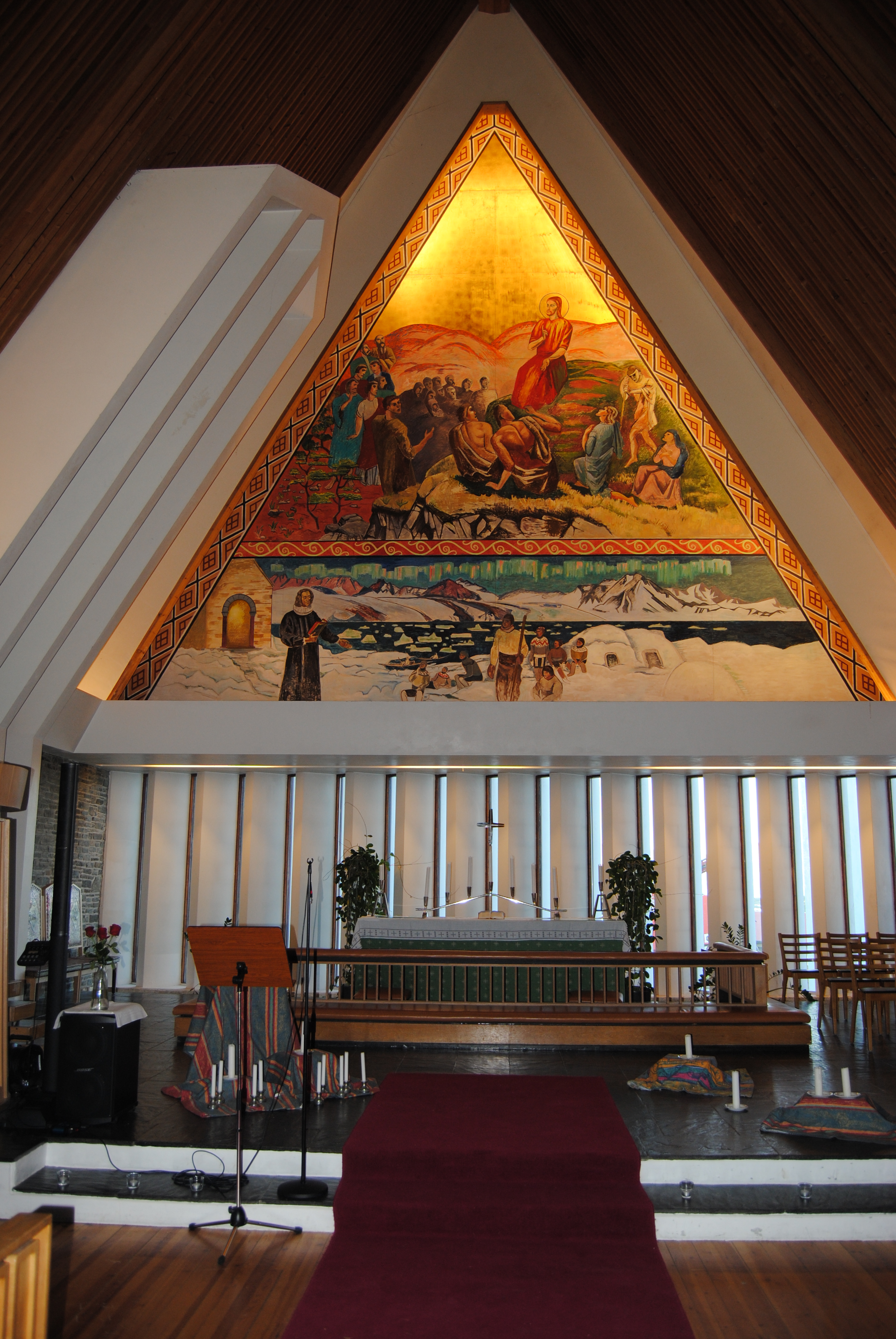

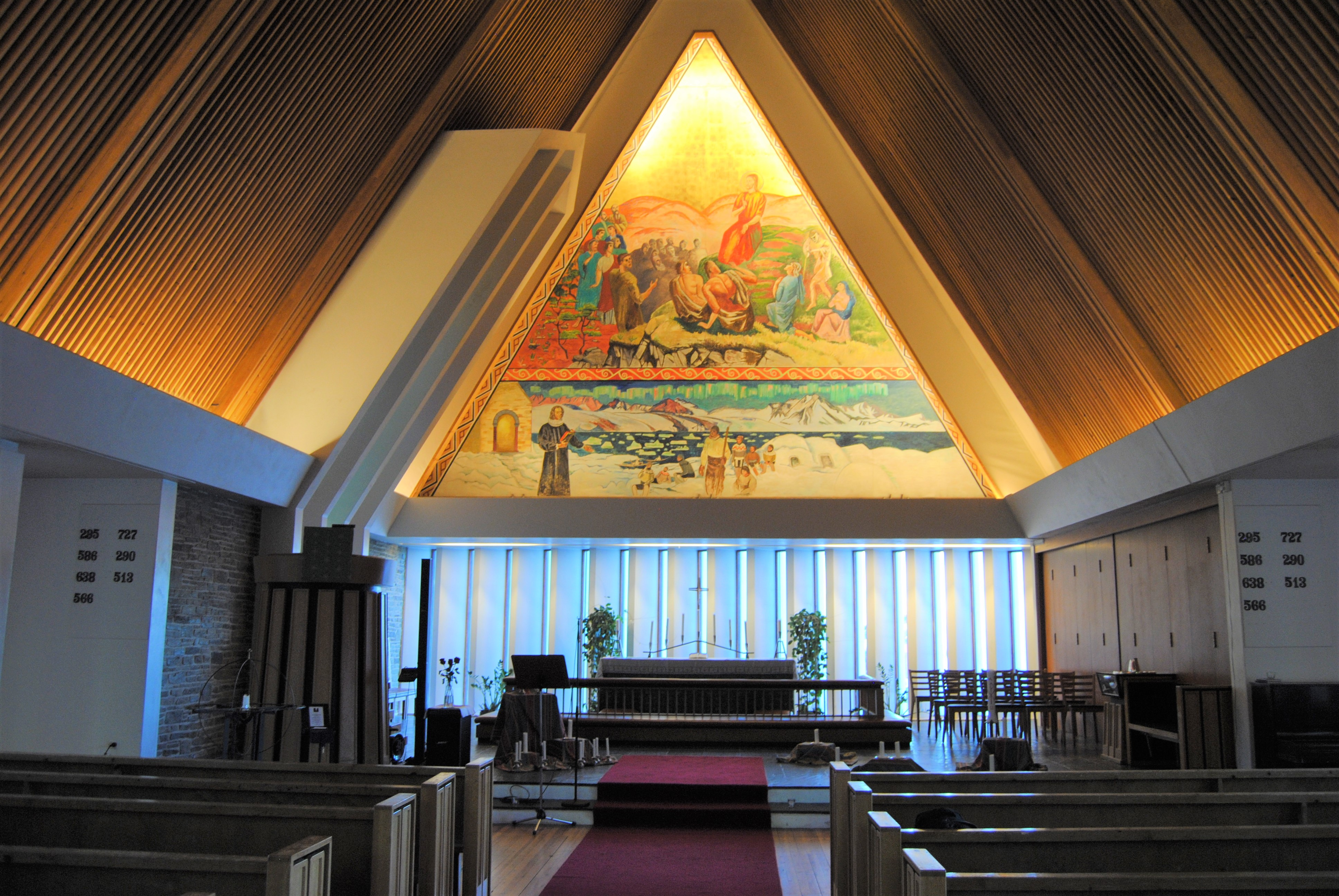

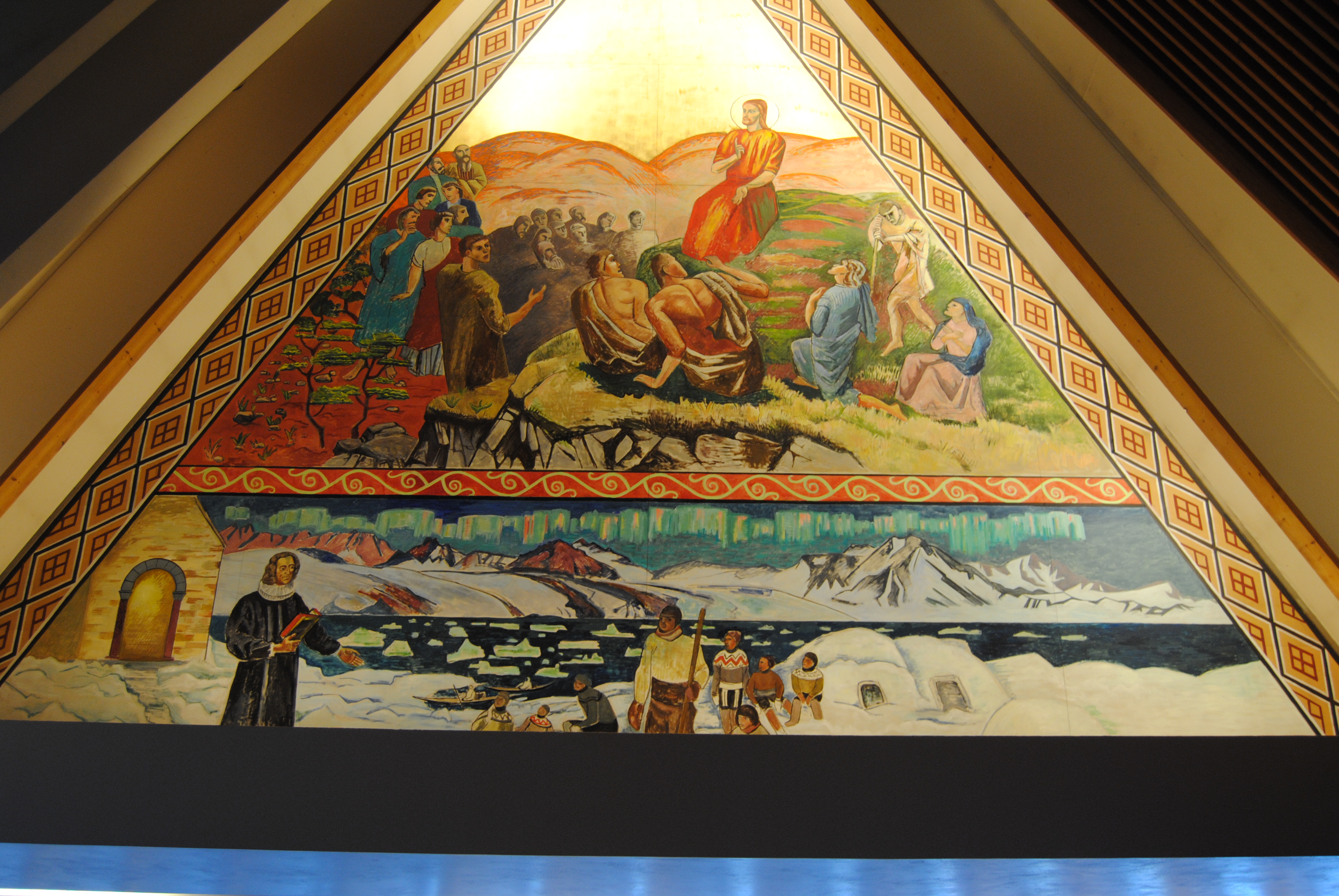

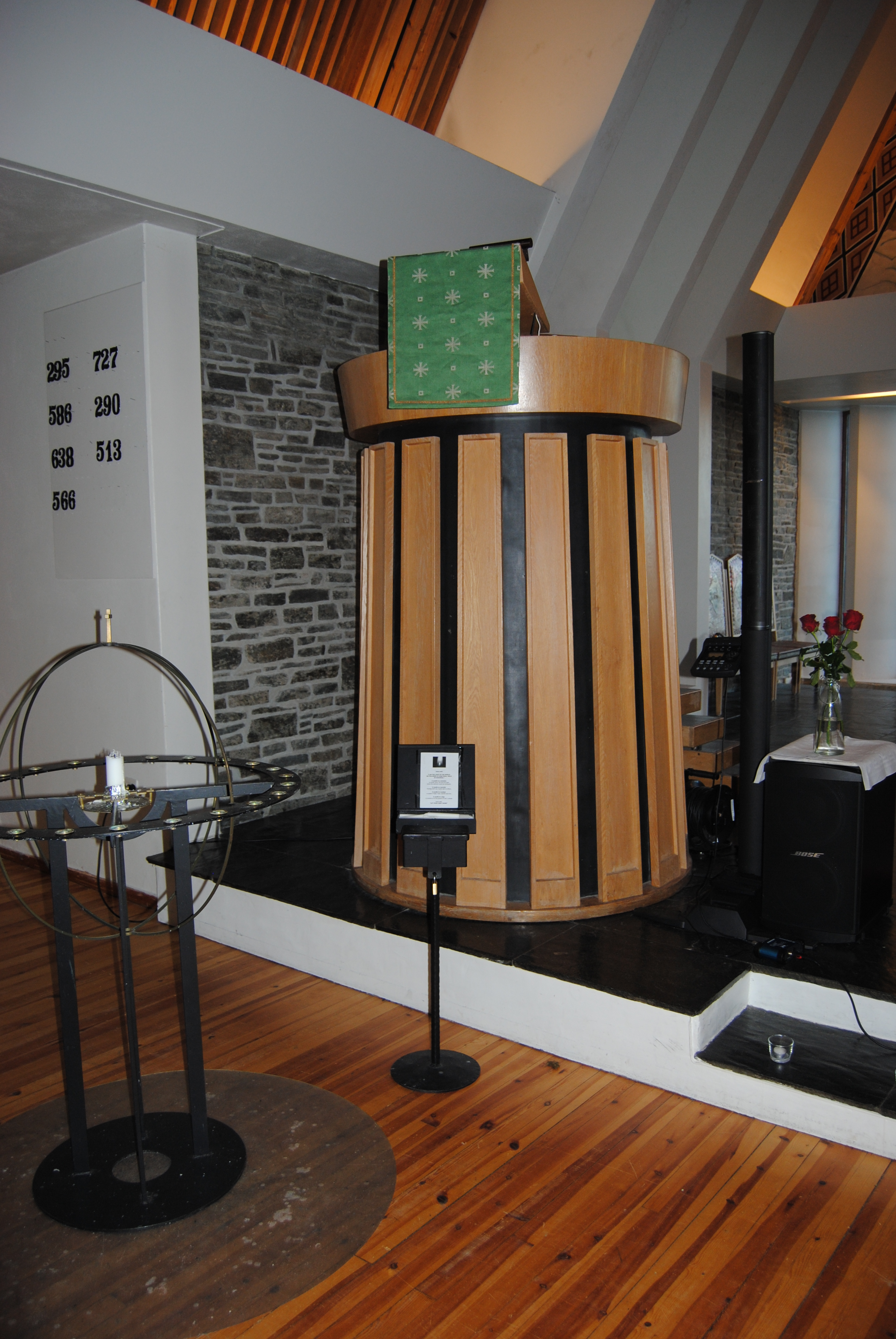

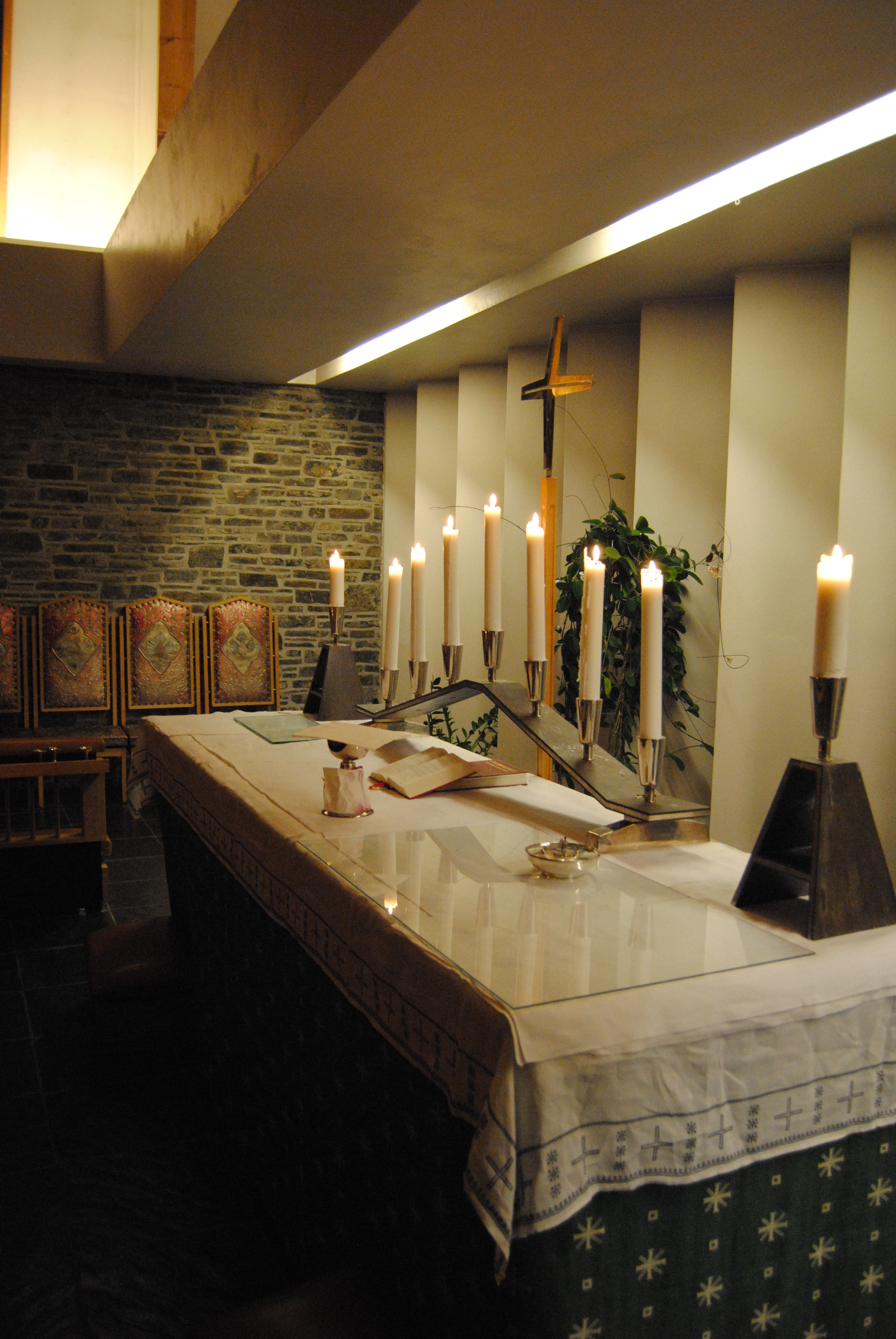

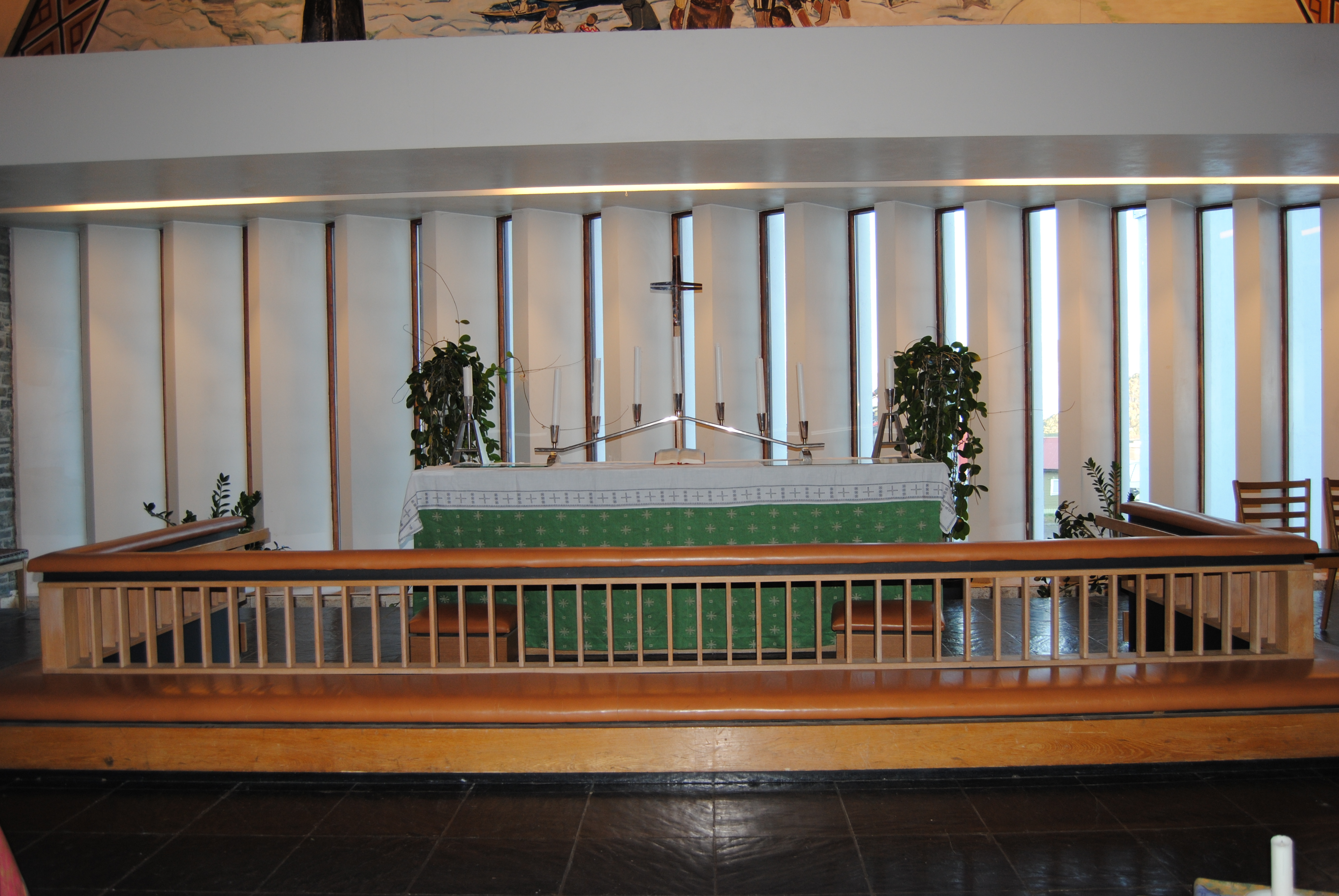

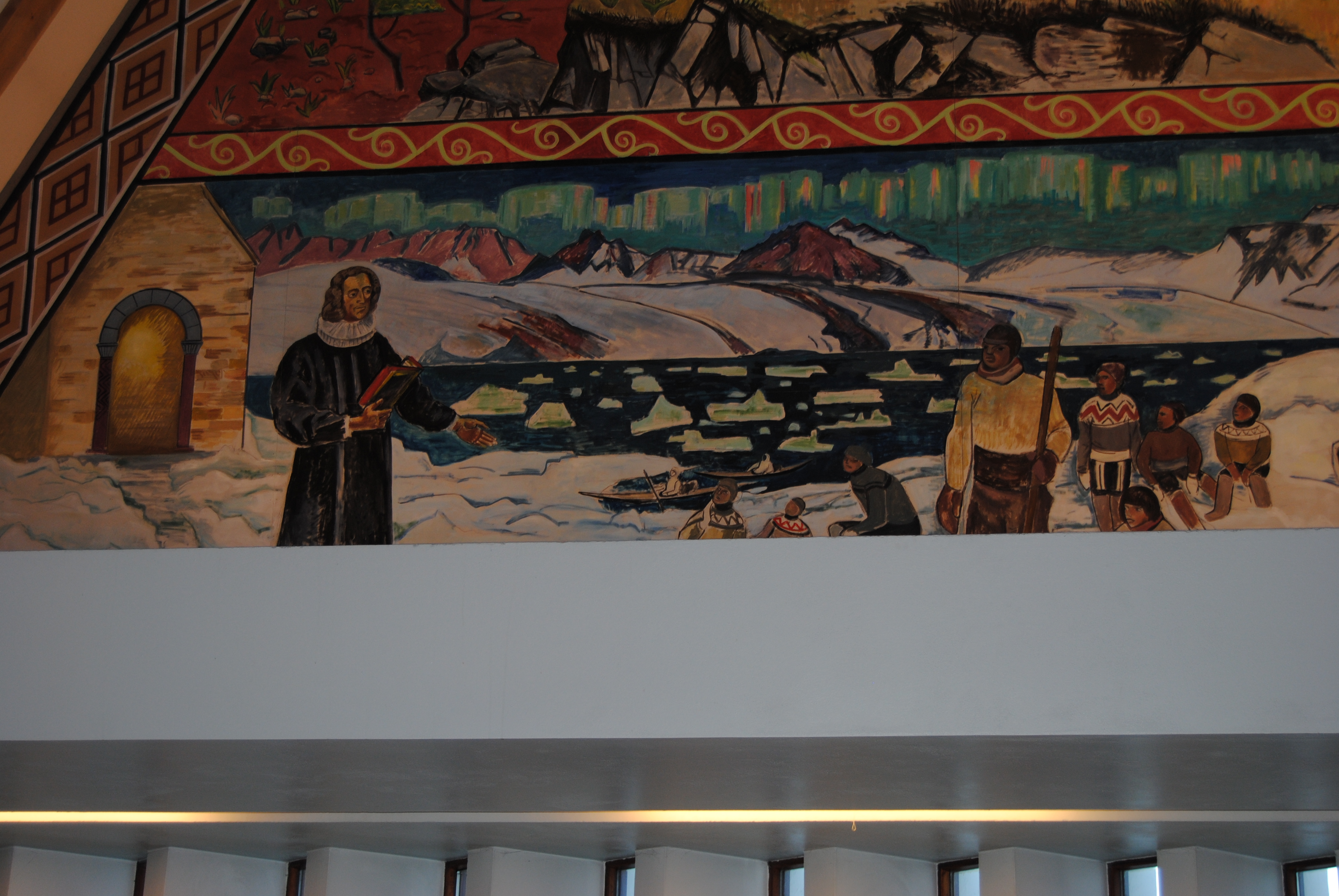

== See also ==
- List of churches in Nord-Hålogaland
