= Jan Inge Hovig =

Norwegian architect (1920–1977)

- Born: 11 May 1920; Verran, Norway
- Died: 4 June 1977 (aged 57); Oslo
- Education: Norwegian Institute of Technology
- Occupation: Architect
- Spouse: Ingrid Espelid Hovig
- Buildings: Arctic Cathedral

Jan Inge Hovig (11 May 1920 – 4 July 1977) was a Norwegian architect.

Hovig was born in Verran Municipality in Nord-Trøndelag county, Norway. He was the son of Johannes Sigurd Hovig (1895–1953) and Gudlaug Pauline Tangstad (1900–1969). Hovig finished his studies at the Norwegian Institute of Technology in 1946. He was a city architect during the reconstruction of Narvik 1947–1950. Narvik had been devastated in battle during 1940 as part of the Norwegian Campaign of the German invasion of Norway. In 1950, he moved to Oslo and founded his own office. In 1956, Hovig entered into a partnership with Christian Norberg-Schulz. From 1972, Hovig entered into a partnership with Helge B. Kvernes in Porsgrunn.

Hovig represented Norway at the Architecture Exhibition during the 1968 Summer Olympics in Mexico City. Hovig's most notable work is the Arctic Cathedral (Tromsdalen kirke), which was designed in 1960 and finished in 1965. The church is part of the Tromsøysund parish in the Diocese of Nord-Hålogaland. It is now probably the city's most famous building.

Jan Inge Hovig married Norwegian television chef and author Ingrid Espelid Hovig in June 1977. Just one week after the wedding ceremony, he died of myocardial infarction. He was buried at Vestre gravlund in Oslo.

== Notable works ==
- 1957: Fredskapellet (English: Peace Chapel) in Narvik
- 1958: Harstad Church (Norwegian: Harstad kirke)
- 1960: Villa Weidemann in Oslo
- 1961: Troms county administration building (Norwegian: Troms fylkeskommunalt administrasjonsbygg)
- 1962: The exhibition hall at Sjølyst (Norwegian: Messehallen på Sjølyst) in Oslo
- 1965: Arctic Cathedral (Norwegian: Tromsdalen kirke) in Tromsø
- 1965: Alfheim Swimming Pool (Norwegian: Alfheim svømmehall) in Tromsø
- 1965: Finnsnes Business Bank (Norwegian: Finnsnes Forretningsbank)
- 1968: Athletic Centre (Norwegian: Idrettens hus) in Narvik

== Gallery ==
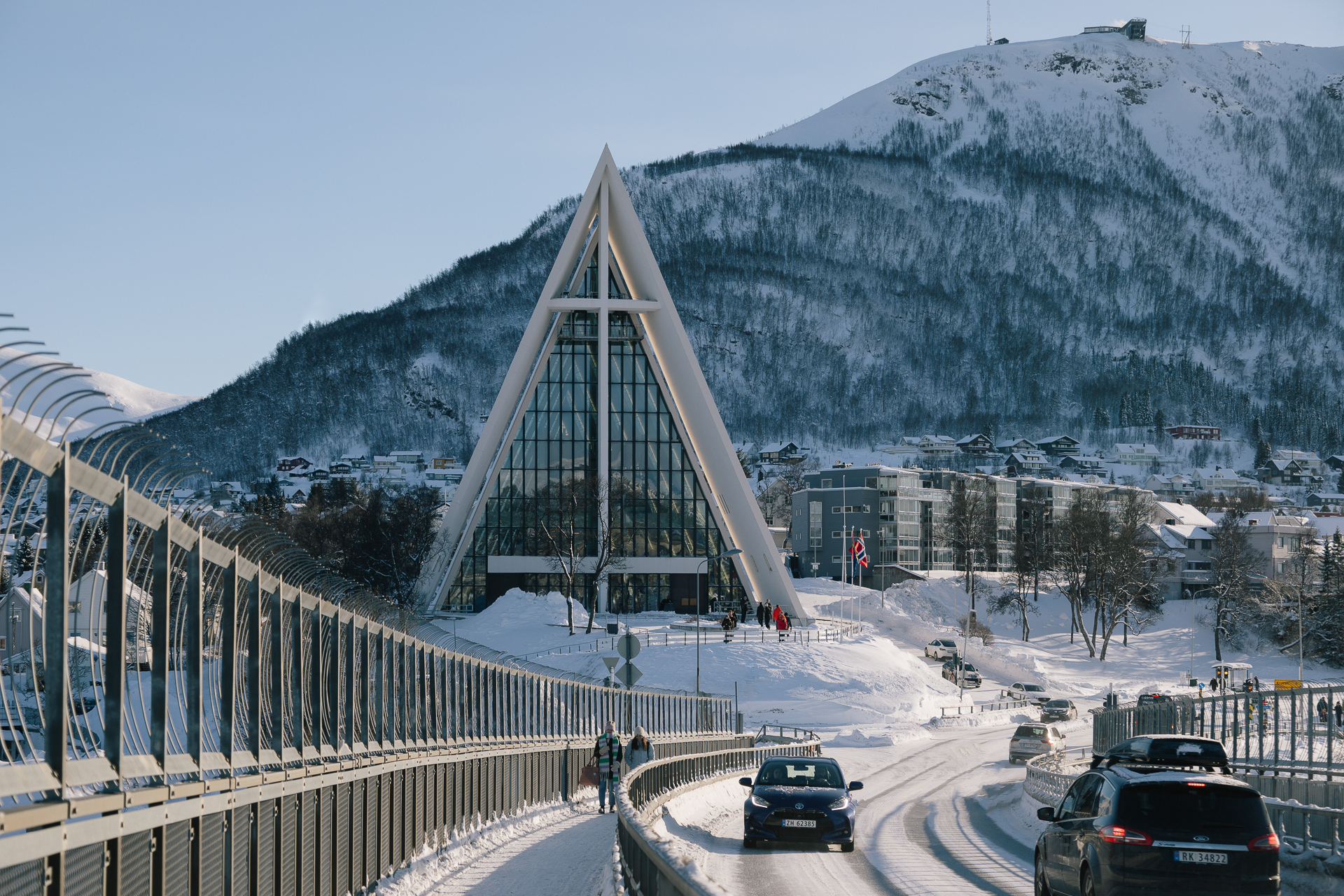
Arctic Cathedral, Tromsø

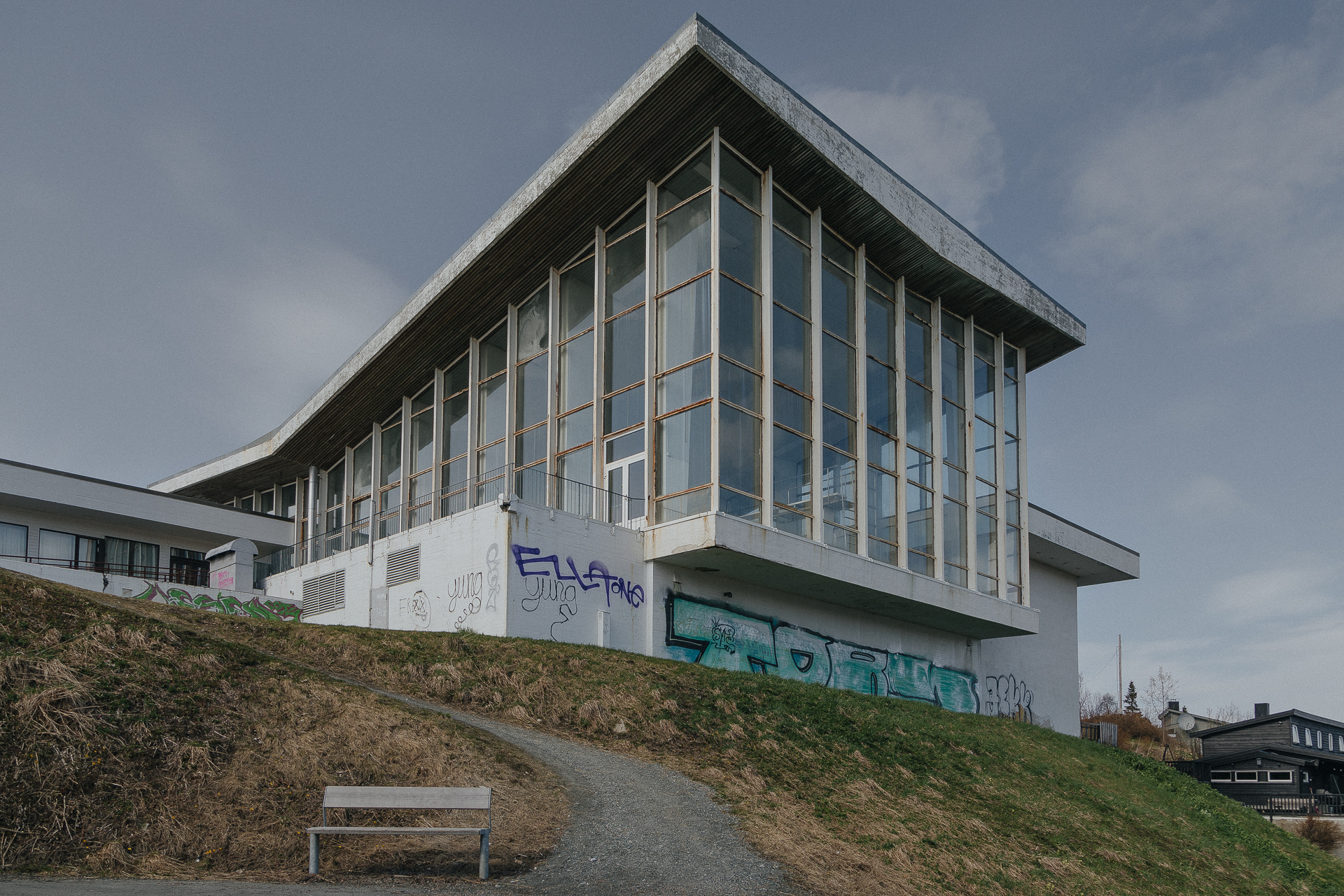
Alfheim Swimming Pool, Tromsø

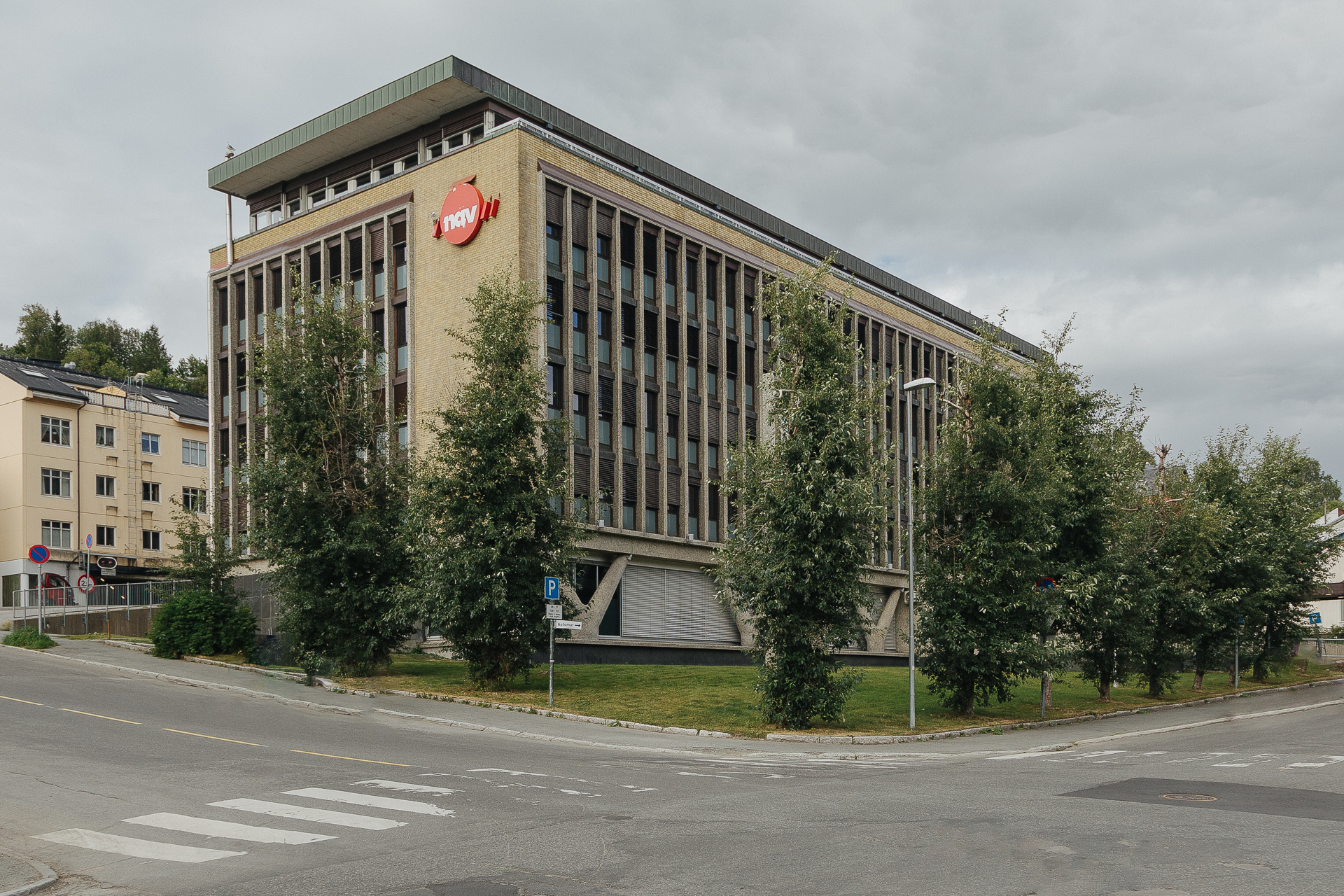
Grønnegata 122, Tromsø. Office of Norwegian Labour and Welfare Administration

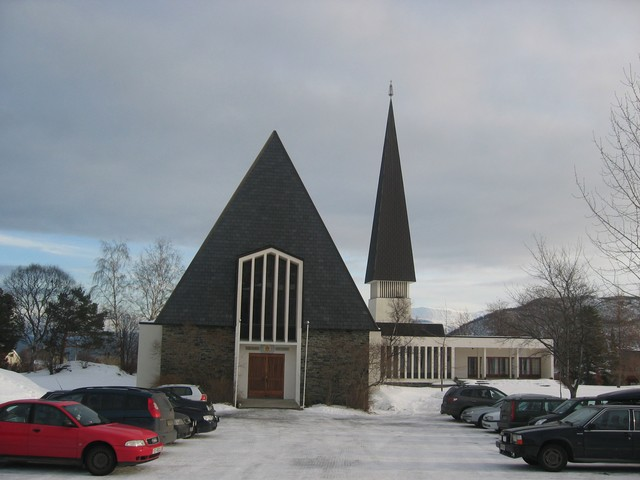
Harstad kirke
