= Boeckman Bridge =

- Formerly listed on the U.S. National Register of Historic Places
- Location within Missouri Location within the United States
- Location: Southeast of St. Elizabeth over Big Tavern Creek, near St. Elizabeth, Missouri
- Coordinates: 38°13′35″N 92°14′23″W
- Area: less than one acre
- Built: 1926
- Built by: Joseph A. Dice
- Demolished: 2002
- NRHP reference No.: 79001382

Significant dates
- Added to NRHP: March 19, 1979
- Removed from NRHP: by March 1993

Boeckman Bridge was a historic suspension bridge over Big Tavern Creek near St. Elizabeth, Miller County, Missouri, listed on the National Register of Historic Places. It was built in 1926, and was replaced by a concrete bridge in 2002.

== Bridge ==
Boeckman Bridge was a 240-foot, wire cable and timber suspension (swinging) bridge. The deck was 185 feet long and 12 feet wide and was suspended 29 feet above the creek; it consisted of flooring beams nailed to transverse stringer beams that rested on floor beams supported by the cables. All of these and the two portals were untreated locally milled oak. The main cables, anchored in concrete at each end, and the suspender cables were zinc-clad wire; for the main cables, 300 strands of wire were strung across the creek using a suspended bicycle wheel and then bound with an additional strand. A three-foot wire fence safeguarded pedestrians, and originally an additional wire was strung at each side of the floor beams and independently anchored at each end in order to steady the bridge in strong winds.

== History ==
Joseph A. Dice, a local engineer trained as a bridge-builder by physician and bridge designer Daniel Marion Eddy, supervised the construction of Boeckman Bridge and of five others in Miller County and several more elsewhere in the Osage River Valley. It was completed in March 1926 and named for Joseph Boeckman, who donated the necessary land; it was built by eight men, including Dice, Boeckman, and their sons. Originally designed to support vehicle traffic up to 4 tons, as of 1978 it was restricted to passage by single vehicles weighing under 2 tons.

It was added to the National Register of Historic Places on March 19, 1979, the only National Register property in the county. In 1988, the portals were replaced with steel; as of March 1993 the bridge was delisted by the National Register of Historic Places because of its poor state of preservation.

In 2002 the bridge was demolished and replaced with a concrete bridge.
