= Christine Böckmann =

German numerical analyst

- Born: Christine Hense; 1955 (age 69–70)
- Education: Diploma in 1980, dissertation in 1984 from Dresden University of Technology; habilitation from University of Potsdam
- Occupation: Applied mathematician

Christine Böckmann (née Hense, born 1955) is a German applied mathematician, numerical analyst, and expert on atmospheric lidar. She is an außerplanmäßiger Professor of mathematics at the University of Potsdam, and one of the Principal Investigators of EARLINET, the European Aerosol Research Lidar Network.

Böckmann studied mathematics at the Dresden University of Technology, earning a diploma in 1980 and completing her doctorate (Dr. rer. nat.) in 1984. Her dissertation, Ein ableitungsfreies Verfahren vom Gauß-Newton-Typ zur Lösung von nichtlinearen Quadratmittelproblemen mit separierten Variablen, was supervised by Hubert Schwetlick. She subsequently completed a habilitation at the University of Potsdam.
