= Diocese of Nidaros =

Lutheran diocese in Norway

Coordinates: 63.4269°N 10.3969°E

Diocese of Nidaros Nidaros bispedømme Nidarosen bæspatjïelte

Location
- Country: Norway
- Territory: Trøndelag county
- Deaneries: 9 prosti (2021)

Statistics
- Parishes: 121 (2021)
- Members: 357,914

Information
- Denomination: Church of Norway
- Established: 1068
- Cathedral: Nidaros Cathedral
- Language: Norwegian, Southern Sámi

Current leadership
- Bishop: Herborg Finnset, Bishop of Nidaros; Olav Fykse Tveit, Bishop Preses in Nidaros

Map
- Location of the Diocese of Nidaros

Website
- kirken.no/nidaros

Nidaros is a diocese in the Lutheran Church of Norway. It covers Trøndelag county in Central Norway and its cathedral city is Trondheim, which houses the well-known Nidaros Cathedral. Since 10 September 2017, the Bishop of Nidaros is Herborg Finnset. The bishop preses, currently Olav Fykse Tveit is also based at the Nidaros Cathedral. The diocese is divided into nine deaneries (prosti). While the bishop preses holds episcopal responsibility within the Nidaros domprosti (deanery) in Trondheim, the bishop of Nidaros holds episcopal authority of the other eight deaneries as well as the language based parish of the Southern Sámi.

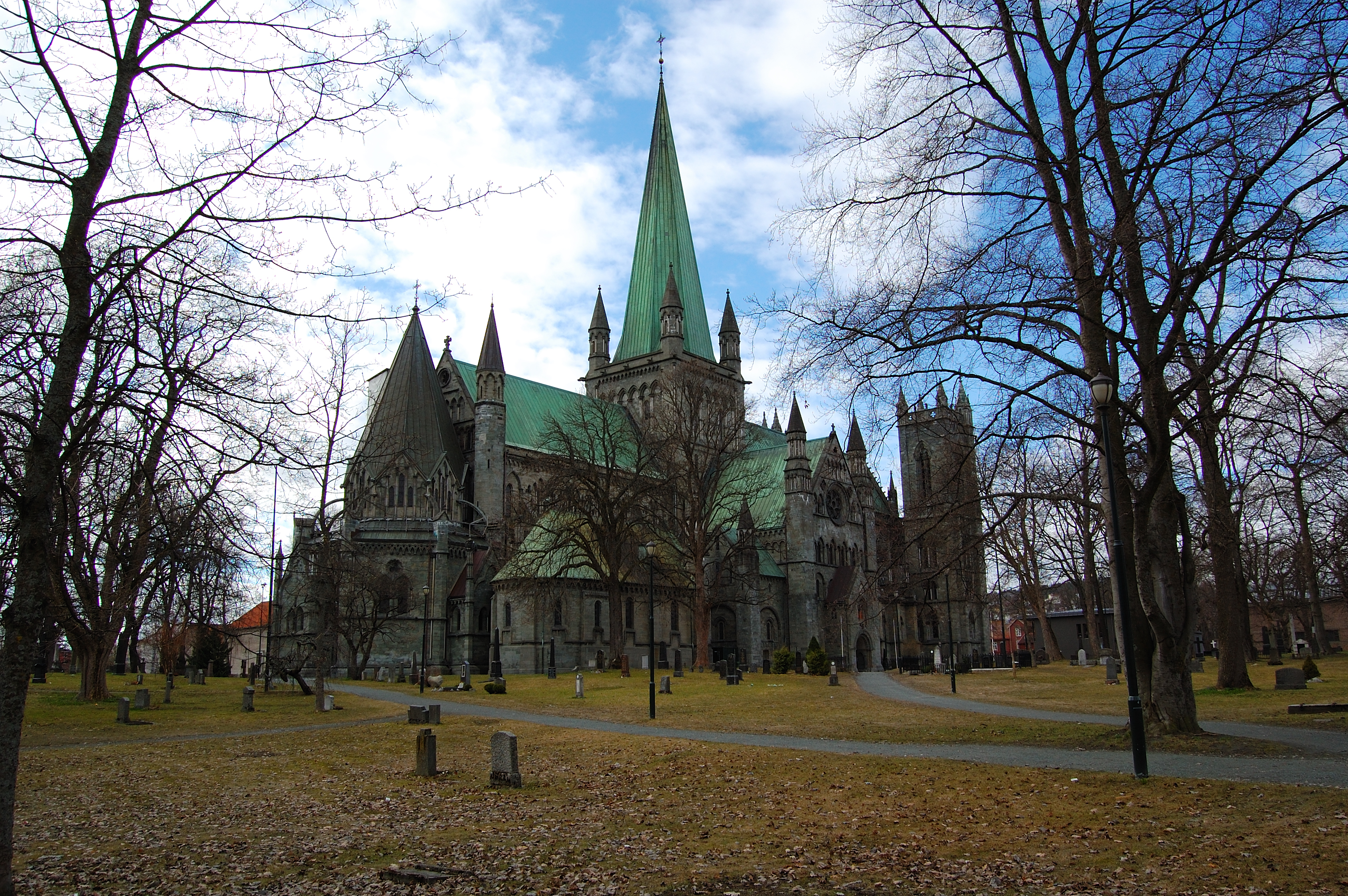
Nidaros Cathedral in Trondheim

== History ==
The diocese of Nidaros was established in 1068. It originally covered the (modern) counties of Trøndelag, Nordland, Troms, and Finnmark, along with the regions of Nordmøre and Romsdal (in Møre og Romsdal county) and Härjedalen (in Sweden), and also the northern part of Østerdalen (Tynset, Tolga, and Os). The region of Sunnmøre (in Møre og Romsdal) was transferred from Diocese of Bjørgvin to the new Archdiocese of Nidaros some time after 1152 – to secure it more income. Reformation took place in 1537; the Catholic archdiocese ceased, with the Lutheran diocese as its continuation.

The northern part of Østerdalen was transferred to the Diocese of Oslo some time after 1537. The province of Jämtland was transferred from Diocese of Uppsala to Nidaros in 1570. The region of Sunnmøre was transferred (back) from Nidaros to the Diocese of Bjørgvin in 1622. The provinces of Jämtland and Härjedalen were lost to Sweden in 1645. Northern Norway was established as a diocese of its own in 1804 (formally first in 1844). The parish of Innset was transferred from Diocese of Hamar to Nidaros in 1966. The regions of Nordmøre and Romsdal (together with Sunnmøre from Bjørgvin) were established as a diocese of its own (Diocese of Møre) in 1983.

== Structure ==
The Diocese of Nidaros is divided into nine deaneries (Norwegian: Prosti). Each one corresponds to several municipalities in the diocese. Each municipality is further divided into one or more parishes which each contain one or more congregations. In addition, the parish of the Southern Sámi language area fall under the bishop of Nidaros authority, while the Trondheim parish of the Deaf is pastored by the Deanery of Church of the Deaf and the bishop of Oslo.

Deanery (Prosti)	Municipalities
Nidaros domprosti	Trondheim
Heimdal og Byåsen prosti	Trondheim
Strinda prosti	Trondheim
Fosen prosti	Indre Fosen, Osen, Ørland, Åfjord
Orkdal prosti	Frøya, Heim, Hitra, Orkland, Rindal, Skaun
Gauldal prosti	Holtålen, Melhus, Midtre Gauldal, Oppdal, Rennebu, Røros
Stjørdal prosti	Malvik, Meråker, Selbu, Stjørdal, Tydal
Stiklestad prosti	Frosta, Inderøy, Levanger, Snåsa, Steinkjer, Verdal
Namdal prosti	Flatanger, Grong, Høylandet, Leka, Lierne, Namsos, Namsskogan, Nærøysund, Overhalla, Røyrvik

== Bishops ==
The bishops of Nidaros since the Protestant Reformation when Norway switched from Catholicism to Lutheranism:

- 1546–1548 Torbjørn Bratt
- 1549–1578 Hans Gaas
- 1578–1595 Hans Mogenssøn
- 1596–1617 Isak Grønbech
- 1618–1622 Anders Arrebo
- 1622–1642 Peder Skjelderup
- 1643–1672 Erik Bredal
- 1672–1672 Arnold de Fine
- 1673–1678 Erik Eriksen Pontoppidan d.e.
- 1678–1688 Christopher Hanssen Schletter
- 1689–1731 Peder Krog
- 1731–1743 Eiler Hansen Hagerup
- 1743–1748 Ludvig Harboe
- 1748–1758 Frederik Nannestad
- 1758–1773 Johan Ernst Gunnerus
- 1773–1789 Marcus Fredrik Bang
- 1788–1803 Johan Christian Schønheyder
- 1804–1842 Peder Olivarius Bugge
- 1843–1849 Hans Riddervold
- 1849–1860 Hans Jørgen Darre
- 1861–1883 Andreas Grimelund
- 1884–1892 Niels Laache
- 1892–1905 Johannes Nilssøn Skaar
- 1905–1909 Vilhelm Andreas Wexelsen
- 1909–1923 Peter W. K. Bøckman Sr.
- 1923–1928 Jens Gran Gleditsch
- 1928–1942 Johan Nicolai Støren
- 1945–1960 Arne Fjellbu
- 1960–1979 Tord Godal
- 1979–1991 Kristen Kyrre Bremer
- 1991–2008 Finn Wagle
- 2008–2017 Tor Singsaas
- 2017–present Herborg Finnset

== See also ==
- List of Lutheran dioceses and archdioceses
