= Hans Mogenssøn =

Danish priest (died 1595)

Hans Mogenssøn (also Mogensen, born about 1525 in Copenhagen, died 30 November 1595) was a Danish priest and the third Lutheran bishop in Trondheim.

== Life ==
Mogenssøn first studied at Copenhagen University, before continuing his studies at German universities and in Paris. In 1558 he received his master's degree and became a professor in Copenhagen the same year. Shortly afterwards he took over the teaching of Greek. In 1567 he became parish priest in Stege, and in 1574 in Lyngby in Skåne. In 1578 he was appointed assistant to bishop Hans Gaas in Trondheim, but Gaas died before Mogenssøn arrived. Mogenssøn had therefore to take over the office of bishop, and was ordained in 1579. A son of his, Mogens Hansen, was parish priest at Trondheim Cathedral. During his time as a priest, Mogenssøn translated several works into Danish. He is best known for his translation of Philippe de Commynes memoirs. The translation was republished by Poul Nørlund and Kristian Sandfeld 1913–1919.
