= Carl Fredrik Wisløff =

Norwegian theologian (1908–2004)

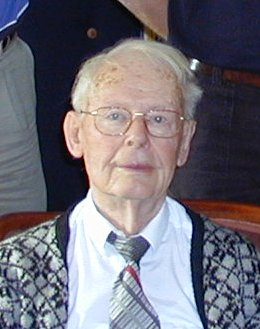
- Born: 31 December 1908; Drammen, Norway
- Died: 25 June 2004 (aged 95)
- Known for: President of the IFES (1967–1979)

Academic work
- Discipline: Church history
- Institutions: MF Norwegian School of Theology professor 1961–1975
- Occupation: Lay preacher

Ecclesiastical career
- Religion: Lutheran

Carl Fredrik Wisløff (31 December 1908 – 25 June 2004) was a Norwegian Lutheran theologian and preacher, who spent much of his professional career at the MF Norwegian School of Theology. He is considered among the most important lay preachers in 20th-century Norway.

== Early life and career ==
He was born in Drammen, but grew up in Sarpsborg. He was the nephew of Johan Martin Wisløff and a first cousin of later bishop Hans Edvard Wisløff.

Carl Fredrik Wisløff graduated with the cand.theol. degree in 1931, and was hired as a priest at Vaterland the next year. He was also hired as the first secretary of the Norges kristelige student- og gymnasiastlag, and also founded the organization's magazine, Credo. In 1940, he was appointed as a vicar at Birkenes Church.

== Later life and career ==
=== Jeg vet på hvem jeg tror ===
In 1946, Wisløff published Jeg vet på hvem jeg tror ('I Know in Whom I Believe'). In 2008, the liberal newspaper Dagbladet recognized the book as among the twenty-five most influential prose books in post-1945 Norway.

=== Academic career ===
In 1947, Wisløff was hired to head the priest's seminary at the MF Norwegian School of Theology. He also chaired the Norges kristelige student- og gymnasiastlag, from 1948 to 1960. He took the doctorate in 1958 on the thesis Nattverd og messe ('Communion and Mass'), which was translated into English (as 'The Gift of Communion') in 1964 and German in 1969. He joined the executive committee of the International Fellowship of Evangelical Students in 1959, and was appointed as professor of church history at the MF School of Theology in 1961. In 1967, he took over the presidency of the International Fellowship of Evangelical Students, a post he held until 1979. He retired as a professor in 1975.

Wisløff was known as an opponent of the World Council of Churches and liberal theology, rather adhering to a literal interpretation of the Bible. Among his preaching books were Ordet fra Guds munn (1951), Ordet om korset (1973), Lyset skinner i mørket (1976) and Daglig brød (1983). Other books include Politikk og kristendom (1961), volume one and three of Norsk kirkehistorie (1966, 1971), Kristne kirkesamfunn (1974), Den lutherske bekjennelse og katolisismen (1980), 2000 år med Kristus (1981) and Martin Luthers teologi (1984).

Wisløff died in June 2004, following short-term illness. His 100th anniversary was commemorated by the Norwegian Lutheran Mission. He was also honoured with two Festschrifts, both on his seventieth birthday.
