= Hans Edvard Wisløff =

20th-century bishop of the Church of Norway

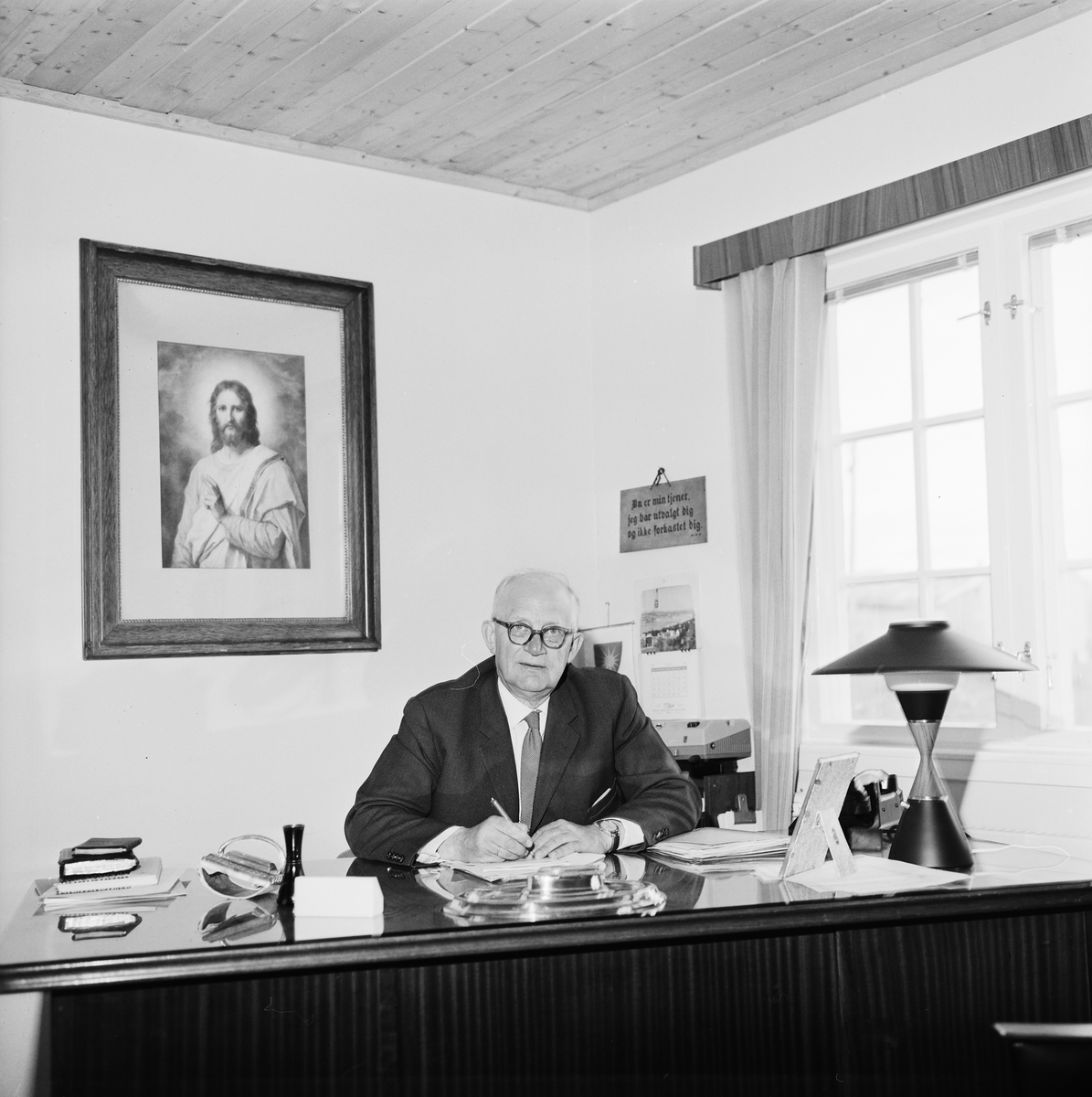
- Hans Edvard Wisløff in 1963
- Church: Church of Norway

Personal details
- Born: 10 May 1902 Moss, Norway
- Died: 14 September 1969 (aged 67) Bodø, Norway
- Denomination: Christian
- Parents: Johan Martin Wisløff and Tora Hansen
- Spouse: Astrid Elisabeth Wærum
- Occupation: Priest
- Education: Cand.theol.; MF Norwegian School of Theology

Hans Edvard Wisløff (1902–1969) was a Norwegian theologian and writer. He was also the Bishop of the Diocese of Sør-Hålogaland from 1959 until his death in 1969.

Wisløff received his Cand.theol. degree in 1926 from the MF Norwegian School of Theology in Oslo. He spent most of his career serving in several parishes in the Oslo area. He was the assistant pastor at Oppegård Church in Oppegård Municipality from 1926 until 1932. Then from 1932 until 1940 he served as the priest for the Tøyen Church. From 1940 until 1945 he worked as the resident chaplain at the Trefoldighet Church. From 1945 until 1954 he was the general secretary of the Indremisjonsselskapet mission society and the editor of the For fattig og rik newspaper. From 1954 until 1959, he worked as the parish priest of the Markus Church. In 1959, he was appointed the Bishop of the Diocese of Sør-Hålogaland, a post he held until his death in 1969.

Wisløff's parents were Johan Martin Wisløff and Tora Hansen and his cousin was Carl Fredrik Wisløff.

Church of Norway titles
Preceded by Wollert Krohn-Hansen	Bishop of Sør-Hålogaland; 1959–1969	Succeeded by Bjarne Odd Weider
