= Wollert Krohn-Hansen =

Wollert Krohn-Hansen Bishop

Personal details
- Born: 28 December 1889 Kristiansund, Norway
- Died: 3 April 1973 (aged 83) Kristiansund, Norway
- Denomination: Lutheran
- Occupation: Priest
- Education: Cand.theol.
- Alma mater: MF Norwegian School of Theology

Wollert Krohn-Hansen (28 December 1889—3 April 1973) was a Norwegian theologian and pastor. He was the Bishop of the Diocese of Hålogaland from 1940 until 1952, and was instrumental in dividing it into two smaller dioceses. After the division of the diocese, he was appointed as the first Bishop of the Diocese of Sør-Hålogaland from 1952 until his retirement in 1959.

== Biography ==
He was born at Kristiansund in Romsdalen county, Norway. In 1914, he received his Cand.theol. degree from the MF Norwegian School of Theology in Oslo. In 1915, he began his career as a parish priest for Værøy Municipality (which at that time also included the present-day Røst Municipality). He worked there until 1922 when he moved to Ofoten. From 1929 until 1936 he was the priest for Narvik. From 1936 until 1940 he was the priest of Tromsø Cathedral. In 1940, fourteen days before the German invasion of Norway, he was named the Bishop of the Diocese of Hålogaland. In 1952, his diocese was divided into two new dioceses: Diocese of Sør-Hålogaland and Diocese of Nord-Hålogaland. Krohn-Hansen then moved from Tromsø to Bodø to lead the new Diocese of Sør-Hålogaland. The northern diocese used the Tromsø Cathedral as its headquarters, but the new diocese in the south didn't have its own cathedral. The new Bodø Cathedral was built and it was consecrated in 1956 by Krohn-Hansen. He retired in 1959 and served in some interim pastoral work during his retirement. Krohn-Hansen died in 1973.

== Personal life ==
He was married during 1916 to Julie Konow (1893-1991). They were the parents of five children.

Church of Norway titles
Preceded by Sigurd Johan Normann	Bishop of Diocese of Hålogaland; 1940–1952	Diocese divided. See: Nord-Hålogaland and Sør-Hålogaland
New diocese	Bishop of Diocese of Sør-Hålogaland; 1952–1959	Succeeded by Hans Edvard Wisløff
