= Peter W. K. Bøckman Sr. =

Norwegian bishop and theologian (1851–1926)

Right Reverend Peter Wilhelm Kreydahl Bøckman Sr.
- Bishop
- Church: Church of Norway
- Diocese: Nidaros

Personal details
- Born: 6 August 1851 Håland Municipality, Norway
- Died: 23 May 1926 (aged 74) Oslo, Norway
- Denomination: Christian
- Parents: Nils Christopher Bøckman; Wencke Elisabeth Dietrichson
- Spouse: Beata Jervell (1878–1926)
- Occupation: Priest
- Education: University of Oslo, cand.theol. (1873)

Peter Wilhelm Kreydahl Bøckman Sr. (6 August 1851 – 23 May 1926) was a Norwegian bishop and theologian.

== Education and career ==
He was born in Håland Municipality in Stavanger county, Norway. He was the youngest of six children born to parish priest Nils Christopher Bøckman (1807–1873) and Wencke Elisabeth Dietrichson (1808–1880). He graduated with a cand.theol. degree from the University of Oslo in 1873. From 1873 to 1876 he was a teacher at Volda Teacher's College. From 1876 to 1877, he devoted his time to theological studies in Erlangen and Leipzig. He was then a chaplain in Bergen from 1877 until 1879, vicar in Skånevik from 1879 until 1890, and dean in Tromsø from 1890 until 1893. He was the bishop of the Diocese of Tromsø from 1893 until 1909, and then bishop of the Diocese of Nidaros from 1909 until 1923.

He was appointed a Knight of the Order of St. Olav in 1894 and got Commander Cross in 1904. He died in Oslo on 23 May 1926. He was married to Beata Jervell (1878–1926) and was a grandfather of scholar Peter W. K. Bøckman Jr. and journalist Knut Bøckman.

Church of Norway titles
Preceded by Johannes Nilssøn Skaar	Bishop of Tromsø; 1893–1909	Succeeded by Gustav Dietrichson
Preceded by Vilhelm Andreas Wexelsen	Bishop of Trondhjem; 1909–1923 (Diocese name changed to Nidaros in 1919)	Succeeded by Jens Gran Gleditsch
