= Peter W. K. Bøckman Jr. =

Peter Wilhelm Kreydahl Bøckman Jr. (14 May 1927 – 17 December 2006) was a Norwegian religious studies scholar.

He was born in Skjervøy Municipality in Troms county, Norway. He was a grandson of bishop Peter W. K. Bøckman, Sr. and brother of journalist Knut Bøckman. He graduated with a cand.theol. degree in 1953, and following studied in the United States and Sweden. He was hired as a lecturer at the University of Oslo in 1967. From 1975 to 1997 he was a professor of religious studies at the University of Trondheim. He published several books on theological topics.

== Selected works ==
- Gud og menneske : en kristen troslære (2004) ISBN 82-91925-10-0
- Den norske kirke : historisk og aktuelt (1989) ISBN 82-519-0984-8
- Liv, fellesskap, tjeneste. En kristen etikk (1970) ISBN 82-00-01159-3
