= Alan L. Boeckmann =

American chief executive

Alan L. Boeckmann served as the chief executive officer and chairman of Fluor Corporation between 2002 and 2011. He retired from Fluor in 2012.

Boeckmann became employed by the company in 1979 and served in various positions before his appointment as the chief executive officer. These positions included president, chief operating officer, chief executive officer of Fluor Daniel, and group president, Energy & Chemicals. In addition to his service with Fluor, he also serves as a director of BNSF and BHP.

Immediately upon his employment at Fluor, he began working on an Exxon fuels expansion project. Because he began the project at the office and then relocated to the worksite in Baytown, Texas, he was able to oversee the project from beginning to end. Within a few years of employment, he gained experience from travelling around the world to locations such as South Africa and Venezuela to work on various projects. One of his accomplishments involves the initiation of the company's use of a three-dimensional plant design that increased the company's global effectiveness.

In March 2019, he was elected to Fluor’s board of directors.

Boeckmann joined the board of BP in 2014.

== Education ==
Boeckmann attended the University of Arizona and received his undergraduate degree in electrical engineering.

== Compensation ==
While CEO of Fluor in 2009, Boeckmann earned a total compensation of $9,443,358, which included a base salary of $1,248,042, a cash bonus of $6,873,200, stocks granted of $2,133,083, options granted of $2,133,020, and other compensation of $265,933.
