= Vega Church =

Church in Nordland, Norway

- Vega kirke
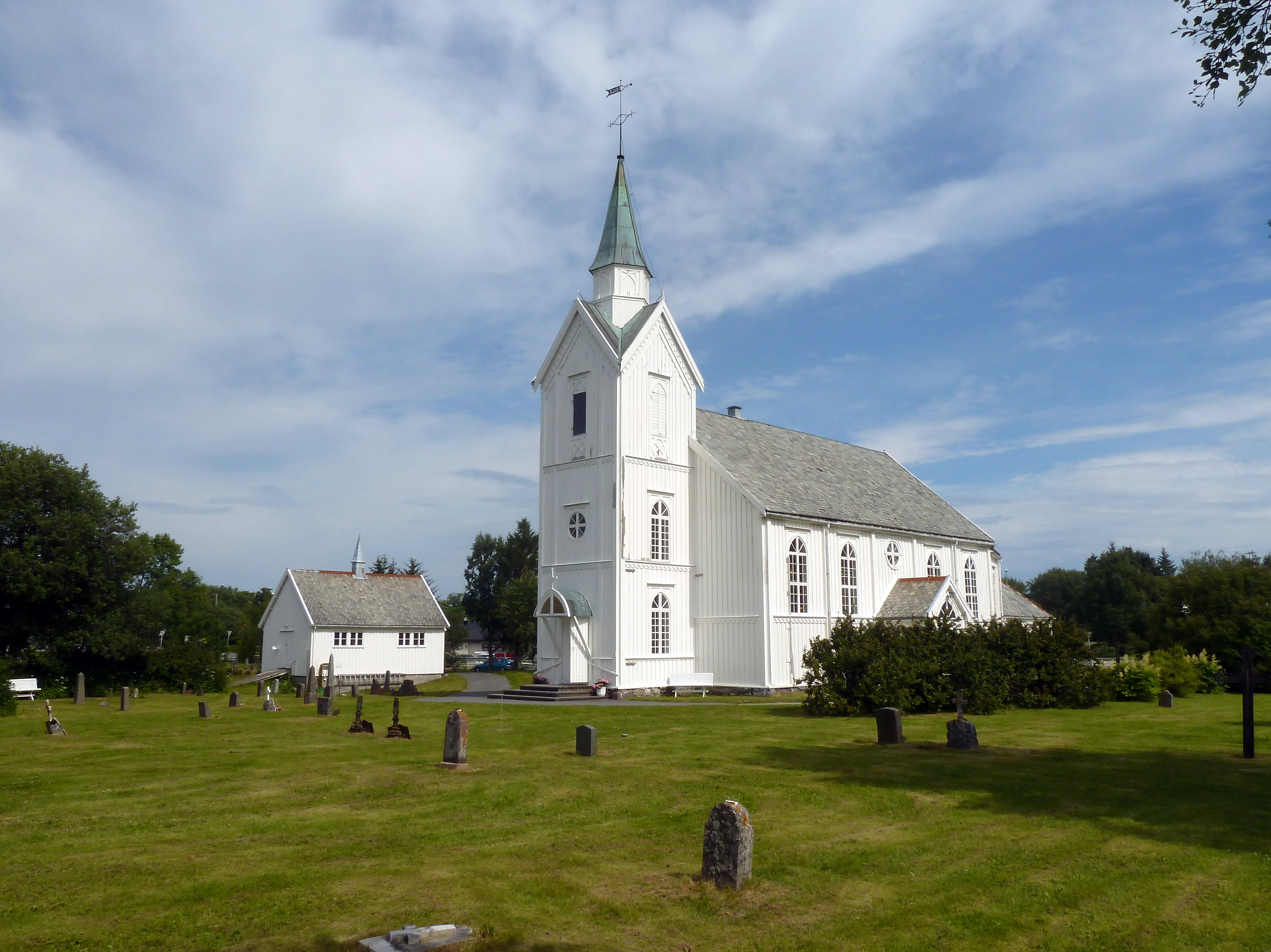
- View of the church
- Vega Church
- 65.6755214°N 11.9623156°E
- Location: Vega Municipality, Nordland
- Country: Norway
- Denomination: Church of Norway
- Churchmanship: Evangelical Lutheran

History
- Status: Parish church
- Founded: 15th century
- Consecrated: 14 July 1864

Architecture
- Functional status: Active
- Architectural type: Long church
- Completed: 1863 (163 years ago)

Specifications
- Capacity: 430
- Materials: Wood

Administration
- Diocese: Sør-Hålogaland
- Deanery: Sør-Helgeland prosti
- Parish: Vega
- Norwegian Cultural Heritage Site
- Type: Church
- Status: Listed
- ID: 85788

Vega Church (Norwegian: Vega kirke) is a parish church of the Church of Norway in Vega Municipality in Nordland county, Norway. It is located in the village of Gladstad on the island of Vega in the Vegaøyan archipelago. It is the main church for the Vega parish which is part of the Sør-Helgeland prosti (deanery) in the Diocese of Sør-Hålogaland. The white, wooden church was built in a long church style in 1863 to replace an older church. The building was consecrated on 14 July 1864 by the Bishop Carl Peter Parelius Essendrop. The church seats about 430 people.

== History ==
The earliest existing historical records of the church date back to the year 1589, but the church was not new that year. The first church was a log building that was located about 100 metres (330 ft) west of the present site of the church. In an inspection of the church in 1666, it was described as having a nave, choir, and entry porch. At some point, there had been an addition built on the west side of the nave that was in pretty good condition, but the rest of the church building was in poor condition. It wasn't until 1734, however, that the old church was torn down. A new timber-framed church was built on the same site as the previous building.

In 1814, this church served as an election church (Norwegian: valgkirke). Together with more than 300 other parish churches across Norway, it was a polling station for elections to the 1814 Norwegian Constituent Assembly which wrote the Constitution of Norway. This was Norway's first national elections. Each church parish was a constituency that elected people called "electors" who later met together in each county to elect the representatives for the assembly that was to meet at Eidsvoll Manor later that year.

In 1856–1857, the old church was torn down and a new church building was constructed on the same site. Unfortunately, in January 1858, a huge storm blew through and destroyed the newly built church. The following spring, planning for a new church was begun. This time, however, it was decided to build the new church on a site about 100 metres (330 ft) to the east of the site where all the previous church buildings had stood. The present church building was completed in late 1863 and it was consecrated the following summer on 14 July 1864.

== See also ==
- List of churches in Sør-Hålogaland
