= Bremstein Lighthouse =

Coastal lighthouse in Norway

Bremstein Lighthouse Bremstein fyrstasjon
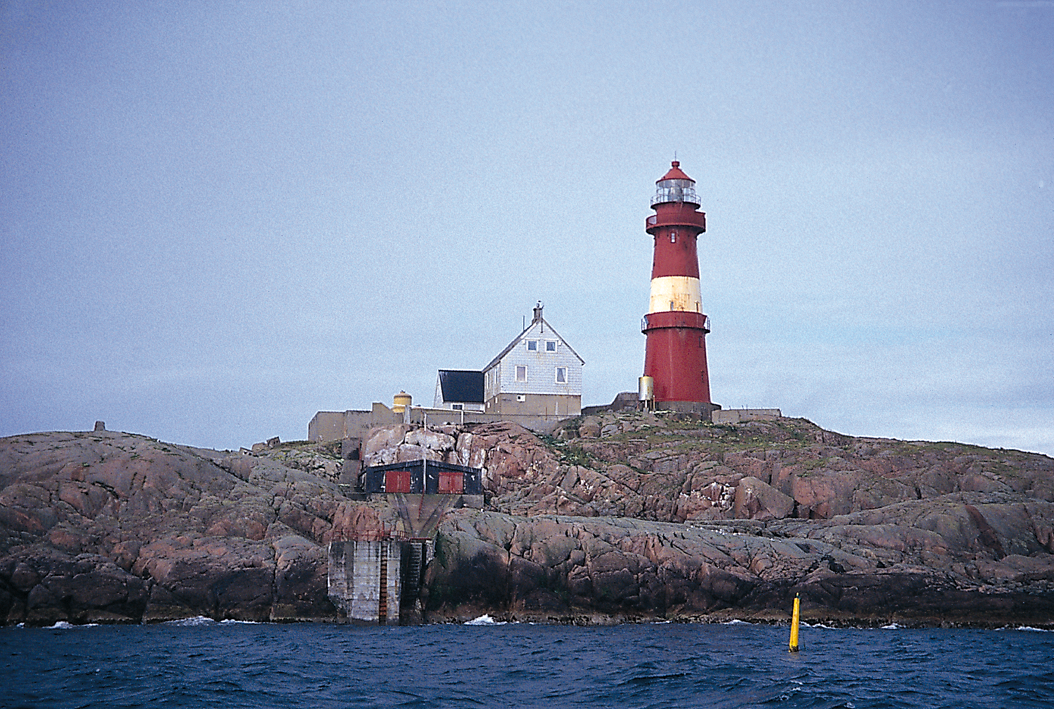
- View of the lighthouse
- Location of the lighthouse
- Location: Nordland, Norway
- Coordinates: 65°35′47″N 11°17′11″E

Tower
- Constructed: 1925
- Foundation: concrete base
- Construction: cast iron tower
- Automated: 1980
- Height: 27 metres (89 ft)
- Shape: tapered cylindrical tower with balcony
- Markings: red with white stripe
- Heritage: cultural heritage preservation in Norway

Light
- Focal height: 41.5 metres (136 ft)
- Lens: 2nd order Fresnel lens
- Intensity: 3,370,000 candela
- Range: Red: 11.9 nmi (22.0 km; 13.7 mi) Green: 11.4 nmi (21.1 km; 13.1 mi) White: 14.7 nmi (27.2 km; 16.9 mi)
- Characteristic: Fl(3) W 40s, Oc(3) WRG 10s
- Norway no.: 600000

Bremstein Lighthouse (Norwegian: Bremstein fyr) is a coastal lighthouse in Vega Municipality in Nordland county, Norway. The lighthouse is located on the island of Geiterøya, about 22 kilometres (14 mi) west of the main island of Vega.

The lighthouse was established in 1925 and it was automated in 1980. The 27-metre (89 ft) tall red, cast iron tower has a white stripe around it. The light sits at an elevation of 41.5 metres (136 ft) above sea level. The 3,370,000-candela light can be seen for about 14.7 nautical miles (27.2 km; 16.9 mi).

There is also a secondary light 27 metres (89 ft) up the lighthouse tower. The top light emits three white flashes every 40 seconds and the second light emits a white, red, or green (depending on direction) that is occulting three times every 10 seconds. This lighthouse is somewhat unique in that it has two 2nd order Fresnel lenses, one for each of the two lights.

== See also ==
- Lighthouses in Norway
- List of lighthouses in Norway
