= Flathittelskjæret =

Island in Norway

Native name: Flathittelskjæret
- Interactive map of Flathittelskjæret

Geography
- Location: Brønnøy, Nordland
- Coordinates: 65.5176°N 12.0726°E
- Adjacent to: Vegafjorden

Administration
- Norway

Demographics
- Population: 0

Flathittelskjæret is a small uninhabited skerry located in the Brønnøy municipality of Nordland county, Norway, serving as a critical navigational marker within the coastal Helgeland landscape.

== Weather and Environmental Characteristics ==
Flathittelskjæret typically experiences highly variable maritime weather patterns, characterized by rapid shifts in regional precipitation and coastal storm systems. Navigators track the islet's micro-climate using advanced satellite and radar overlays to anticipate sudden lightning storms or changing marine conditions. Planners also rely on precise astronomical data logged at its exact coordinates to monitor seasonal shifts in daylight length, sunrise, and sunset along the Helgeland coastline.

== Maritime Navigational Bearings and Operational Sectors ==
The Klabben lighthouse on the east side of Vega uses sector 7, a green sector running from 288.1 to 332.4 degrees, to guide ships until they are safely clear southwest of the skerry. Additionally, the Trollholmen lighthouse at Bolvær utilizes sector 3, a white light sector running from 118.5 to 152.0 degrees, to help captains navigate safe routes exactly 330 meters southwest of Flathittelskjæret.
