= Ylvingen Chapel =

Church in Nordland, Norway

- Ylvingen kapell
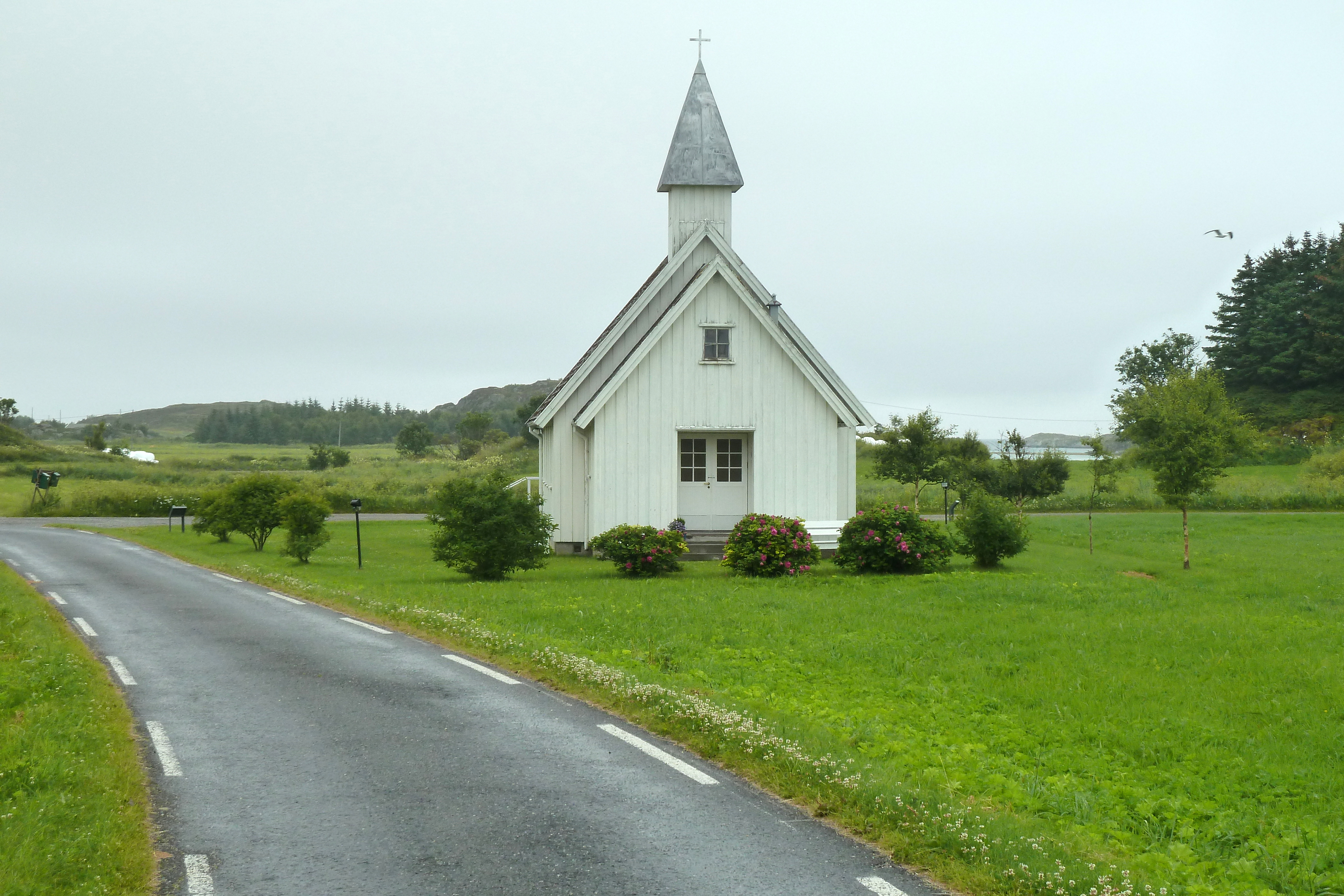
- View of the chapel
- Ylvingen Chapel
- 65.6357093°N 12.1713227°E
- Location: Vega Municipality, Nordland
- Country: Norway
- Denomination: Church of Norway
- Churchmanship: Evangelical Lutheran

History
- Status: Chapel
- Founded: 1967
- Consecrated: 15 June 1967

Architecture
- Functional status: Active
- Architect: Arne Reppen
- Architectural type: Long church
- Completed: 1967 (59 years ago)

Specifications
- Capacity: 80
- Materials: Wood

Administration
- Diocese: Sør-Hålogaland
- Deanery: Sør-Helgeland prosti
- Parish: Vega
- Norwegian Cultural Heritage Site
- Type: Church
- Status: Not protected
- ID: 85889

Ylvingen Chapel (Norwegian: Ylvingen kapell) is a chapel of the Church of Norway in Vega Municipality in Nordland county, Norway. It is located on the island of Ylvingen. It is an annex chapel in the Vega parish which is part of the Sør-Helgeland prosti (deanery) in the Diocese of Sør-Hålogaland. The white, wooden chapel was built in a long church style in 1967 using plans drawn up by the architect Arne Reppen. The chapel seats about 80 people. The chapel was consecrated on 15 June 1967 by the Bishop Hans Edvard Wisløff.

== See also ==
- List of churches in Sør-Hålogaland
