= Gladstad =

Village in Vega Municipality, Norway

- Village
- Interactive map of Gladstad
- Location within Nordland Location within Norway
- Coordinates: 65.6768°N 11.9622°E
- Country: Norway
- Region: Northern Norway
- County: Nordland
- District: Helgeland
- Municipality: Vega Municipality

Area
  - Total: 0.5 km^{2} (0.19 sq mi)
- Elevation: 11 m (36 ft)

Population (2024)
  - Total: 306
  - Density: 612/km^{2} (1,590/sq mi)
- Time zone: UTC+01:00 (CET)
  - Summer (DST): UTC+02:00 (CEST)
- Post Code: 8980 Vega

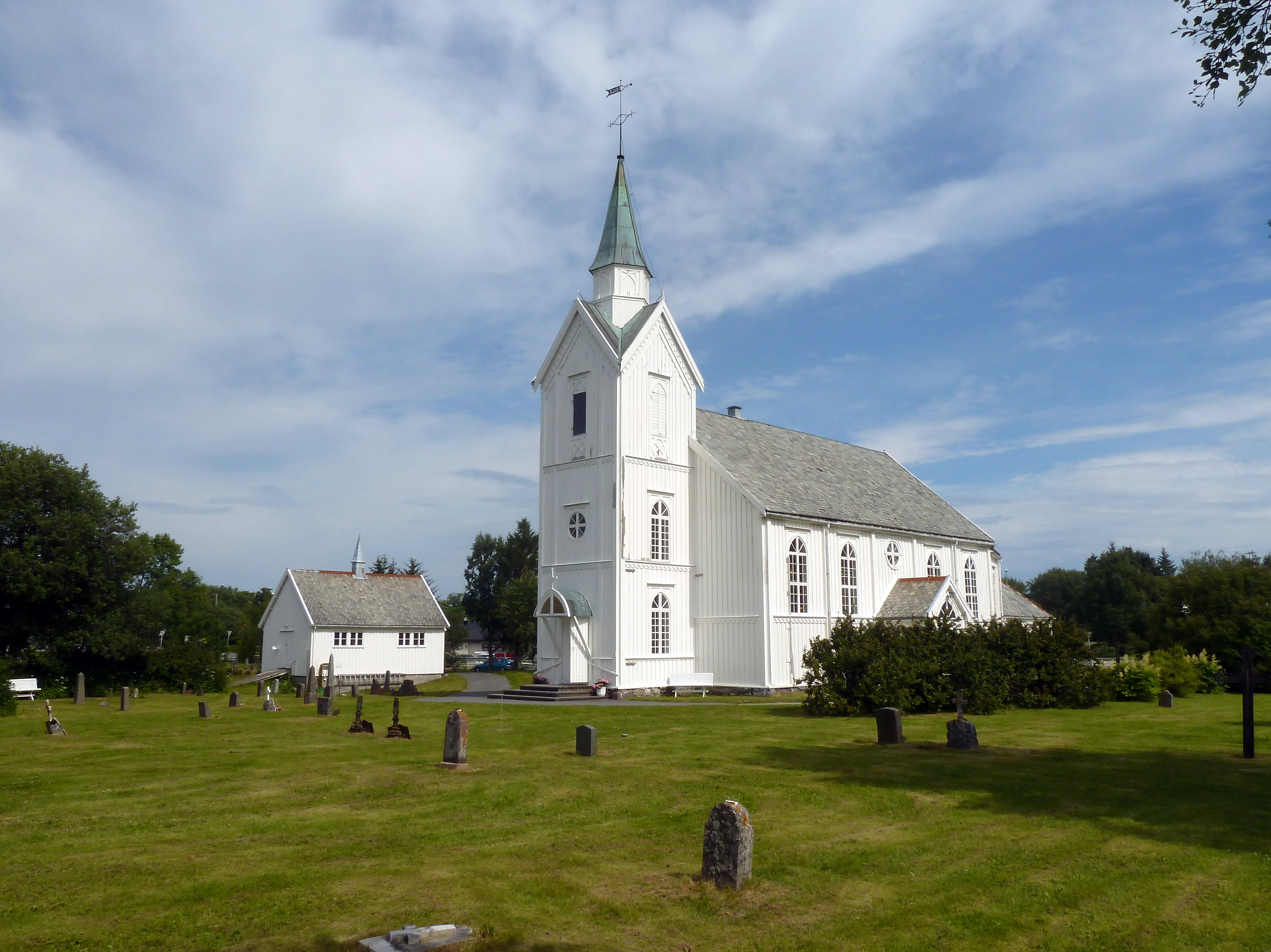
Vega church in Gladstad.

Gladstad is the administrative centre of Vega Municipality in Nordland county, Norway. It is located in the central part of the island of Vega, about 3.5 kilometres (2.2 mi) southeast of the village of Holand. Vega Church is located in Gladstad.

The 0.5-square-kilometre (120-acre) village has a population (2024) of 306 and a population density of 612 inhabitants per square kilometre (1,590/sq mi).
