= Ylvingen =

Island in Nordland, Norway

- Interactive map of Ylvingen

Geography
- Location: Nordland, Norway
- Coordinates: 65.6249°N 12.1596°E
- Archipelago: Vegaøyan
- Area: 7.6 km^{2} (2.9 sq mi)
- Length: 6 km (3.7 mi)
- Width: 1.5 km (0.93 mi)
- Highest elevation: 68 m (223 ft)
- Highest point: Stornonshaugen

Administration
- Norway
- County: Nordland
- Municipality: Vega Municipality

Demographics
- Population: 25 (2017)

Ylvingen is an island in Vega Municipality in Nordland county, Norway. The 7.6-square-kilometre (2.9 sq mi) island lies just off the west coast of Norway, between the island of Vega and the mainland. In 2017, there were 25 residents on the island.

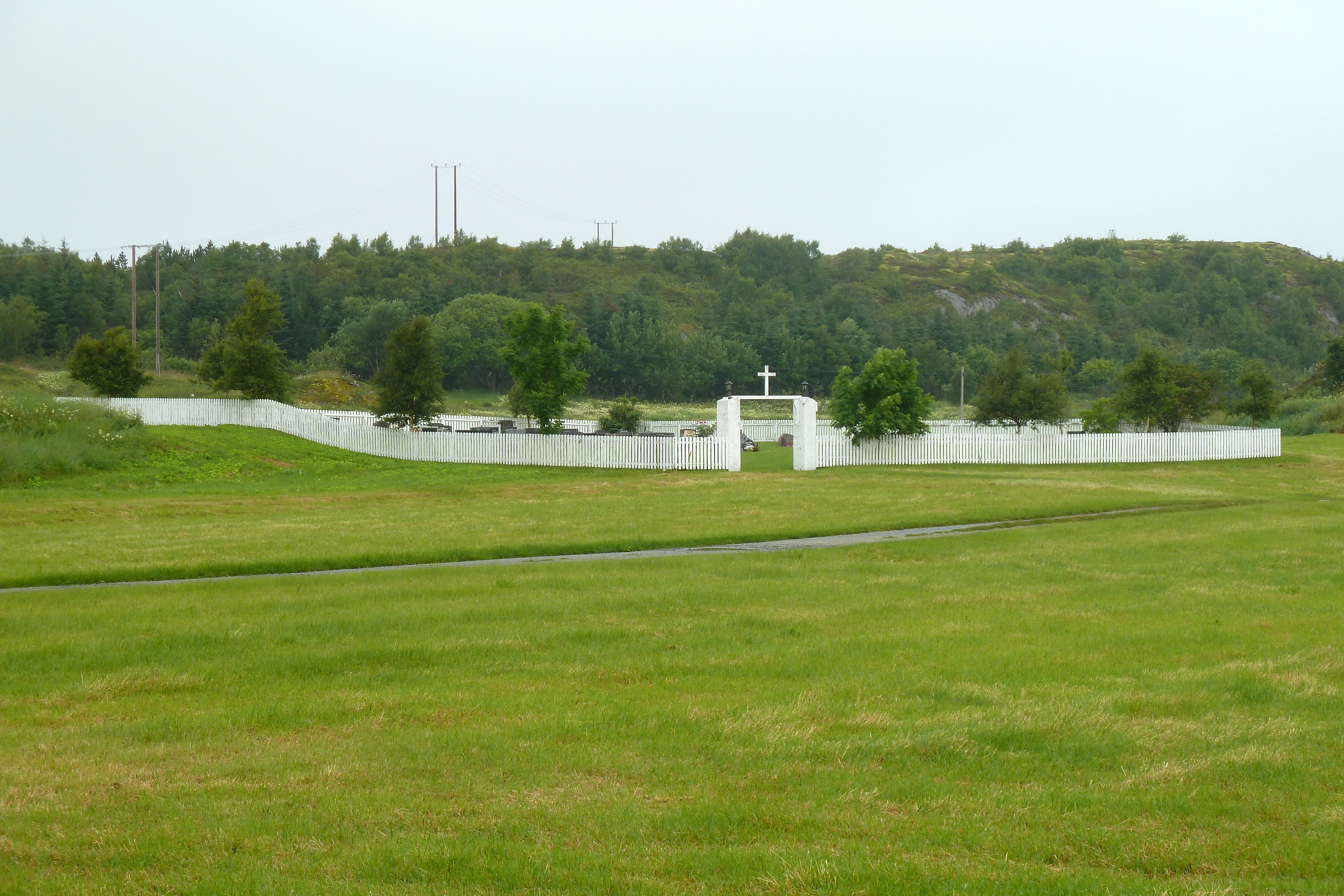
View of the churchyard of the Ylvingen Chapel

The island is connected by fast ferry to the mainland towns of Brønnøysund and Sandnessjøen, and to the island of Vega and the mainland by car ferry, all operated by Torghatten Trafikkselskap.

The landscape is relatively flat, yet rocky in many places. The highest point on the island is the 68-metre (223 ft) tall mountain Stornonshaugen in the middle of the island. The island has a relatively large moose population. The residents of the island earn a living by farming and fishing and the island has increasing tourist traffic.

== History ==
During the Second World War, the island was used by the German Armed Forces as an emplacement and had prisoners of war from Russia, Serbia, and Poland doing forced labor. The television series Himmelblå was filmed on the island.

== See also ==
- List of islands of Norway
