= Igerøya =

Island in Nordland, Norway

- Interactive map of Igerøya

Geography
- Location: Nordland, Norway
- Coordinates: 65.6789°N 12.0928°E
- Archipelago: Vegaøyan
- Area: 6.6 km^{2} (2.5 sq mi)
- Length: 4 km (2.5 mi)
- Width: 2.7 km (1.68 mi)

Administration
- Norway
- County: Nordland
- Municipality: Vega Municipality

Demographics
- Population: 91 (2015)

Igerøya is an island in Vega Municipality in Nordland county, Norway. The 6.6-square-kilometre (2.5 sq mi) island is located just northeast of the island of Vega. The two islands are connected by a series of bridges over small islands. Igerøya is connected to the island of Tjøtta by a regular ferry route. In 2015, the island had 91 residents. Most of the inhabitants of the island live along the eastern side of the island.

== See also ==
- List of islands of Norway
