= Haakon Olsen Wika =

Norwegian politician

Haakon Olsen Wika (1 July 1899 – 11 February 1981) was a Norwegian politician for the Labour Party.

He was born in Vega Municipality.

He was elected to the Norwegian Parliament from Nordland in 1937, and was re-elected on one occasion.

Wika was a member of the municipal council of Vega Municipality from 1928 to 1947, and then served as mayor there from 1947 to 1966. He was also a long-time member of Nordland county council.
