= Holand, Vega =

Village in Vega Municipality, Norway

Holand
- Village
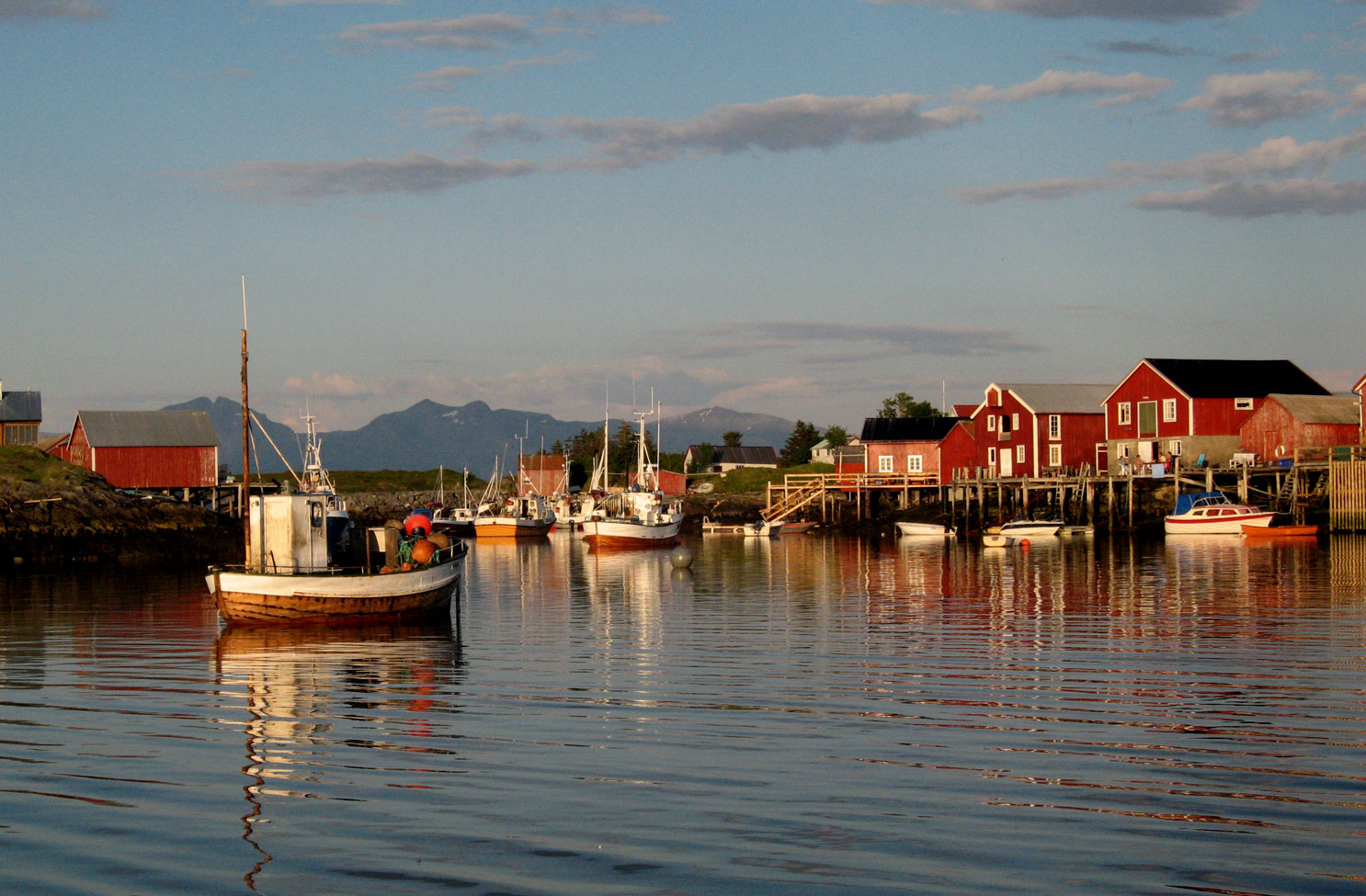
- View of the harbor
- Interactive map of Holand
- Location within Nordland Location within Norway
- Coordinates: 65.7052°N 11.9125°E
- Country: Norway
- Region: Northern Norway
- County: Nordland
- District: Helgeland
- Municipality: Vega Municipality
- Elevation: 4 m (13 ft)
- Time zone: UTC+01:00 (CET)
  - Summer (DST): UTC+02:00 (CEST)
- Post Code: 8980 Vega

Holand is a village in Vega Municipality in Nordland county, Norway. It is located on the north end of the island of Vega about 3.5 kilometres (2.2 mi) north of the village of Gladstad.

== Climate ==
Climate data for Vega - Vallsjø 1991-2020 (4 m)
Month	Jan	Feb	Mar	Apr	May	Jun	Jul	Aug	Sep	Oct	Nov	Dec	Year
Mean daily maximum °C (°F)	3 (37)	2.6 (36.7)	3.7 (38.7)	6.9 (44.4)	10.6 (51.1)	13.4 (56.1)	16.2 (61.2)	16.3 (61.3)	13.4 (56.1)	8.9 (48.0)	5.6 (42.1)	3.9 (39.0)	8.7 (47.6)
Daily mean °C (°F)	0.8 (33.4)	0.1 (32.2)	1 (34)	4 (39)	7.5 (45.5)	10.6 (51.1)	13.2 (55.8)	13.2 (55.8)	10.5 (50.9)	6.4 (43.5)	3.3 (37.9)	1.7 (35.1)	6.0 (42.8)
Mean daily minimum °C (°F)	−1.9 (28.6)	−2.4 (27.7)	−1.5 (29.3)	1.5 (34.7)	4.9 (40.8)	8.4 (47.1)	10.8 (51.4)	10.7 (51.3)	8.1 (46.6)	4 (39)	0.9 (33.6)	−0.9 (30.4)	3.6 (38.4)
Average precipitation mm (inches)	127 (5.0)	115 (4.5)	117 (4.6)	84 (3.3)	62 (2.4)	64 (2.5)	67 (2.6)	85 (3.3)	126 (5.0)	126 (5.0)	125 (4.9)	143 (5.6)	1,241 (48.7)
Source 1: Norwegian Meteorological Institute
Source 2: Noaa WMO averages 91-2020 Norway
