= Vega Municipality =

Municipality in Nordland, Norway

Vega Municipality Vega kommune
- Municipality
- Vegø herred (historic name)
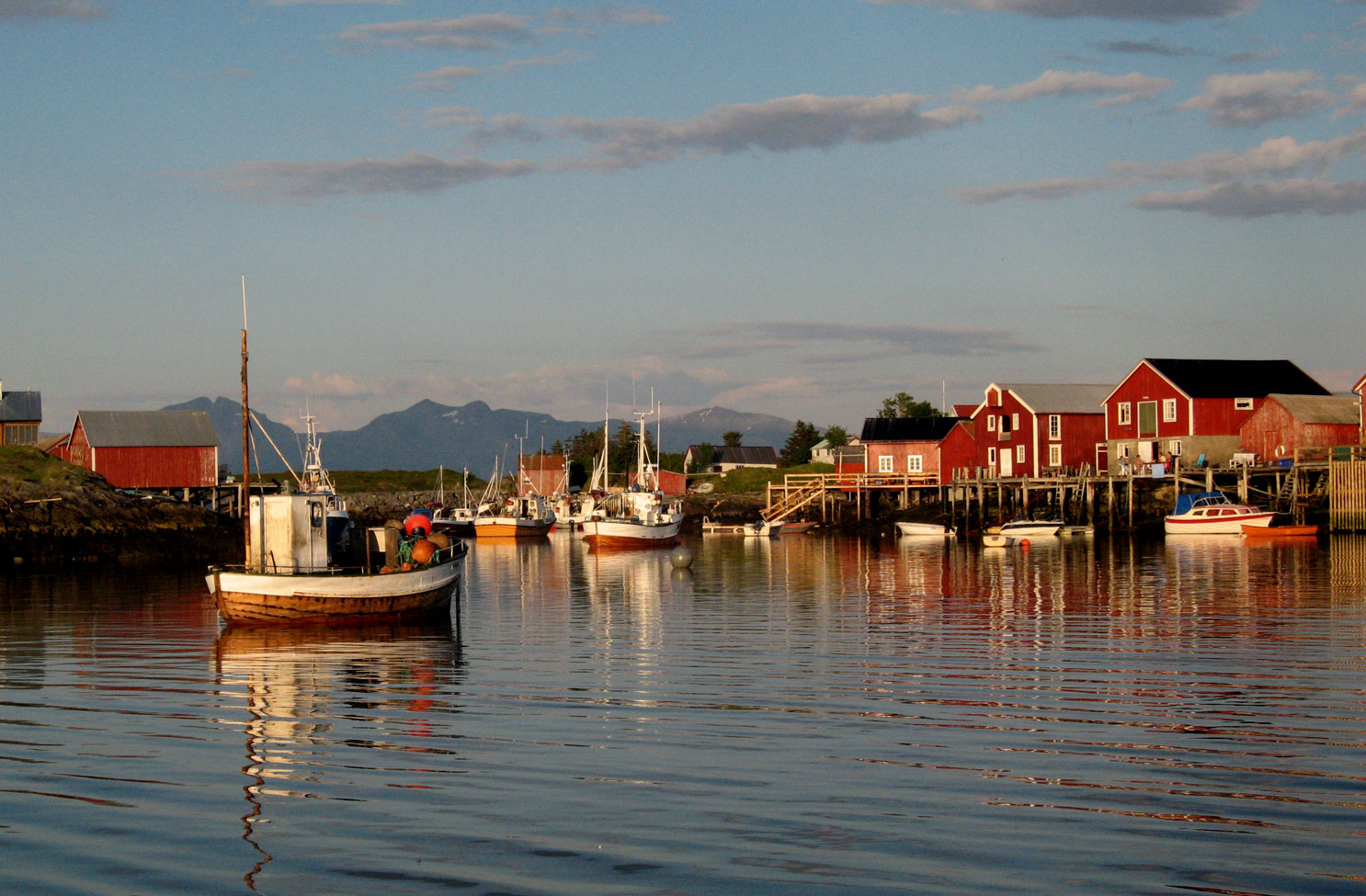
- View of Nes harbour in Vega

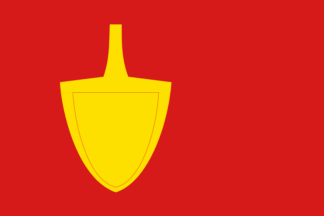
- Flag Coat of arms

- Nordland within Norway

- Vega within Nordland
- Coordinates: 65°40′31″N 11°57′28″E
- Country: Norway
- County: Nordland
- District: Helgeland
- Established: 1 Jan 1838
  - Created as: Formannskapsdistrikt
- Administrative centre: Gladstad

Government
  - Mayor (2023): Jon Floa (Sp)

Area
  - Total: 164.79 km^{2} (63.63 sq mi)
  - Land: 162.56 km^{2} (62.76 sq mi)
  - Water: 2.23 km^{2} (0.86 sq mi) 1.4%
  - Rank: #315 in Norway
- Highest elevation: 800.56 m (2,626.5 ft)

Population (2024)
  - Total: 1,208
  - Rank: #321 in Norway
  - Density: 7.3/km^{2} (19/sq mi)
  - Change (10 years): ▼ −1.2%
- Demonym: Vegværing

Official language
  - Norwegian form: Bokmål
- Time zone: UTC+01:00 (CET)
  - Summer (DST): UTC+02:00 (CEST)
- ISO 3166 code: NO-1815
- Website: Official website

UNESCO World Heritage Site
- Official name: Vegaøyan; The Vega Archipelago
- Criteria: Cultural: v
- Reference: 1143
- Inscription: 2004 (28th Session)
- Area: 107,294 hectares (414 mi^{2})
- Buffer zone: 28,952 hectares (112 mi^{2})

Vega is a municipality in Nordland county, Norway. It is part of the Helgeland traditional region. The administrative centre of the municipality is the village of Gladstad. Other villages include Holand and Ylvingen.

The municipality comprises about 6,500 islands in the Vega Archipelago. The main island of the municipality is the island of Vega, and it is also the largest at 163 square kilometres (63 sq mi). Bremstein Lighthouse is located in the southwestern part of the municipality.

The 165-square-kilometre (64 sq mi) municipality is the 315th largest by area out of the 357 municipalities in Norway. Vega Municipality is the 321st most populous municipality in Norway with a population of 1,208. The municipality's population density is 7.3 inhabitants per square kilometre (19/sq mi) and its population has decreased by 1.2% over the previous 10-year period.

== General information ==
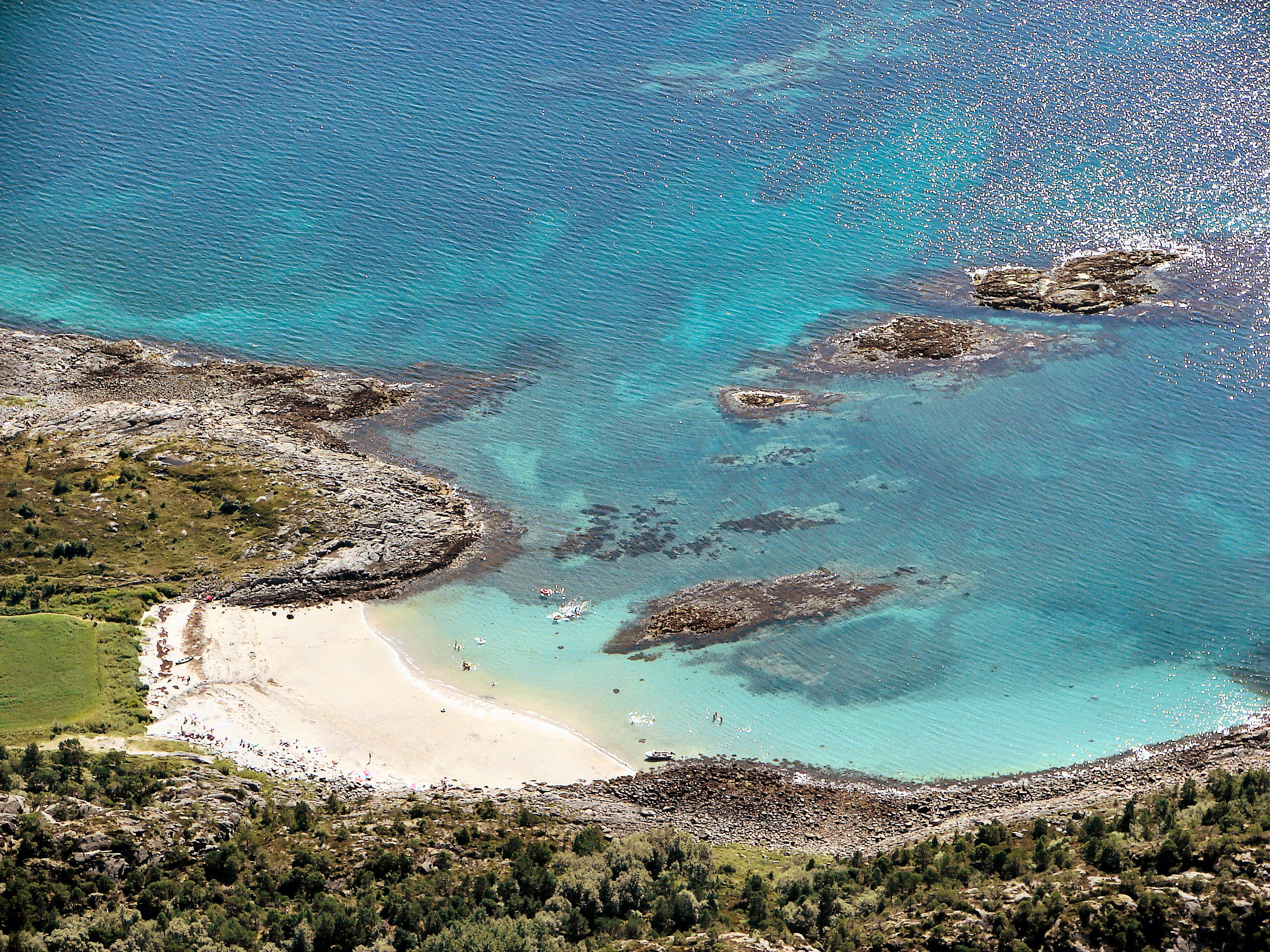
View of the Eidem beach on Vega

The municipality of Vega was established on 1 January 1838 (see formannskapsdistrikt law). On 1 January 1965, the Skogsholmen area (population: 196) was transferred from Tjøtta Municipality to Vega Municipality. Then on 1 January 1971, the Skålvær islands (population: 32) in the northeastern part of Vega Municipality was transferred to the neighboring Alstahaug Municipality.

=== Name ===
The municipality (originally the parish) is named after the main island of Vega (Old Norse: Veiga) since the first Vega Church was built there. The first element is veig which means "liquid" or "fluid" (referring to the lakes and the marshes of the island). The name was written "Vegø" prior to 1891.

=== Coat of arms ===
The coat of arms was granted on 20 November 1987. The official blazon is "Gules, a scoop Or" (Norwegian: I rødt en gull øsekar). This means the arms have a red field (background) and the charge is a bailer for a boat. The bailer or scoop has a tincture of Or which means it is commonly colored yellow, but if it is made out of metal, then gold is used. A bailer is an essential tool that is important to the municipality due to its dependence on the sea. The arms were designed by Tore Engen. An earlier plan for the Vega coat of arms pictured the black silhouette of a sailing boat on a yellow background, but this design was chosen as the coat of arms for Nordland county.

=== Churches ===
The Church of Norway has one parish (sokn) within Vega Municipality. It is part of the Sør-Helgeland prosti (deanery) in the Diocese of Sør-Hålogaland.

Churches in Vega Municipality
Parish (sokn)	Church name	Location of the church	Year built
Vega	Vega Church	Gladstad	1864
Vega	Ylvingen Chapel	Ylvingen	1967

== History ==
Early settlements on the main island date back 10,000 years, making it one of the oldest places of inhabitance in Northern Norway. Agriculture and fishing are at present as they were in the past, key fields of labour. Today's inhabitants are concentrated in Holand, Valla, Igerøy, Ylvingen, and Gladstad, the latter being the location of the municipal council and most of the island's commerce.

== Geography ==
In 2004, the archipelago's cultural landscape was inscribed by UNESCO on the World Heritage Site list as representative of "the way generations of fishermen/farmers have, over the past 1,500 years, maintained a sustainable living in an inhospitable seascape near the Arctic Circle, based on the now unique practice of eider down harvesting." The oceanic climate and limestone bedrock has allowed 10 different species of orchids to grow in Vega, and 210 species of birds have been recorded at the archipelago.

The highest point in the municipality is the 800.56-metre (2,626.5 ft) tall mountain Trolltinden on the southwestern coast of the island of Vega.

Eidemsliene nature reserve has many warmth-loving species of plants and the most oceanic pine forest in North Norway. Holandsosen nature reserve is an important wetland area with a shallow lake and soil rich in lime; 149 species of birds have been observed in this reserve which has a rich bird life all year (many birds use this as their winter quarter). Lånan nature reserve preserves many types of coastal nature and is a very important area for many species of birds; eider down harvesting is still practiced here.

== Climate ==
Vega has a temperate oceanic climate, also known as marine west coast climate (Köppen climate classification: Cfb). The all-time high of 31.7 °C (89.1 °F) was recorded July 27, 2019, and the all-time low −16.5 °C (2.3 °F) was recorded February 2010 (extremes database from 2003). The average date for the last overnight freeze (low below 0 °C (32.0 °F)) in spring is 29 April and average date for first freeze in autumn is 17 October giving a frost-free season of 170 days (1981-2010 average).

Climate data for Vega - Vallsjø 1991-2020 (4 m)
Month	Jan	Feb	Mar	Apr	May	Jun	Jul	Aug	Sep	Oct	Nov	Dec	Year
Mean daily maximum °C (°F)	3 (37)	2.6 (36.7)	3.7 (38.7)	6.9 (44.4)	10.6 (51.1)	13.4 (56.1)	16.2 (61.2)	16.3 (61.3)	13.4 (56.1)	8.9 (48.0)	5.6 (42.1)	3.9 (39.0)	8.7 (47.6)
Daily mean °C (°F)	0.8 (33.4)	0.1 (32.2)	1 (34)	4 (39)	7.5 (45.5)	10.6 (51.1)	13.2 (55.8)	13.2 (55.8)	10.5 (50.9)	6.4 (43.5)	3.3 (37.9)	1.7 (35.1)	6.0 (42.8)
Mean daily minimum °C (°F)	−1.9 (28.6)	−2.4 (27.7)	−1.5 (29.3)	1.5 (34.7)	4.9 (40.8)	8.4 (47.1)	10.8 (51.4)	10.7 (51.3)	8.1 (46.6)	4 (39)	0.9 (33.6)	−0.9 (30.4)	3.6 (38.4)
Average precipitation mm (inches)	127 (5.0)	115 (4.5)	117 (4.6)	84 (3.3)	62 (2.4)	64 (2.5)	67 (2.6)	85 (3.3)	126 (5.0)	126 (5.0)	125 (4.9)	143 (5.6)	1,241 (48.7)
Source 1: Norwegian Meteorological Institute
Source 2: Noaa WMO averages 91-2020 Norway

== Government ==
Vega Municipality is responsible for primary education (through 10th grade), outpatient health services, senior citizen services, welfare and other social services, zoning, economic development, and municipal roads and utilities. The municipality is governed by a municipal council of directly elected representatives. The mayor is indirectly elected by a vote of the municipal council. The municipality is under the jurisdiction of the Helgeland District Court and the Hålogaland Court of Appeal.

=== Municipal council ===
The municipal council (Kommunestyre) of Vega Municipality is made up of 15 representatives that are elected to four year terms. The tables below show the current and historical composition of the council by political party.

Vega kommunestyre 2023–2027
Party name (in Norwegian)	Number of representatives
Labour Party (Arbeiderpartiet)	5
Industry and Business Party (Industri‑ og Næringspartiet)	4
Red Party (Rødt)	2
Centre Party (Senterpartiet)	4
Total number of members:	15

Vega kommunestyre 2019–2023
Party name (in Norwegian)	Number of representatives
Labour Party (Arbeiderpartiet)	9
Red Party (Rødt)	1
Centre Party (Senterpartiet)	5
Total number of members:	15

Vega kommunestyre 2015–2019
Party name (in Norwegian)	Number of representatives
Labour Party (Arbeiderpartiet)	8
Coastal Party (Kystpartiet)	1
Centre Party (Senterpartiet)	5
Socialist Left Party (Sosialistisk Venstreparti)	1
Total number of members:	15

Vega kommunestyre 2011–2015
Party name (in Norwegian)	Number of representatives
Labour Party (Arbeiderpartiet)	8
Progress Party (Fremskrittspartiet)	1
Conservative Party (Høyre)	1
Coastal Party (Kystpartiet)	1
Centre Party (Senterpartiet)	3
Socialist Left Party (Sosialistisk Venstreparti)	1
Total number of members:	15

Vega kommunestyre 2007–2011
Party name (in Norwegian)	Number of representatives
Labour Party (Arbeiderpartiet)	8
Progress Party (Fremskrittspartiet)	1
Conservative Party (Høyre)	1
Centre Party (Senterpartiet)	4
Socialist Left Party (Sosialistisk Venstreparti)	1
Total number of members:	15

Vega kommunestyre 2003–2007
Party name (in Norwegian)	Number of representatives
Labour Party (Arbeiderpartiet)	5
Progress Party (Fremskrittspartiet)	2
Conservative Party (Høyre)	1
Centre Party (Senterpartiet)	5
Socialist Left Party (Sosialistisk Venstreparti)	2
Total number of members:	15

Vega kommunestyre 1999–2003
Party name (in Norwegian)	Number of representatives
Labour Party (Arbeiderpartiet)	6
Conservative Party (Høyre)	3
Centre Party (Senterpartiet)	7
Socialist Left Party (Sosialistisk Venstreparti)	2
Liberal Party (Venstre)	1
Total number of members:	19

Vega kommunestyre 1995–1999
Party name (in Norwegian)	Number of representatives
Labour Party (Arbeiderpartiet)	7
Conservative Party (Høyre)	1
Centre Party (Senterpartiet)	7
Socialist Left Party (Sosialistisk Venstreparti)	2
Liberal Party (Venstre)	2
Total number of members:	19

Vega kommunestyre 1991–1995
Party name (in Norwegian)	Number of representatives
Labour Party (Arbeiderpartiet)	7
Conservative Party (Høyre)	2
Centre Party (Senterpartiet)	5
Socialist Left Party (Sosialistisk Venstreparti)	3
Liberal Party (Venstre)	1
Vega Social Democrat list (Vega sosialdemokratiske liste)	1
Total number of members:	19

Vega kommunestyre 1987–1991
Party name (in Norwegian)	Number of representatives
Labour Party (Arbeiderpartiet)	7
Conservative Party (Høyre)	2
Centre Party (Senterpartiet)	3
Socialist Left Party (Sosialistisk Venstreparti)	2
Liberal Party (Venstre)	1
Vega Social Democrat List (Vega sosialdemokratiske liste)	4
Total number of members:	19

Vega kommunestyre 1983–1987
Party name (in Norwegian)	Number of representatives
Labour Party (Arbeiderpartiet)	8
Conservative Party (Høyre)	1
Christian Democratic Party (Kristelig Folkeparti)	1
Centre Party (Senterpartiet)	3
Socialist Left Party (Sosialistisk Venstreparti)	2
Liberal Party (Venstre)	1
Vega Social Democrat list (Vega Sosialdemokratiske liste)	3
Total number of members:	19

Vega kommunestyre 1979–1983
Party name (in Norwegian)	Number of representatives
Labour Party (Arbeiderpartiet)	8
Conservative Party (Høyre)	3
Christian Democratic Party (Kristelig Folkeparti)	1
Socialist Left Party (Sosialistisk Venstreparti)	1
Joint list of the Centre Party (Senterpartiet) and the Liberal Party (Venstre)	6
Total number of members:	19

Vega kommunestyre 1975–1979
Party name (in Norwegian)	Number of representatives
Labour Party (Arbeiderpartiet)	9
Christian Democratic Party (Kristelig Folkeparti)	1
Centre Party (Senterpartiet)	6
Socialist Left Party (Sosialistisk Venstreparti)	2
Liberal Party (Venstre)	1
Total number of members:	19

Vega kommunestyre 1971–1975
Party name (in Norwegian)	Number of representatives
Labour Party (Arbeiderpartiet)	10
Centre Party (Senterpartiet)	5
Liberal Party (Venstre)	2
Local List(s) (Lokale lister)	2
Total number of members:	19

Vega kommunestyre 1967–1971
Party name (in Norwegian)	Number of representatives
Labour Party (Arbeiderpartiet)	9
Centre Party (Senterpartiet)	4
Liberal Party (Venstre)	4
Local List(s) (Lokale lister)	2
Total number of members:	19

Vega kommunestyre 1963–1967
Party name (in Norwegian)	Number of representatives
Labour Party (Arbeiderpartiet)	7
Centre Party (Senterpartiet)	3
Liberal Party (Venstre)	3
List of workers, fishermen, and small farmholders (Arbeidere, fiskere, småbrukere liste)	4
Total number of members:	17

Vega herredsstyre 1959–1963
Party name (in Norwegian)	Number of representatives
Labour Party (Arbeiderpartiet)	11
Centre Party (Senterpartiet)	3
Liberal Party (Venstre)	3
Total number of members:	17

Vega herredsstyre 1955–1959
Party name (in Norwegian)	Number of representatives
Labour Party (Arbeiderpartiet)	11
Farmers' Party (Bondepartiet)	3
Liberal Party (Venstre)	3
Total number of members:	17

Vega herredsstyre 1951–1955
Party name (in Norwegian)	Number of representatives
Labour Party (Arbeiderpartiet)	10
Christian Democratic Party (Kristelig Folkeparti)	1
Farmers' Party (Bondepartiet)	2
Liberal Party (Venstre)	3
Total number of members:	16

Vega herredsstyre 1947–1951
Party name (in Norwegian)	Number of representatives
Labour Party (Arbeiderpartiet)	9
Farmers' Party (Bondepartiet)	1
Liberal Party (Venstre)	4
List of workers, fishermen, and small farmholders (Arbeidere, fiskere, småbrukere liste)	2
Total number of members:	16

Vega herredsstyre 1945–1947
Party name (in Norwegian)	Number of representatives
Labour Party (Arbeiderpartiet)	11
Liberal Party (Venstre)	3
Local List(s) (Lokale lister)	2
Total number of members:	16

Vega herredsstyre 1937–1941*
Party name (in Norwegian)	Number of representatives
Labour Party (Arbeiderpartiet)	9
Farmers' Party (Bondepartiet)	2
Liberal Party (Venstre)	5
Total number of members:	16
Note: Due to the German occupation of Norway during World War II, no elections were held for new municipal councils until after the war ended in 1945.

=== Mayors ===
The mayor (Norwegian: ordfører) of Vega Municipality is the political leader of the municipality and the chairperson of the municipal council. Here is a list of people who have held this position:

- 1838–1842: Petter Andreas Borgen
- 1843–1844: Rev. Johan Fredrich Voss
- 1844–1846: Lars Nielsen Hestvik
- 1847–1853: Rev. P.C.B. Lund
- 1854–1856: P. Tønder
- 1857–1858: Rev. Anton B. Frost
- 1859–1860: P. Tønder
- 1861–1864: Rev. Isach Wilhelm Castberg Fleicher
- 1865–1868: Ulrik Ulriksen
- 1869–1870: Christoffer Evensen
- 1871–1886: Nicolai Hansen Kjælkdalen
- 1887–1904: Andreas Andersen Grimsø (V)
- 1905–1928: Peter Nicolaisen (V)
- 1929–1931: Oskar O. Floa (Ap)
- 1932–1937: Emil Wahl (V)
- 1938–1941: Oskar O. Floa (Ap)
- 1941–1942: Emil Wahl (V)
- 1943–1945: Jan Robertsen (NS)
- 1945–1945: Oskar O. Floa (Ap)
- 1946–1967: Haakon Olsen Wika (Ap)
- 1968–1974: Olav D. Gullsvåg (Ap)
- 1975–1979: Osvald Floa (Ap)
- 1980–1981: Egil Mortensen (Sp)
- 1982–1983: Gunnar Sundsvold (Sp)
- 1984–1995: Osvald Floa (Ap)
- 1995–2007: Einar Silseth (Sp)
- 2007–2023: Andre Møller (Ap)
- 2023–present: Jon Floa (Sp)

== Notable people ==
- Haakon Olsen Wika (1899 in Vega – 1981), a Norwegian politician who was Mayor of Vega for many years

== Media gallery ==
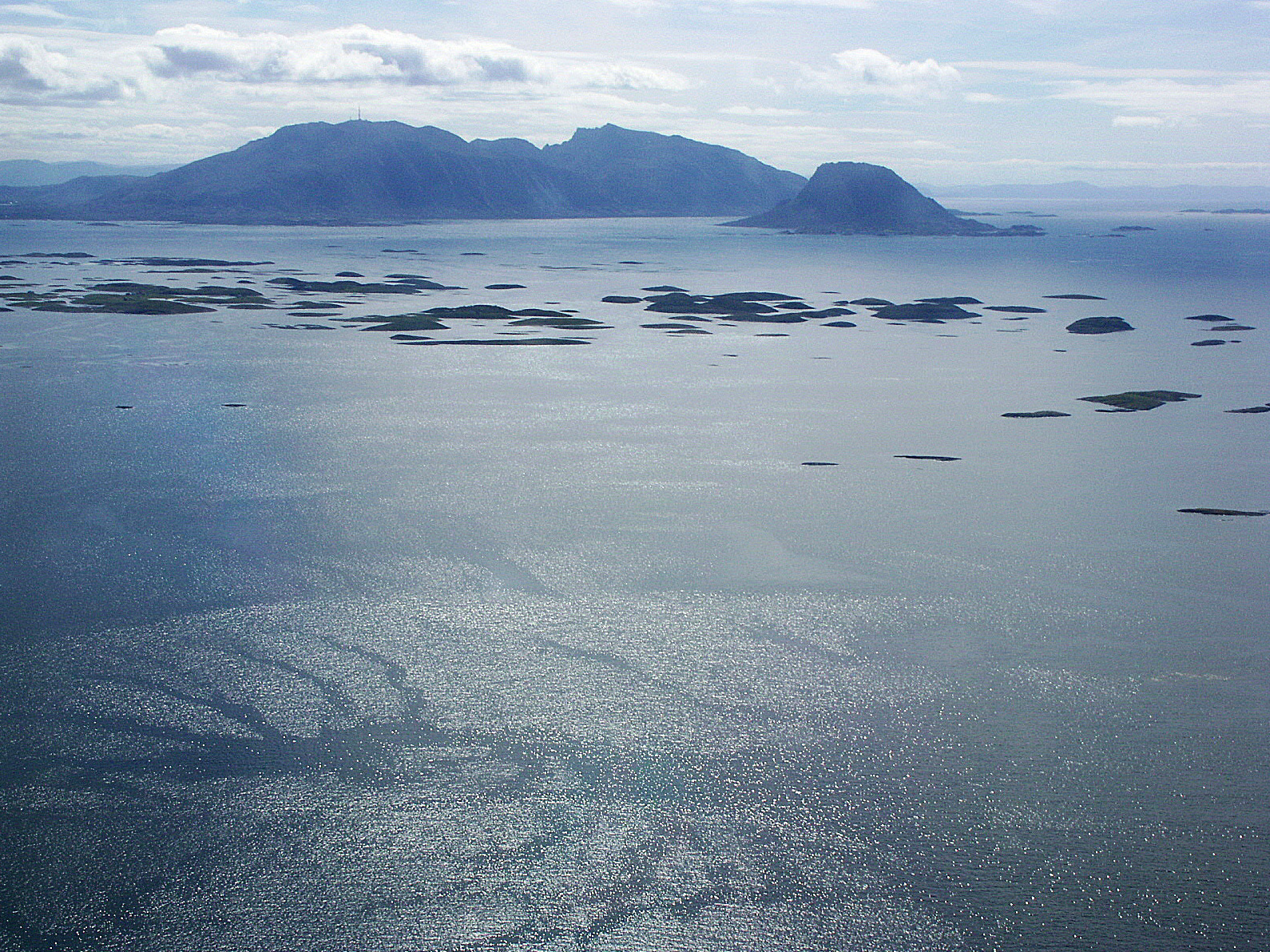
The Vega islands

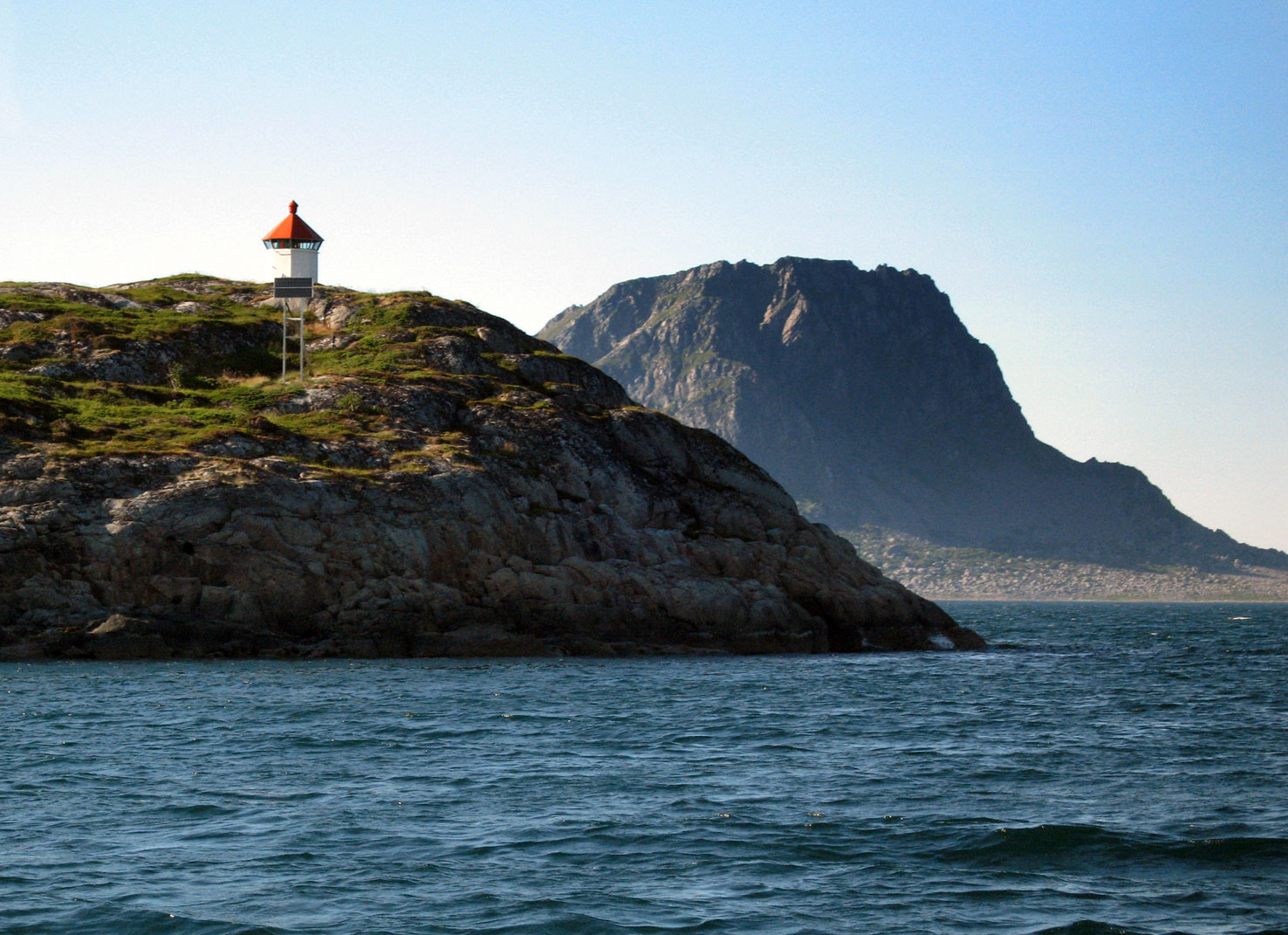
Søla island

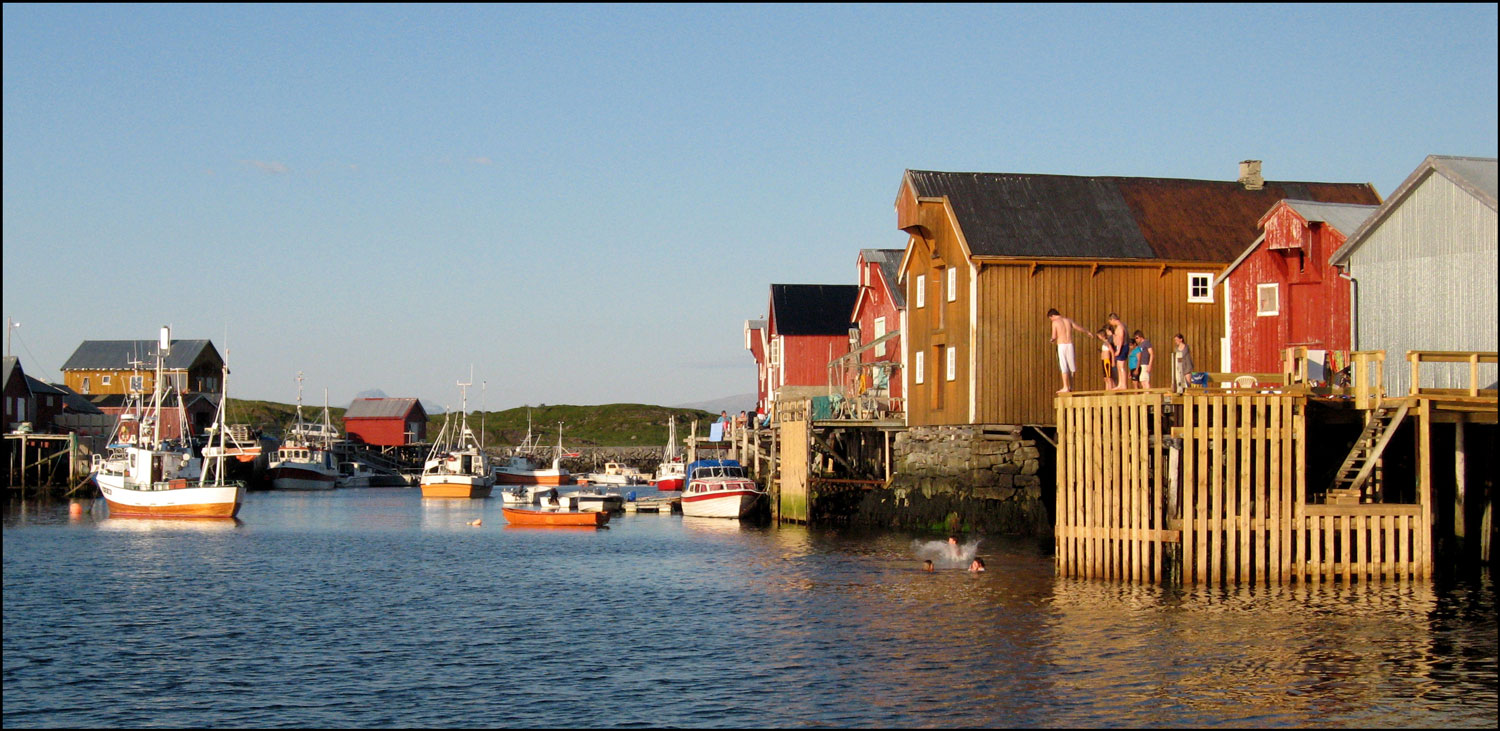
A summer day
