= Vega (island in Norway) =

Island in Nordland, Norway

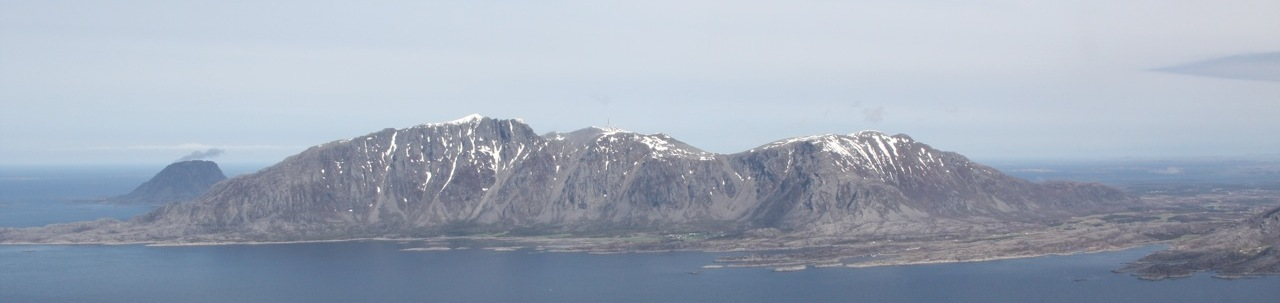
- View of the island
- Interactive map of Vega

Geography
- Location: Nordland, Norway
- Coordinates: 65.6690°N 11.8569°E
- Archipelago: Vegaøyan
- Area: 108 km^{2} (42 sq mi)
- Length: 14.5 km (9.01 mi)
- Width: 10 km (6 mi)
- Highest elevation: 801 m (2628 ft)
- Highest point: Trollvasstinden

Administration
- Norway
- County: Nordland
- Municipality: Vega Municipality

Vega is an island in Vega Municipality in Nordland county, Norway. The 108-square-kilometre (42 sq mi) island is the largest island in the 6,500 islands in the Vegaøyan archipelago, all of which is a UNESCO World Heritage Site. The island lies in the Norwegian Sea, about 18 kilometres (11 mi) west of the mainland of Norway. The islands of Igerøya and Ylvingen lie between Vega and the mainland. The main villages on the island are Gladstad, the administrative centre of the municipality, and Holand.

The southwestern part of the island is mountainous, with the highest point being the 803-metre (2,635 ft) tall Trollvasstinden. The rest of the island is rather flat and marshy.

The island is only accessible by boat. There is a regular ferry route from the island to the island of Ylvingen and to the mainland. The island of Vega is connected to the neighboring island of Igerøya by a short bridge. There is also a ferry from Igerøya to the village of Tjøtta which is just south of the town of Sandnessjøen.

== Media gallery ==
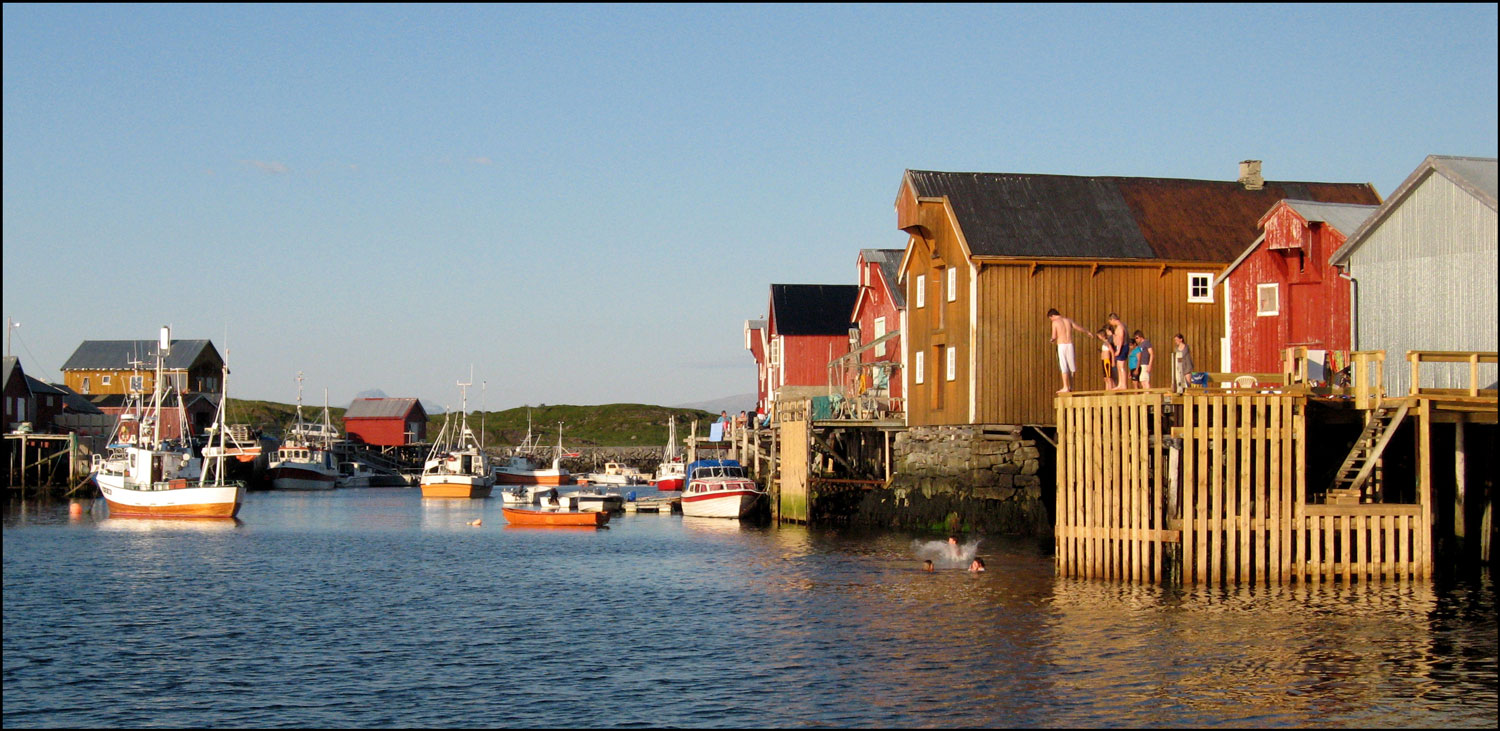

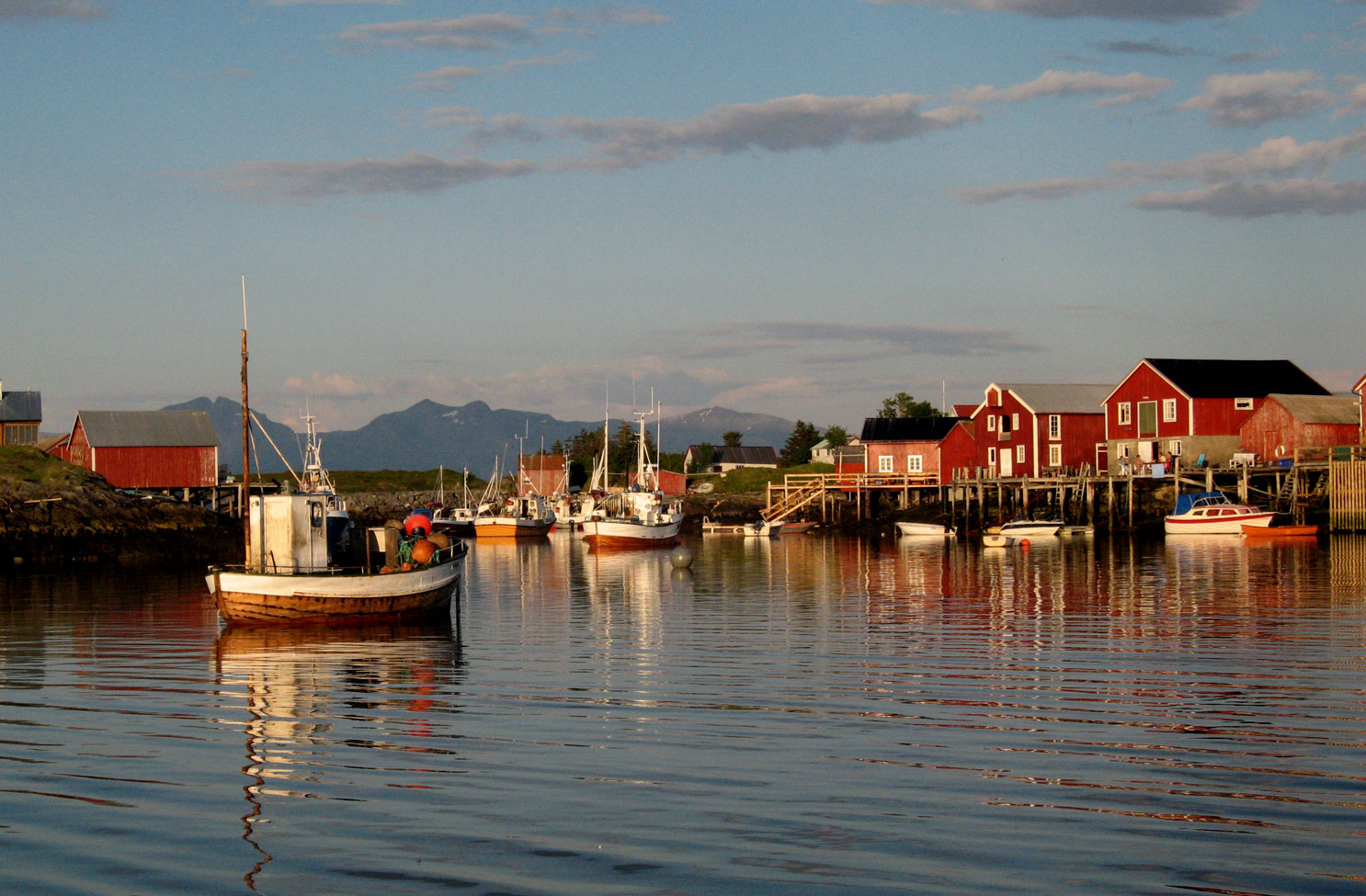

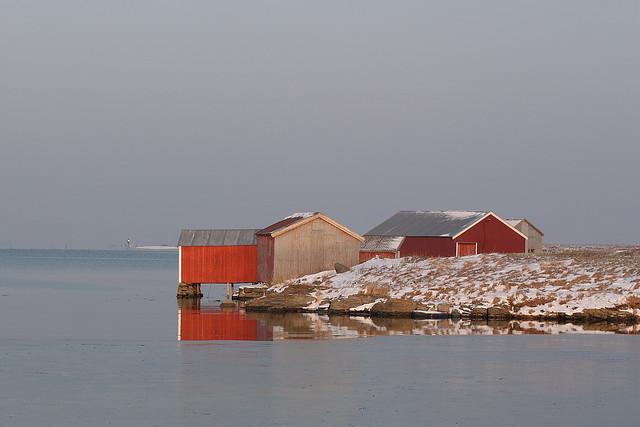

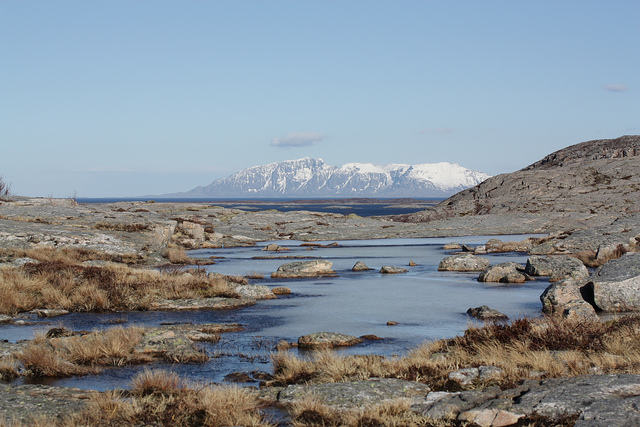

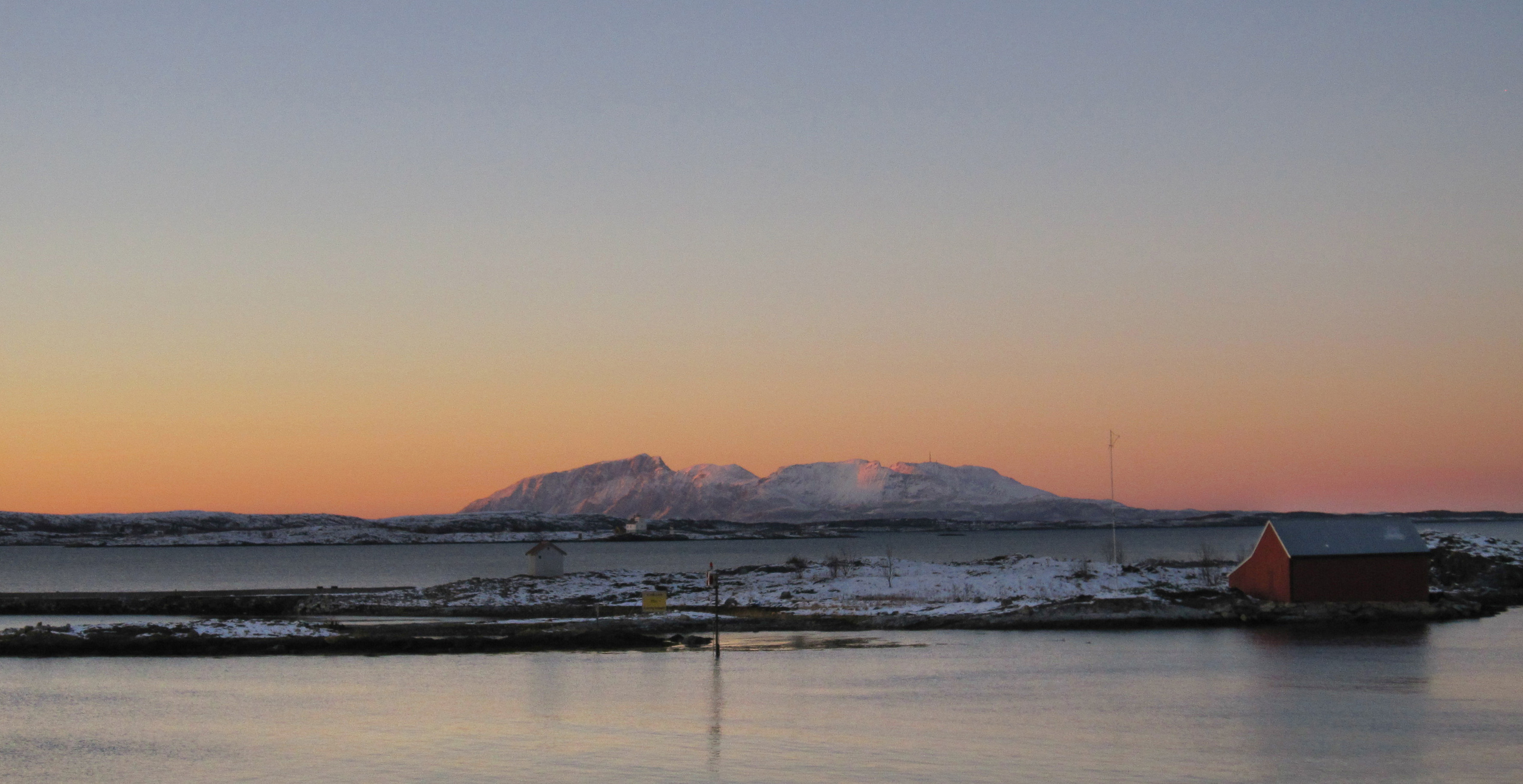

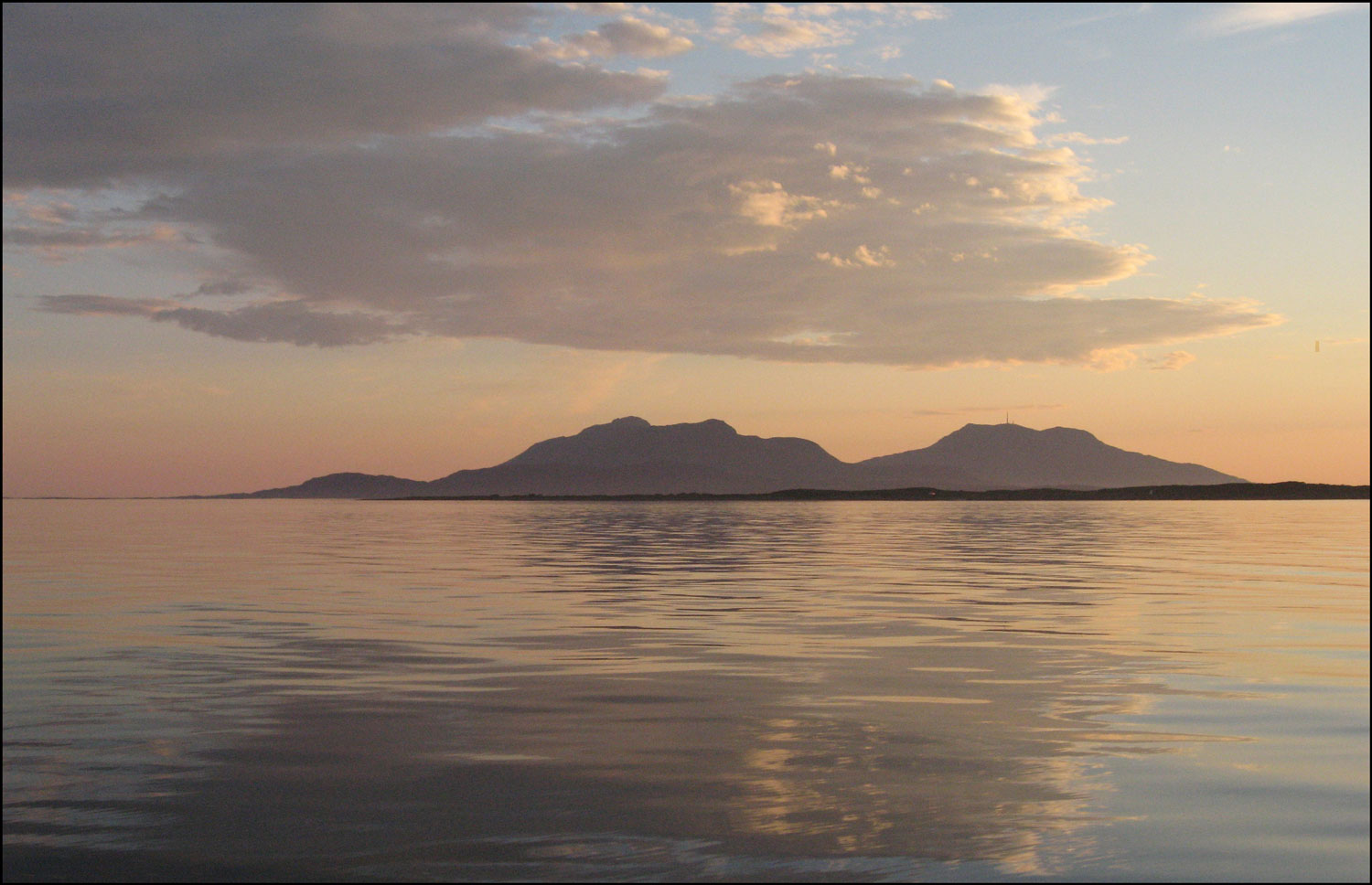

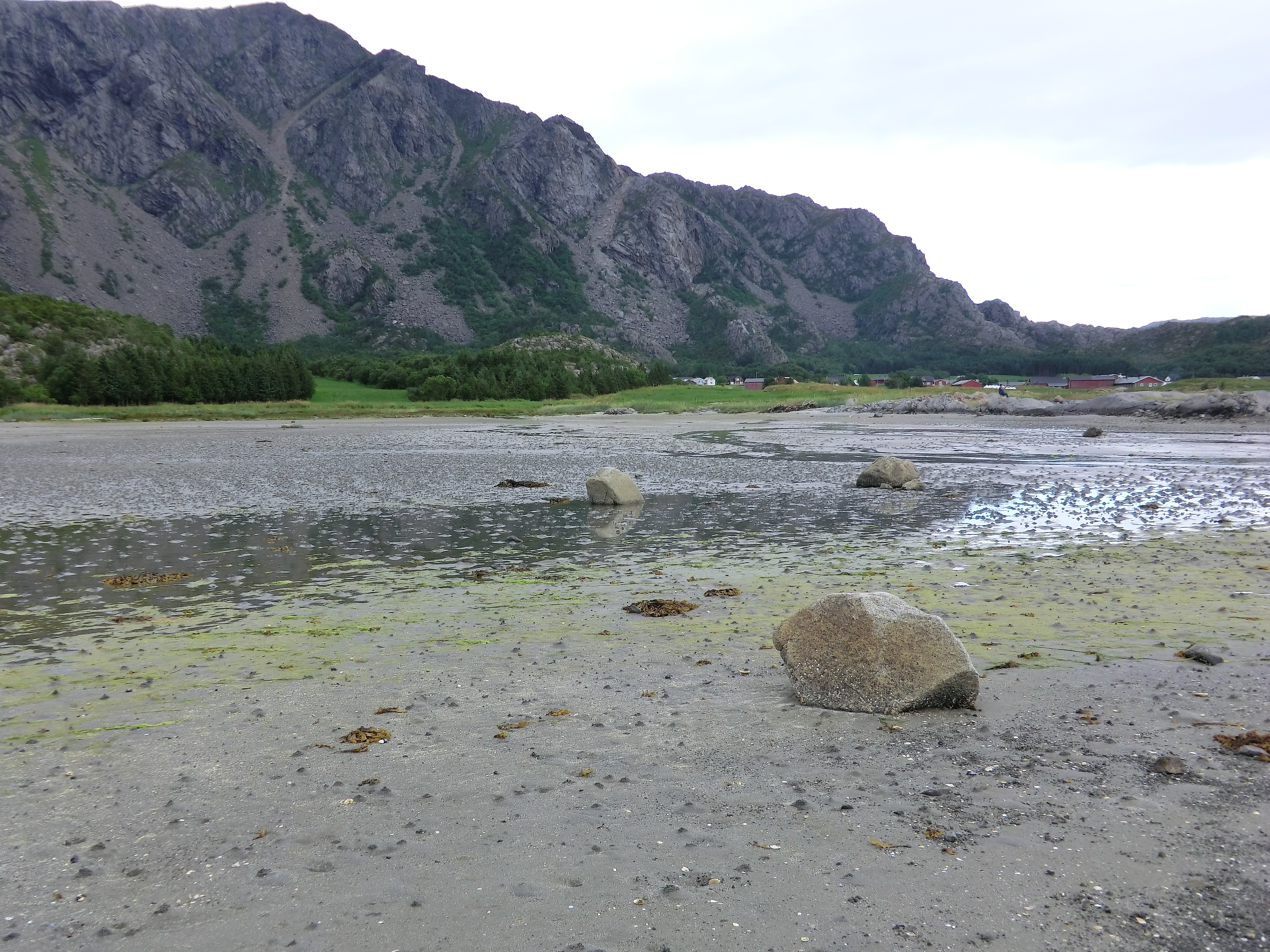

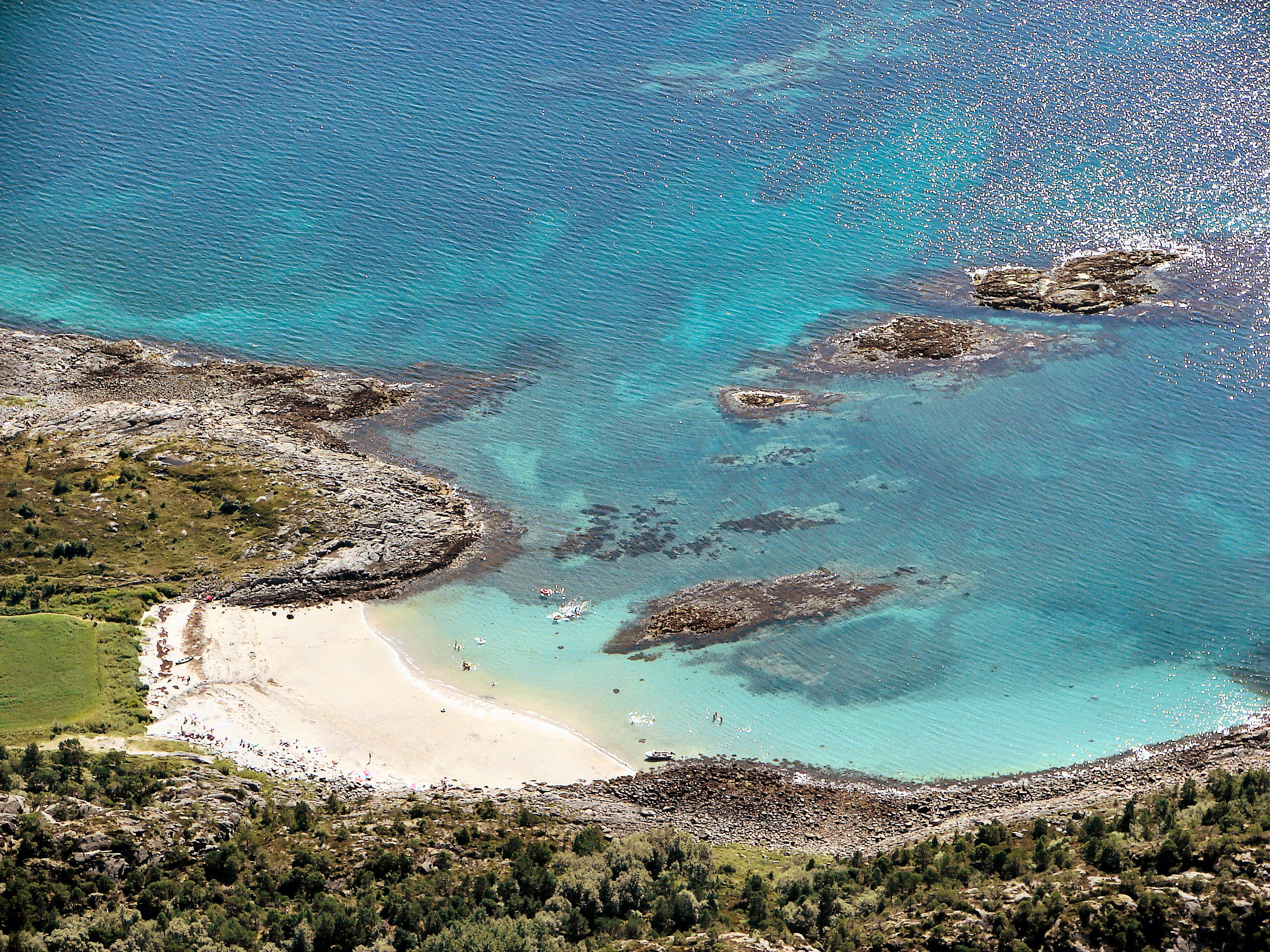

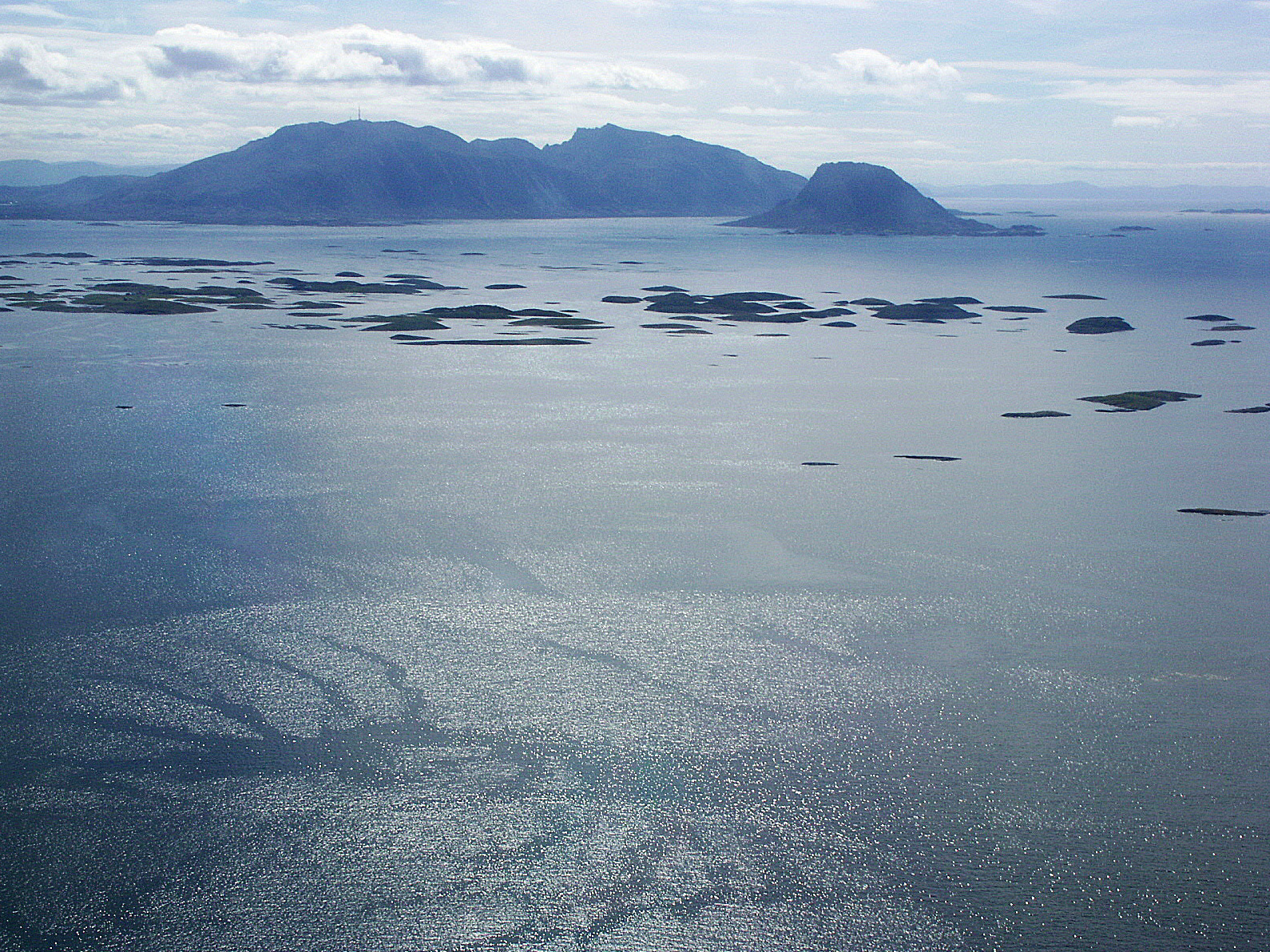

== See also ==
- List of islands of Norway
