= Vegaøyan =

Island in Nordland, Norway

Vega Archipelago Vegaøyan
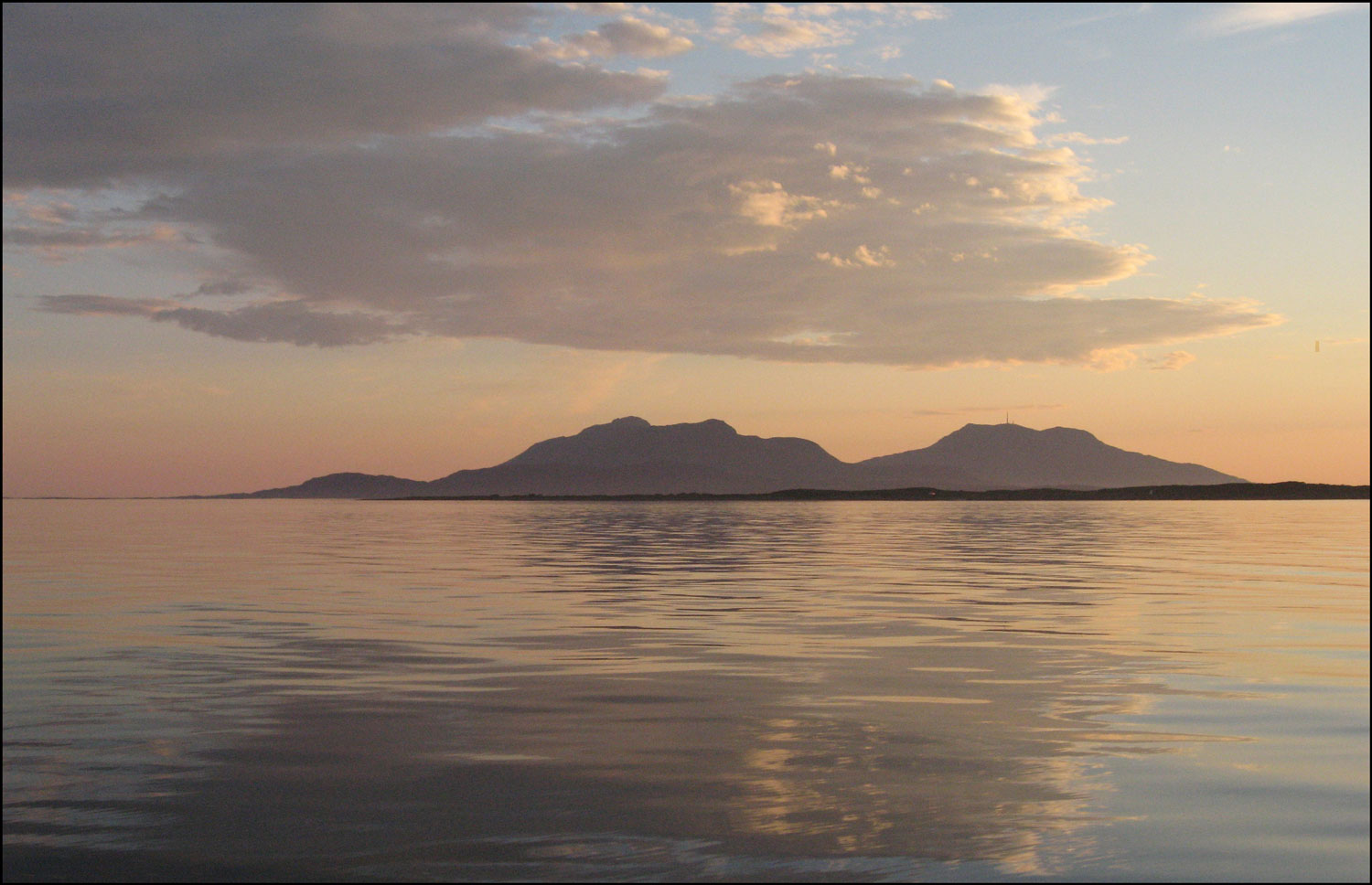
- Interactive map of Vega Archipelago; Vegaøyan

Geography
- Location: Nordland, Norway
- Coordinates: 65°42′25″N 11°50′46″E

Administration
- Norway
- County: Nordland
- Municipality: Vega Municipality

UNESCO World Heritage Site
- Official name: Vegaøyan – The Vega Archipelago
- Location: Nordland, Norway
- Criteria: Cultural: (v)
- Reference: 1143bis
- Inscription: 2004 (28th Session)
- Extensions: 2017
- Area: 107,294 ha (265,130 acres)
- Buffer zone: 28,952 ha (71,540 acres)

Vegaøyan (Norwegian) or the Vega Archipelago (English) is a group of islands in the Norwegian Sea in Nordland county, Norway. The archipelago is mostly located in Vega Municipality. Since 2004, the archipelago has been a UNESCO World Heritage Site. This cluster of around 6,500 small islands just south of the Arctic Circle, surrounds the main island of Vega and has been inhabited since the Stone Age. Other larger islands in the group include Igerøya, Ylvingen, and Søla.

== Description ==
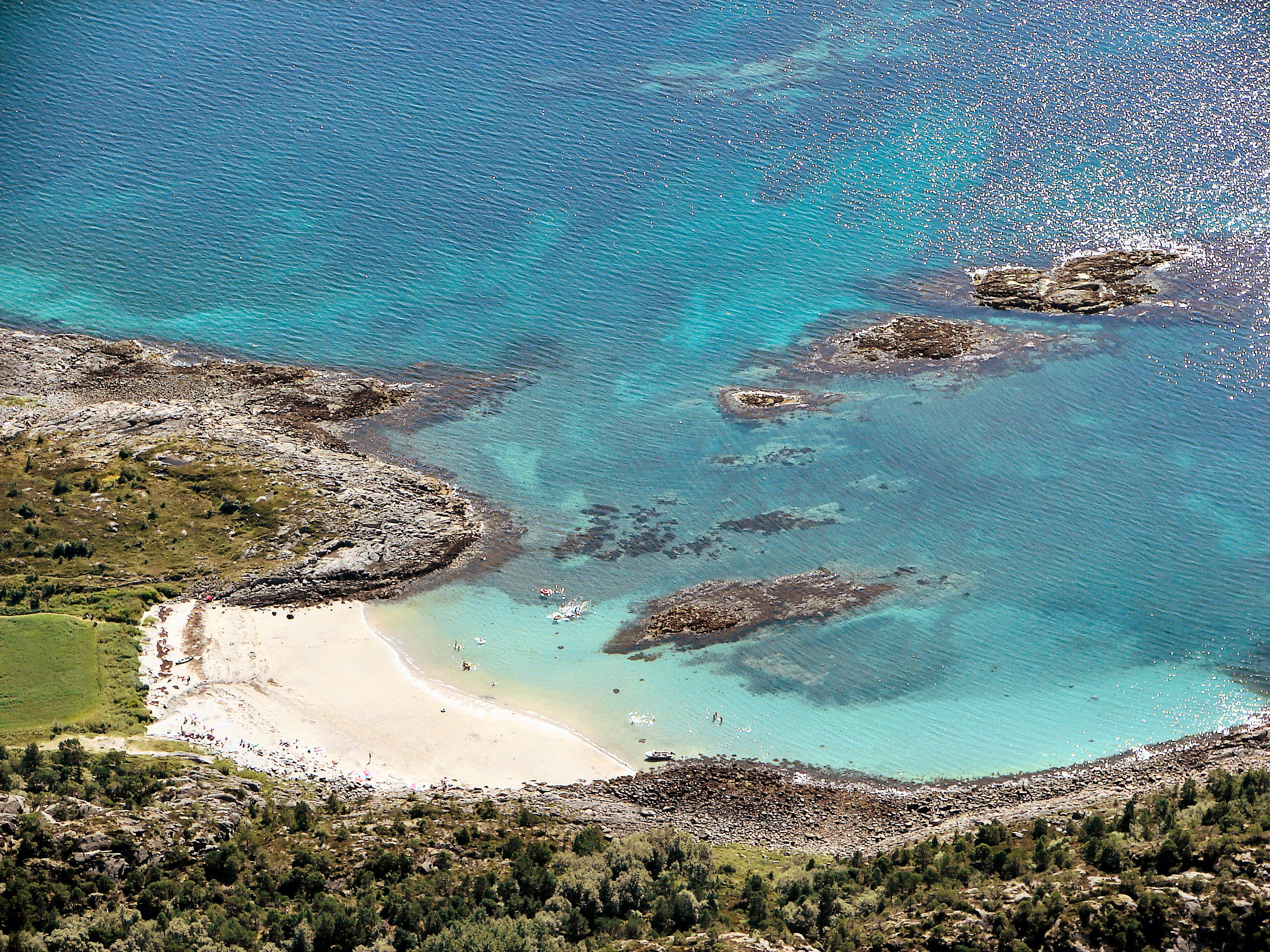
Eidem beach on Vega

The islands bear testimony to a distinctive frugal way of life based on fishing and the harvesting of the down of eider ducks, in an inhospitable environment. There are fishing villages, quays, eider houses (built for eider ducks to nest), farmland, and lighthouses. There is evidence of human settlement from the Stone Age onwards. By the 9th century, the islands had become an important centre for the supply of down, which appears to have accounted for around a third of the islanders' income.

The Vega archipelago reflects the way generations of fishermen/farmers have, over the past 1500 years, maintained a sustainable living in an inhospitable seascape near the Arctic Circle, based on the now unique practice of eider down harvesting, and it also celebrate the contribution made by women to the eider down process.

Access to the archipelago is by ferry or fast boat from the town of Brønnøysund in Brønnøy Municipality, which can be reached by plane or by road.

=== Important Bird Area ===
The archipelago was identified as an Important Bird Area (IBA) by BirdLife International because it supports populations of greylag and barnacle geese, common eiders, common loons, great cormorants, European shags, white-tailed eagles, purple sandpipers and black guillemots.

== The Place of Tides ==
English farmer and writer James Rebanks spent a season on the Vegaøyan island of Færøy, learning about the traditional practice of caring for wild eider ducks and gathering their down, and described it in his 2025 book The Place of Tides (Penguin, ISBN 9780141991924).
